= Orson Reed =

American politician (1809 – c. 1890)

Member of the Wisconsin Senate from the 10th district
- In office January 1, 1866 – January 6, 1868
- Preceded by: William Blair
- Succeeded by: Curtis Mann

Sheriff of Waukesha County, Wisconsin
- In office January 1, 1863 – January 1, 1865
- Preceded by: James Clark
- Succeeded by: Albert Alden

Member of the Wisconsin State Assembly from the Waukesha 1st district
- In office January 3, 1853 – January 2, 1854
- Preceded by: John U. Hilliard
- Succeeded by: Denison Worthington

Personal details
- Born: September 7, 1809 Littleton, Massachusetts, U.S.
- Died: c.1890
- Party: Democratic
- Spouse: Agnes Fairservice (m. 1839)
- Children: 3
- Relatives: George B. Reed (brother); Harrison Reed (brother); Curtis Reed (brother); Martha Reed Mitchell (sister); Abram D. Smith (brother-in-law); Chloe Merrick Reed (sister-in-law); Alexander Mitchell (brother-in-law); John L. Mitchell (nephew)
- Occupation: Farmer

Orson Reed (September 7, 1809 – c.1890) was an American farmer, Democratic politician, and Wisconsin pioneer. He represented Waukesha County in the Wisconsin Senate (1866, 1867) and State Assembly (1853), and also served as sheriff of Waukesha County. His first name was sometimes spelled "Orison".

Most of Reed's siblings were also notable politicians or married to notable politicians. His brothers were George B. Reed, Harrison Reed, and Curtis Reed. His youngest sister was Martha Reed Mitchell.

== Biography ==
Orson Reed was born September 7, 1809, in Middlesex County, Massachusetts. When he was a child, his family moved to a farm in Westford, Massachusetts, and then to a new farm in Vermont in 1823.

The Reed family began looking west in the 1830s, the first to go west was Orson's eldest brother, George B. Reed, who came to Milwaukee in 1834. Orson came with his parents and siblings in 1835. Two years later, Orson and his younger brother, Curtis Reed, went further west to what is now the village of Summit, Waukesha County, Wisconsin, where they established a claim and started a farm. Their parents followed them to Summit later that year. The first post office was established there in 1838, with Curtis Reed as postmaster.

Reed built the first structure in what is now Okauchee Lake, Wisconsin—he constructed a saw mill there in 1839 and 1840, and operated it until 1847, when he sold his ownership. His mill furnished a large portion of the lumber used in the construction of the Milwaukee & Watertown plank road.

In 1844, new towns were established by legislation in their region, and what is now the northwest quadrant of Waukesha County was established as the town of Oconomowoc. At that time, Reed helped his brother, Curtis, to gather up a large number of men from the areas that are now the towns of Summit, Merton, and Ashippun, to go to the first town meeting and elect Curtis Reed as town chairman.

In 1845, prominent citizens of Waukesha began advocating for separating their region from Milwaukee County. Orson Reed and his brothers identified with the faction opposed to division. The division won however, and Waukesha County was created from what had been the western half of Milwaukee County.

Through local politics, Reed became active with the Democratic Party. In 1852, he ran for Wisconsin State Assembly on the Democratic slate. He was elected to represent Waukesha County's 1st Assembly district, which then comprised the towns of Merton, Delafield, Summit, and Oconomowoc—the northwest corner of the county. During the 1853 legislative session, he served alongside his brother, Curtis Reed, who was representing Winnebago County. Throughout the 1850s, Reed remained active in the state, county, and district level Democratic Party conventions. He was elected to four consecutive terms as chairman of the town of Summit, and was ex officio a member of the Waukesha County Board of Supervisors from 1857 through 1860. He also sought the Democratic nomination for sheriff in 1858, but fell short at the convention. He was ultimately nominated for sheriff in 1862 and prevailed in the general election, serving a two-year term.

In 1865, he received the Democratic nomination for Wisconsin Senate in the 10th Senate district, which then comprised all of Waukesha County. He prevailed in the general election, defeating Republican Vernon Tichenor. During the 1866 and 1867 legislative sessions, Reed served alongside another of his brothers, George B. Reed, who was then the senator from Manitowoc County.

Shortly after his Senate term, Reed left Wisconsin, residing for a time in Florida, where his brother Harrison Reed had been elected governor.

Orson Reed likely died sometime between 1883 and 1895. (Note: After an extensive search, have not been able to find record of his death. According to the obituary of his brother George B. Reed, Orson Reed was still alive in 1883. At the time of his brother Curtis Reed's death in 1895, various obituaries stated that Harrison Reed was the only surviving brother.)

== Personal life and family ==
Orson Reed was the third of eight children born to Seth Harrison Reed and his wife Rhoda (née Finney). The Reed family were descendants of the colonist Philip Reade, who came to the Massachusetts Bay Colony from England in the 1660s. Nearly all of Orson Reed's seven siblings were notable in some way:

- Julia Ann Reed (1806–1881) married physician Thomas J. Noyes who was the president of Milwaukee's first medical society, and the first doctor at Menasha, Wisconsin.
- George B. Reed (1807–1883) was the first village president of Manitowoc, Wisconsin, and served three terms in the Wisconsin Senate, overlapping with Orson Reed's Senate term in 1866 and 1867. He was also a prominent railroad executive, known as the "father of the Wisconsin Central Railroad", which linked Lake Superior to Milwaukee. He died in the Newhall House Hotel Fire.
- Mary Augusta Reed (1811–1866) married attorney Abram D. Smith who became one of the first elected justices of the Wisconsin Supreme Court.
- Harrison Jackson Reed (1813–1899) was one of the original owners of the Milwaukee Sentinel and an early editor of the Wisconsin State Journal, and then became one of the founders of Neenah, Wisconsin. Later he moved to Florida and, during reconstruction, he became the 9th governor of Florida.
- Curtis Reed (1815–1895) was the founder of Menasha, Wisconsin, and served two terms in the Wisconsin State Assembly—one of which was concurrent with Orson Reed's term in the Assembly in 1853.
- Martha Reed (1818–1902) married the prominent Milwaukee banker and congressman Alexander Mitchell and became a philanthropist. Their son John L. Mitchell was a U.S. senator; their grandson, Billy Mitchell, is considered the father of the United States Air Force.
- Herbert Reed (1822–1875) was a railroad depot agent in Iowa County, Wisconsin.

Orson Reed married Agnes Fairservice on March 19, 1839. Agnes Fairservice was also a pioneer settler of Wisconsin with her father Marshall Fairservice. Their wedding was the second wedding held in the town of Summit. They had at least three children together.

== Notes ==
Wisconsin State Assembly
Preceded by John U. Hilliard	Member of the Wisconsin State Assembly from the Waukesha 1st district January 3, 1853 – January 2, 1854	Succeeded by Denison Worthington
Wisconsin Senate
Preceded by William Blair	Member of the Wisconsin Senate from the 10th district January 1, 1866 – January 6, 1868	Succeeded by Curtis Mann
Legal offices
Preceded by James Clark	Sheriff of Waukesha County, Wisconsin; January 1, 1863 – January 1, 1865	Succeeded by Albert Alden
