= George B. Reed =

19th century American politician

George Reed

Member of the Wisconsin Senate from the 19th district
- In office January 2, 1865 – January 2, 1871
- Preceded by: Joseph Vilas
- Succeeded by: Carl Schmidt

County Judge of Manitowoc County, Wisconsin
- In office January 3, 1853 – January 1, 1855
- Preceded by: Ezekiel Ricker
- Succeeded by: George C. Lee

1st Village President of Manitowoc, Wisconsin
- In office May 12, 1851 – April 1852
- Preceded by: Position established
- Succeeded by: James Bennett

Member of the House of Representatives of the Wisconsin Territory for Waukesha County
- In office October 4, 1847 – May 29, 1848 Serving with Leonard Martin
- Preceded by: Joseph Bond & Chauncey G. Heath
- Succeeded by: Position abolished

Personal details
- Born: November 9, 1807 Middlesex County, Massachusetts, U.S.
- Died: January 10, 1883 (aged 75) Milwaukee, Wisconsin, U.S.
- Cause of death: Newhall House Hotel Fire
- Resting place: Forest Home Cemetery, Milwaukee
- Party: Democratic
- Spouse: Juliette Sherwood Bulkley (m. 1836)
- Relatives: Orson Reed (brother); Harrison Reed (brother); Curtis Reed (brother); Martha Reed Mitchell (sister); Abram D. Smith (brother-in-law); Chloe Merrick Reed (sister-in-law); Alexander Mitchell (brother-in-law); John L. Mitchell (nephew)

George B. Reed (November 9, 1807 – January 10, 1883) was an American lawyer, railroad executive, Democratic politician, and Wisconsin pioneer. He served six years in the Wisconsin State Senate, representing Manitowoc County, and also served as county judge and the first village president of Manitowoc, Wisconsin. He was known as the "father of the Wisconsin Central Railroad" which connected Lake Superior to Milwaukee. He was also the co-founder and namesake of Reedsville, Wisconsin, in Manitowoc County.

Most of Reed's siblings were also notable politicians or married to notable politicians. His brothers were Orson Reed, Harrison Reed, and Curtis Reed. His youngest sister was Martha Reed Mitchell.

== Biography ==
Born in Middlesex County, Massachusetts, as a child he moved with his parents to Westford, Massachusetts, and then to a farm in Vermont in 1823. He went on to study at Middlebury College and then studied law in Rutland, Vermont.

He moved to Milwaukee, Michigan Territory, in 1834, possibly from Chicago. He is believed to have been the first attorney to move to the Wisconsin Territory, and was for many years an advisor to Solomon Juneau. He was soon joined by his parents and siblings.

George Reed followed his brothers Orson and Curtis to the area that is now the town of Summit, Waukesha County, Wisconsin, in the late 1830s, and took up a farm there. While living in Summit, he was elected to serve as a delegate to Wisconsin's first constitutional convention in 1846. After the rejection of that constitution, he was elected to represent Waukesha County in the addition sessions of the 5th Wisconsin Territorial Assembly.

He moved to Manitowoc, Wisconsin, in 1850; while in Manitowoc, Reed served as a two-year term as county judge and was elected as the first village president of Manitowoc upon its incorporation as a village.

In 1854, Reed and Jacob Lueps bought a portion of the town of Maple Grove and had it surveyed and platted. These 56 blocks became the village of "Mud Creek", later renamed Reedsville after "Judge Reed" (as he was widely known).

Reed served as a Democratic member of the Wisconsin Senate from 1865 to 1870.

Reed was involved in the railroad business. He died in the Newhall House Hotel fire in Milwaukee in 1883.

== Personal life and family ==
George B. Reed was the second child and eldest son of the eight children born to Seth Harrison Reed and his wife Rhoda (née Finney). The Reed family were descendants of the colonist Philip Reade, who came to the Massachusetts Bay Colony from England in the 1660s. Nearly all of George Reed's seven siblings were notable in some way:

- Julia Ann Reed (1806–1881) married physician Thomas J. Noyes who was the president of Milwaukee's first medical society, and the first doctor at Menasha, Wisconsin.
- Orson Reed (1809–c.1890) was a member of the Wisconsin Senate and Assembly and served as sheriff of Waukesha County.
- Mary Augusta Reed (1811–1866) married attorney Abram D. Smith who became one of the first elected justices of the Wisconsin Supreme Court.
- Harrison Jackson Reed (1813–1899) was one of the original owners of the Milwaukee Sentinel and an early editor of the Wisconsin State Journal, and then became one of the founders of Neenah, Wisconsin. Later he moved to Florida and, during reconstruction, he became the 9th governor of Florida.
- Curtis Reed (1815–1895) was the founder of Menasha, Wisconsin, and served two terms in the Wisconsin State Assembly—one of which was concurrent with Orson Reed's term in the Assembly in 1853.
- Martha Reed (1818–1902) married the prominent Milwaukee banker and congressman Alexander Mitchell and became a philanthropist. Their son John L. Mitchell was a U.S. senator; their grandson, Billy Mitchell, is considered the father of the United States Air Force.
- Herbert Reed (1822–1875) was a railroad depot agent in Iowa County, Wisconsin.

George Reed married Juliette Sherwood Bulkley on August 10, 1836. They had at least four children together.

Wisconsin Senate
Preceded by Joseph Vilas	Member of the Wisconsin Senate from the 19th district January 2, 1865 – January 2, 1871	Succeeded by Carl Schmidt
Political offices
New village government	Village President of Manitowoc, Wisconsin; May 12, 1851 – April 1852	Succeeded by James Bennett
Legal offices
Preceded by Ezekiel Ricker	County Judge of Manitowoc County, Wisconsin; January 3, 1853 – January 1, 1855	Succeeded by George C. Lee
