= John H. Knight (politician) =

American Union Army officer, 1st Mayor of Ashland, Wisconsin

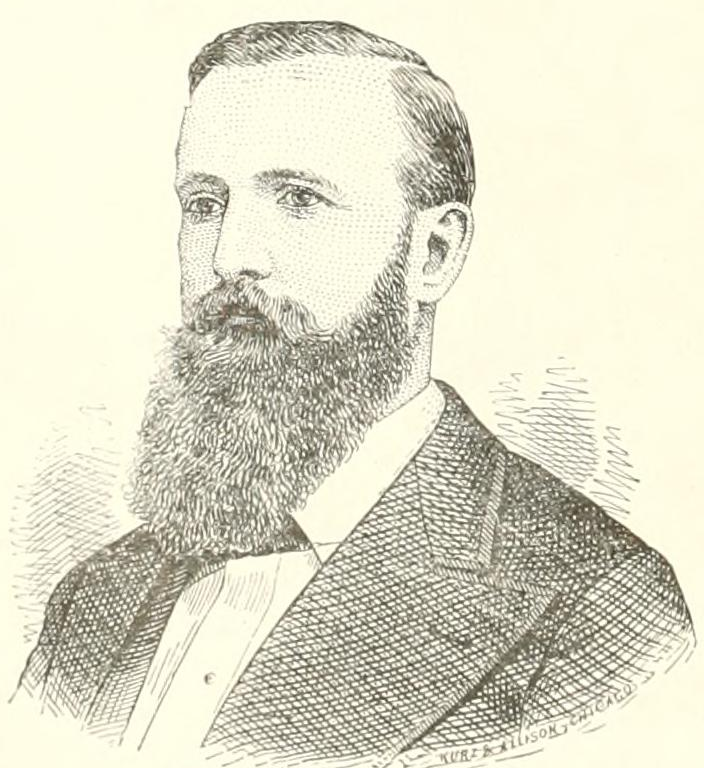

1st Mayor of Ashland, Wisconsin
- In office April 1887 – January 1889
- Preceded by: Position Established

Personal details
- Born: John Henry Knight; February 3, 1836 Kent County, Delaware, US
- Died: August 22, 1903 (aged 67) Watertown, Wisconsin, US
- Resting place: Forest Hill Cemetery; Madison, Wisconsin
- Party: Democratic
- Spouses: Susan James Clark; (m. 1863; died 1867); Ella B. Clark; (m. 1873; died 1912)
- Children: with Susan Clark; Eugenia Bradford (Rowley)^{(b. 1864; died 1950)}; with Ella Clark; Clark Miles Knight^{(b. 1875; died 1933)}; Mary Emlen (Davies)^{(b. 1878; died 1971)}; Anna V. Knight^{(b. 1882; died 1882)}; Rebekah (Cochran)^{(b. 1884; died 1980)}; Pauline Virgilia (Gooding)^{(b. 1889; died 1923)}
- Parents: James Knight (father); Rebecca (Scotten) Knight (mother)
- Education: Albany Law School

Military service
- Allegiance: United States
- Branch/service: United States Army; Union Army
- Years of service: 1861–1870
- Rank: Lt. Colonel
- Unit: 1st Del. Infantry Reg.; 18th Infantry Regiment
- Battles/wars: American Civil War: Manassas campaign; First Battle of Bull Run; Peninsula campaign; Battle of Perryville; Chattanooga campaign; Battle of Lookout Mountain; Battle of Missionary Ridge

John Henry Knight (February 3, 1836 – August 22, 1903) was an American military officer, lawyer, and politician. He was a Union Army officer through the American Civil War. After the war, he was the first Mayor of Ashland, Wisconsin, and was one of the leading developers of the area.

== Early life ==
Knight was born on February 3, 1836, in Kent County, Delaware. He attended Albany Law School, where he studied alongside several other prominent lawyers of his era, including Rufus W. Peckham, Redfield Proctor, and William Freeman Vilas. Knight graduated in 1859 and was admitted to the bar in 1860. He started a law partnership in Dover, Delaware, with George P. Fisher, who had just served as Attorney General of Delaware, but his career was interrupted by the outbreak of the American Civil War.

== Military service ==
At the start of the war, Knight was one of the first young men in Dover to respond to President Abraham Lincoln's call for 75,000 volunteers for three months service. He organized a company of volunteers in Dover and southeastern Pennsylvania, and became first lieutenant of the company. This company became Company H of the 1st Delaware Infantry Regiment. The regiment was assigned to guard duty in Baltimore, but Knight was part of a detachment which joined the federal forces participating in the First Battle of Bull Run. When his three month term expired, he was commissioned a captain and appointed assistant adjutant general of volunteers by President Lincoln.

=== Army of the Cumberland ===
In the spring of 1862, he accepted commission as captain in the regular army and joined the 18th U.S. Infantry Regiment a few days after the conclusion of the Siege of Corinth. The 18th U.S. was attached to the Army of the Cumberland and participated in their retreat from Mississippi and Alabama, through Tennessee and Kentucky, to Louisville, then engaged in maneuvers culminating in the Battle of Perryville. Sometime during these marches, Captain Knight likely contracted Typhoid fever, but continued to lead his company at Perryville. However, during the battle, he was wounded by an explosion and was rendered unable to walk for three months—he never fully recovered from this injury. He took a brief leave and traveled to Wilmington, Delaware, to marry his first wife, Susan Clark. He resumed his duties in March 1863, working as chief mustering officer at Louisville and worked through the summer of 1863 to raise new volunteers.

He returned to his regiment after their defeat at the Battle of Chickamauga, and met them at Chattanooga, Tennessee, where the union forces under William Rosecrans were effectively surrounded. After weeks of starvation, Union reinforcements began to arrive in the vicinity. Three divisions led by Joseph Hooker managed to open a supply line to the stranded army with the Battle of Wauhatchie. The 18th U.S. Regiment was then in support of Hooker at the Battle of Lookout Mountain. The day after the Battle of Missionary Ridge, Knight, whose medical conditions were well known, was ordered to proceed to Detroit for duty as assistant to the provost marshal general of Michigan. During this time, he was also appointed Colonel of the 1st Delaware Cavalry by Governor William Cannon, but was never able to take up this duty.

=== Detroit and post-war years ===
He arrived in Detroit in January 1864 and was assigned superintendent for recruitment and was charged with the reorganization of the veteran regiments of Michigan. He remained at Detroit through the end of the war until February 1867, when he was ordered to return to the 18th U.S. Infantry. He was sent with a battalion of the 18th Infantry to Wyoming and Utah Territory to provide security for railroad construction. In 1868, Colonel Knight took advantage of a new law to begin to transition out of military service. In 1969, President Grant persuaded him to accept a final appointment as Indian agent to the Lake Superior Chippewa in northern Wisconsin.

== Ashland ==
Knight arrived in Bayfield, Wisconsin, on June 30, 1869, and resided in these vicinities for the rest of his life. After about a year serving as Indian agent, he resigned his commission and returned, after a decade of military service, to the practice of law. In 1871 he became register of land in Bayfield, and remained in office through 1879. He invested in real estate and prospered until the Panic of 1873. Around this time, he renewed his friendship with William Freeman Vilas, who he had known in school. Vilas was now a prominent lawyer and politician in Madison, Wisconsin, and the two began investing in timber land in northern Wisconsin.

In 1878, he became interested in industrial development in neighboring Ashland, Wisconsin, and he relocated there in 1880. He organized the Superior Lumber Company, which became one of the largest lumber concerns in northern Wisconsin and was one of the foundational industries of Ashland. Knight became invested in a number of companies in Ashland, serving as vice president of the Ashland National Bank, invested in the First National Bank, the Ashland Brownstone Company, and the Street Railway Company. He also worked as counsel for the Wisconsin Central Railroad. When Ashland was incorporated as a city, in 1887, Colonel Knight was elected the first Mayor. He was re-elected for 1888, but resigned after seven months of his second term. In 1890, he built the Knight Block in Ashland, which was, at the time, considered one of the finest buildings in northern Wisconsin, containing offices and storerooms as well as the Hotel Knight.

Politically, Colonel Knight was a Democrat and was a prominent member of the state party. He was Chairman of the Democratic Party of Wisconsin for four years, and was a delegate to the 1888 and 1892 Democratic National Conventions. In 1890, he lost the Democratic nomination for Governor of Wisconsin by one vote. In 1893, he was a strong candidate for United States Senate after the Democrats gained control of the Wisconsin Legislature (senators, at the time, were not popularly elected), but ultimately lost out to John L. Mitchell.

== Family and personal life ==
Knight married twice. He married his first wife, Susan James Clark, on January 19, 1863, in Delaware, while he was on leave from duty in the Civil War. They had one daughter together before her death on June 29, 1867. On June 2, 1873, he married Ella Clark, the sister of his first wife, with whom he had five more children.

His daughter Mary married Joseph E. Davies who would serve as the second United States Ambassador to the Soviet Union.

Knight died of cancer on August 22, 1903, at his daughter's home in Watertown, Wisconsin.
