= Curtis Reed (politician) =

19th century American politician

8th Mayor of Menasha, Wisconsin
- In office April 1890 – April 1892
- Preceded by: Publius V. Lawson
- Succeeded by: George Banta

1st, 3rd & 7th Village President of Menasha, Wisconsin
- In office 1853, 1854, 1858, 1865, 1866, 1867

Member of the Wisconsin State Assembly from the Winnebago 2nd district
- In office January 7, 1861 – January 6, 1862
- Preceded by: George B. Goodwin
- Succeeded by: Michael Hogan
- In office January 3, 1853 – January 2, 1854
- Preceded by: Dudley Blodget (whole county)
- Succeeded by: Corydon L. Rich

Member of the Council of the Wisconsin Territory for Milwaukee & Washington counties
- In office January 5, 1846 – January 4, 1847 Serving with James Kneeland & Jacob H. Kimball
- Preceded by: Adam E. Ray
- Succeeded by: District abolished

Personal details
- Born: March 24, 1815 Westford, Massachusetts, U.S.
- Died: March 18, 1895 (aged 79) Fox Crossing, Wisconsin, U.S.
- Resting place: Oak Hill Cemetery, Neenah, Wisconsin
- Party: Democratic
- Spouse: Augusta Lydia Ripley (m. 1849; died 1893)
- Children: Charles Reed^{(b. 1851; died 1911)}; William W. Reed^{(b. 1853; died 1928)}; John Reed^{(b. 1854; died 1858)}; Harrison E. Reed^{(b. 1859; died 1940)}
- Relatives: George B. Reed (brother); Orson Reed (brother); Harrison Reed (brother); Martha Reed Mitchell (sister); Abram D. Smith (brother-in-law); Chloe Merrick Reed (sister-in-law); Alexander Mitchell (brother-in-law); John L. Mitchell (nephew)

Curtis Reed (March 24, 1815 – March 18, 1895) was an American businessman, Democratic politician, and Wisconsin pioneer. He is considered the founder of Menasha, Wisconsin, and was the first village president after its incorporation in 1853, he subsequently served as the 8th mayor of Menasha after it became a city. He also served two terms in the Wisconsin State Assembly, in 1853 and 1861.

Most of Reed's siblings were also notable politicians or married to notable politicians. His brothers were George B. Reed, Orson Reed, and Harrison Reed. His youngest sister was Martha Reed Mitchell.

== Early life ==
Curtis Reed was born on March 24, 1815, in Westford, Massachusetts. As a child, he moved with his family to a farm in Vermont, where he received much of his education. At age 16, he went to work clerking at a store in Vermont, and then at a similar job in Troy, New York.

== Early years in Wisconsin ==
In December 1835, he came west to Milwaukee, following his eldest brother George B. Reed, who had traveled there the prior year. When they first arrived, the Reed family boarded with Milwaukee founder Solomon Juneau; George Reed was one of the few lawyers present in the territory at the time and served as an advisor to Juneau. In Milwaukee, Curtis Reed again went to work as a store clerk. After the Wisconsin Territory was established in 1836, Curtis Reed was appointed undersheriff of Milwaukee County by first territorial governor Henry Dodge. At the time "Milwaukee County" comprised virtually all of the southeast quadrant of Wisconsin. Reed was part of the committee sent to escort the governor to Milwaukee from Iowa, where he had been residing prior to his appointment. As undersheriff, he was also responsible for carrying out the first census of Milwaukee County.

In the summer of 1837, Curtis went further west, with another older brother Orson Reed, to what is now the town of Summit, Waukesha County, Wisconsin. They bought farm land there and were soon joined by other members of their family. The first post office was established there in 1838, with Curtis Reed as postmaster.

At the time, that area was still part of a larger Milwaukee County. The Reeds became involved in local politics, with Curtis and Orson Reed collaborating to secure Curtis Reed's election as the first town chairman of Oconomowoc (which then comprised all of the northwest quadrant of what is now Waukesha County). In that role, he was ex officio a member of the Milwaukee County board of supervisors.

The Reeds also worked against the 1845 plan to divide Milwaukee County and create Waukesha County, but were ultimately unsuccessful. In the last election before division, however, Curtis Reed was elected to serve as a representative of Milwaukee and Washington counties in the last session of the 4th Wisconsin Territorial Assembly. After the division of Milwaukee County, Reed served on the first board of supervisors of Waukesha County.

== Career in Menasha ==
He first came to the area that is now Menasha, Wisconsin, on the Fox River, in 1845, and invested with his brother, Harrison Reed, to purchase much of the land on the island now known as Doty Island. During his term in the Territorial Assembly, he had also been granted a charter to build a dam across the Fox River. His interests in Menasha led him to collaborate with former territorial governor James Duane Doty and his son Charles Doty, who had begun surveying the land. Curtis Reed came to reside in what is now Menasha in 1848, building the first structure at the site. He initially owned about 300 acres of land there, but sold or gifted most of it away to encourage the development of the village, earning him the nickname the "father of Menasha".

He resumed his political career in Menasha, winning election to the Wisconsin State Assembly in the 1852 election, running on the Democratic Party ticket. Reed's district comprised roughly the northern half of Winnebago County. During the 1853 legislative session, he served alongside his brother, Orson Reed, who represented Waukesha County. During the 1853 session, the Legislature approved a charter for the village of Menasha, and Curtis Reed was elected the first village president. He ultimately served five more terms as village president, in 1854, 1858, 1865, 1866, and 1867. In 1860, Reed won another term in the State Assembly and served in the 1861 session.

Reed devoted much of the rest of his life to the growth and development of Menasha and the Fox River valley, encouraging and recruiting new businesses. He established the first water power at Menasha, and lent that facility to many early manufacturers. He was also a director of the Wisconsin Central Railroad, which connected Lake Superior to Milwaukee, by way of Oshkosh and Menasha.

He continued to serve in public office into his later years. After Menasha became a city, Reed was frequently a member of the city council and won two terms as mayor of Menasha, in 1890 and 1891. He also served as postmaster at Menasha during the presidential terms of Grover Cleveland. He served as mayor (1890–1891) on the Menasha Common Council.

Curtis Reed died in Menasha, Wisconsin in 1895, and was buried at Oak Hill Cemetery in Neenah.

== Personal life and family ==
Curtis Reed was the sixth of eight children born to Seth Harrison Reed and his wife Rhoda (née Finney). The Reed family were descendants of the colonist Philip Reade, who came to the Massachusetts Bay Colony from England in the 1660s. Nearly all of Curtis Reed's seven siblings were notable in some way:

- Julia Ann Reed (1806–1881) married physician Thomas J. Noyes who was the president of Milwaukee's first medical society, and the first doctor at Menasha, Wisconsin.
- George B. Reed (1807–1883) was the first village president of Manitowoc, Wisconsin, and served three terms in the Wisconsin Senate, overlapping with Orson Reed's Senate term in 1866 and 1867. He was also a prominent railroad executive, known as the "father of the Wisconsin Central Railroad", which linked Lake Superior to Milwaukee. He died in the Newhall House Hotel Fire.
- Orson Reed (1809–c.1890) was a member of the Wisconsin Senate and Assembly and served as sheriff of Waukesha County.
- Mary Augusta Reed (1811–1866) married attorney Abram D. Smith who became one of the first elected justices of the Wisconsin Supreme Court.
- Harrison Jackson Reed (1813–1899) was one of the original owners of the Milwaukee Sentinel and an early editor of the Wisconsin State Journal, and then became one of the founders of Neenah, Wisconsin. Later he moved to Florida and, during reconstruction, he became the 9th governor of Florida.
- Martha Reed (1818–1902) married the prominent Milwaukee banker and congressman Alexander Mitchell and became a philanthropist. Their son John L. Mitchell was a U.S. senator; their grandson, Billy Mitchell, is considered the father of the United States Air Force.
- Herbert Reed (1822–1875) was a railroad depot agent in Iowa County, Wisconsin.

Curtis Reed married Augusta Lydia Ripley in 1849, at Jefferson County, New York. They had at least four children together and were married for 43 years before her death in 1893.

Wisconsin State Assembly
Preceded by Dudley Blodget (whole county)	Member of the Wisconsin State Assembly from the Winnebago 2nd district January 3, 1853 – January 2, 1854	Succeeded by Corydon L. Rich
Preceded by George B. Goodwin	Member of the Wisconsin State Assembly from the Winnebago 2nd district January 7, 1861 – January 6, 1862	Succeeded by Michael Hogan
Political offices
Preceded by Publius V. Lawson	Mayor of Menasha, Wisconsin; April 1890 – April 1892	Succeeded by George Banta
