= Joel R. Carpenter =

American attorney

Joel R. Carpenter (1819? - January 1892) was an American attorney from Oconomowoc, Wisconsin who served a single term in the Wisconsin State Assembly.

== Background ==
He came to Oconomowoc in 1848, and was the first practicing lawyer there. In 1855, he was a justice of the peace in that town.

== Legislature ==
Carpenter was elected in 1863 for a single one-year term as a member of the Wisconsin State Assembly from the 2nd Waukesha County district (the Towns of Merton, Oconomowoc, Summit, and Delafield), defeating Democrat John D. McDonald (Democratic incumbent Elisha W. Edgerton was not a candidate). He was assigned to the standing committees on expiration and re-enactment of laws, and on privileges and elections.

He was elected as a member of the National Union Party. He was succeeded the next year by John N. Cadby, also of the National Union Party.

== Later life ==
Carpenter was reported in late January, 1892, as having recently died "aged nearly 73 years" after being in failing health for some time. He left a widow and six children. Other reports describe him as being aged 74; and he was said to have "held many local offices".
