= List of Union units from Florida in the American Civil War =

This is a list of Florida Union Civil War units. The list of Florida Confederate Civil War units is shown separately. Although Florida seceded there was a pro-Union and anti-Confederate minority in the state, an element that grew as the war progressed. Thus over 2,200 Floridians served in Union units.

== Cavalry ==
- 1st Florida Cavalry Regiment (Union)
- 2nd Florida Cavalry Regiment (Union)
  - Independent Union Rangers of Taylor County
- 1st East Florida Cavalry (Union)
- Florida Rangers (were eventually consolidated into the 2nd Florida Cavalry)

== Miscellaneous ==
- Florida Irregulars
- Unassigned Florida Volunteers
- Union Volunteer Corp Key West Florida

== See also ==
- Lists of American Civil War units by state
- Florida in the Civil War
- Southern Unionists

== Sources and External links ==
- "Florida Cavalry Regiments of the Union Army muster rolls, 1863-1865". State Archives of Florida. Office of the Adjutant General of Florida. Archived from the original on 7 April 2014.
- "Union Regimental Index - Florida". The Civil War Archive.
