= Auburn H. Erwin =

Religious and political leader in Florida

Auburn H. Erwin (born November 1834) was an American teacher, A.M.E. minister, justice of the peace, constable, and state legislator in Florida. He was a delegate to the 1868 Florida Constitutional Convention and represented Columbia County, Florida in the Florida House of Representatives from 1868-1870. He was a constable in Duval County in 1872 and in 1878 and 1879. He served as a justice of the peace for Duval County in 1873 and 1874.

He was born in Pennsylvania. He received one nominating vote for U.S. Senator. He and E. J. Harris submitted the minority report finding no wrongdoing on the part of Florida governor Harrison Reed. He served on the Committee on Corporations and signed onto a report recommending against a special act of incorporation for the Perdido Canal and Milling Company and Richeson Spring Hotel Company.

== See also ==
- African American officeholders from the end of the Civil War until before 1900
