= 2nd Florida Cavalry Regiment =

2nd Florida Cavalry Regiment may refer to:

- 2nd Florida Cavalry Regiment (Confederate)
- 2nd Florida Cavalry Regiment (Union)
