= David Montgomery (Florida politician) =

Florida politician

- Born: 1836
- Died: April 23, 1878 (aged 41–42)
- Occupations: sheriff, tax collector, local politician and state legislator

David Montgomery (c. 1836 - April 23, 1878) was a sheriff, tax collector, local politician and state legislator in Florida. He ran for Lieutenant Governor.

Originally from New York, he worked as a mason in Key West and Tallahassee before settling in Madison County, Florida.

In 1870 he narrowly escaped being murdered by a group of men.

Florida governor Harrison Reed appointed him sheriff.
