= John L. Mitchell =

American politician and philanthropist (1842–1904)

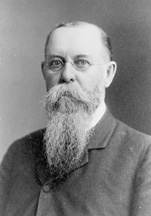

United States Senator from Wisconsin
- In office March 4, 1893 – March 3, 1899
- Preceded by: Philetus Sawyer
- Succeeded by: Joseph V. Quarles

Member of the U.S. House of Representatives from Wisconsin's 4th district
- In office March 4, 1891 – March 3, 1893
- Preceded by: Isaac W. Van Schaick
- Succeeded by: Peter J. Somers

Member of the Wisconsin Senate from the 6th district
- In office January 3, 1876 – January 7, 1878
- Preceded by: John Black
- Succeeded by: George Howard Paul
- In office January 1, 1872 – January 5, 1874
- Preceded by: Peter V. Deuster
- Succeeded by: John Black

Personal details
- Born: John Lendrum Mitchell; October 19, 1842 Milwaukee, Wisconsin Territory
- Died: June 29, 1904 (aged 61) Milwaukee, Wisconsin, U.S.
- Resting place: Forest Home Cemetery, Milwaukee
- Party: Democratic
- Spouses: Bianca Cogswell (m. 1865; died 1882); Harriet Danforth (Becker); (m. 1883; died 1922)
- Children: 12, including Billy and Ruth
- Parents: Alexander Mitchell (father); Martha Reed Mitchell (mother)
- Relatives: George B. Reed (uncle); Orson Reed (uncle); Harrison Reed (uncle); Curtis Reed (uncle); Abram D. Smith (uncle); Chloe Merrick Reed (aunt)

Military service
- Allegiance: United States
- Branch/service: United States Volunteers (Union Army)
- Years of service: 1862–1863
- Rank: 1st Lieutenant, USV
- Unit: 24th Reg. Wis. Vol. Infantry
- Battles/wars: American Civil War: Confederate Heartland Offensive (2nd Lt., Co. I); Battle of Perryville; Stones River Campaign (2nd Lt., Co. I); Battle of Stones River; Tullahoma campaign (1st Lt., Co. E); Battle of Hoover's Gap; Chattanooga campaign (1st Lt., Co. E)

John Lendrum Mitchell (October 19, 1842 – June 29, 1904) was an American politician and philanthropist from Milwaukee, Wisconsin. A Democrat, he served one term each in the United States Senate (1893–1899) and House of Representatives (1891–1893). Earlier, he was a member of the Wisconsin State Senate and a Union Army officer in the American Civil War.

He was the son of powerful railroad owner and Milwaukee financier Alexander Mitchell and used his inheritance on significant works of philanthropy in Milwaukee—he is the namesake of the Mitchell Park Horticultural Conservatory.

His son, U.S. Army Major General William Lendrum "Billy" Mitchell, is considered the father of the United States Air Force, and the namesake of Milwaukee Mitchell International Airport.

== Early life ==
He was born in Milwaukee in the Wisconsin Territory, the son of Martha (Reed) and Alexander Mitchell, a wealthy banking magnate, politician, and Scottish American immigrant. He graduated from the Hampton, Connecticut, military academy and studied in Europe, spending time in both Munich, Bavaria, and Geneva, Switzerland. He returned to the United States in 1860 as the Civil War loomed.

== Civil War service ==
During the American Civil War, Mitchell enlisted with the 24th Wisconsin Infantry Regiment in the summer of 1862. He was commissioned 2nd Lieutenant of Company I, under Captain Frederick A. Root. The regiment mustered into service August 21, 1862, and left the state on September 5 for Kentucky, for service in the Western Theater of the war. Arriving at Louisville, Kentucky, on September 20, the 24th Wisconsin was attached to III Corps of the Army of the Ohio.

The regiment was quickly thrown into battle, confronting General Braxton Bragg and his Army of Mississippi, which had marched to the vicinity of Louisville as part of the Confederate offensive to seize control of Kentucky. They met the Confederates at the nearby town of Perryville, Kentucky, where they engaged in the Battle of Perryville on October 8, 1862. The 24th Wisconsin was held in reserve for most of the battle, but in the late afternoon was ordered to engage and pursued the enemy as they fled the field. They continued the pursuit of the fleeing Confederates until October 15, when they were ordered to abandon pursuit and turn back to the west, moving into Tennessee and going into camp near Nashville on November 22.

At their Mill Creek camp, the Union command was reorganized as the Army of the Cumberland under Major General William Rosecrans. On December 27, they returned to the offensive against Bragg, who was now encamped along the Stones River, northwest of Murfreesboro, Tennessee. During this campaign, Lieutenant Mitchell was selected for special service in their brigade, working as a topographical aide to Brigadier General Joshua W. Sill. During the first hours of fighting at the Battle of Stones River, however, General Sill was killed in action while directing a counterattack. It fell to Lieutenant Mitchell to deliver the news to Colonel Nicholas Greusel of the 36th Illinois Infantry Regiment—who was next in line of seniority—that he must assume command of the brigade. Colonel Greusel was able to re-form the brigade after the confusion of the morning fighting and led them ably through the remainder of the battle. Colonel Greusel would later praise Lieutenant Mitchell in his official report of the battle. (Note: United States War Record Office, Series 1, v. 20:1, p. 357; Of my staff, I would especially notice ... Lieut. J. L. Mitchell, aide-de-camp... –N. Greusel, Colonel, Commanding First Brigade, Third Division)

After the fighting, the Union army spent several months camped at Murfreesboro, transforming it into a major Union fortress and supply hub for the remainder of the war and securing the Union presence in Middle Tennessee. During this time, the 24th Wisconsin saw further resignations and promotions as the leadership was reshuffled. Mitchell returned to duties with his regiment, and, on January 17, 1863, he was promoted to 1st Lieutenant for Company E.

While the Union Army of the Cumberland was reinforcing their position and reorganizing their force at Murfreesboro, the Confederate Army of Tennessee, under Bragg, was preparing a new defensive line along the Duck River and at strategic passes in the Highland Rim. That summer, the Army of the Cumberland was directed to engage Bragg as soon as possible to prevent him from sending additional forces to assist the Confederate defenders at the Siege of Vicksburg. Lieutenant Mitchell was with the army through the Battle of Hoover's Gap, after which Bragg abandoned Middle Tennessee and moved to defend Chattanooga. However, around this time the regiment surgeon diagnosed Lieutenant Mitchell as having a severe visual impairment. He was sent home to Wisconsin and discharged.

== Political career ==
After returning from the war, Mitchell went to work as a farmer, clearing 480 acres of wilderness west of Milwaukee. In 1871, he entered politics, running for Wisconsin State Senate on the Democratic Party ticket in the 6th senatorial district (southern Milwaukee County). He was not a candidate for re-election in 1873, but returned to office with the 1875 election, in the same district. He declined re-nomination in 1877, but remained active in the state Democratic Party and for several years was chairman of the Milwaukee County Democratic Party. He was also elected by the 1887 Wisconsin Democratic convention to serve as a Wisconsin member of the Democratic National Committee.

He was also active outside of politics and was chosen as President of the Milwaukee School Board for 1884 and 1885 and became a significant funder of Milwaukee's Soldiers' home. He was appointed by Congress to the board of managers for the National Home for Disabled Soldiers in 1886 and served on the board nearly until his death. After the death of his father in 1887, Mitchell took over several of the family interests and became much more prominent in state affairs; he also became well-respected in business for his shrewd management of the family assets. He became President of the Marine and Fire Insurance Company Bank—which his father had founded—and had a significant stake in the Northwestern National Insurance Company. In 1888, after a storm destroyed several buildings on the state fair grounds, Mitchell spent freely from his own funds to rebuild the structures in time for the fair. That year, he was elected President of the state Agricultural Society.

In 1890, Mitchell announced his intention to run for United States House of Representatives in Wisconsin's 4th congressional district. After a contentious caucus process, he reached the Wisconsin Democratic Party 4th district convention with strong support and was nominated on the first ballot, defeating Peter J. Somers and John Black. He won 56% of the vote in the general election, defeating Republican R. C. Spencer, Union Labor candidate Robert C. Schilling, and Prohibitionist Charles E. Reed, and went on to serve in the 52nd United States Congress. After his election to Congress, he was chosen as chairman of the Democratic Congressional Campaign Committee and conducted an extensive operation to win Democratic majorities in both the House and Senate in the 1892 elections.

He also declared his interest in the United States Senate seat which would be chosen in 1893 by the Legislature elected in 1892. The Democrats maintained their majority in the 41st Wisconsin Legislature, and on the 31st ballot, the Democratic caucus chose to support Mitchell as their senate nominee over John H. Knight and Edward S. Bragg. In the floor vote, Mitchell received 77 votes, John Coit Spooner received 46, and Edward S. Bragg received 1.

Mitchell was considered one of the best-educated members of the Senate at the time. He continued to prioritize funding the needs of veterans. He supported the Wilson–Gorman Tariff Act, which levied a tariff which applied only to those earning more than $4,000 per year (then only about 10% of Americans). He was strongly opposed to the rising American imperialism of his era, and spoke out against the annexation of Hawaii and the Spanish–American War. And although he personally opposed the populist, inflationary free silver policies of the Democrats, he remained loyal to the party. In 1896, he was suggested as a candidate for Vice President of the United States at the Democratic National Convention, though his name was not formally placed in nomination. He served in the Senate until 1899 and was not a candidate for renomination.

After leaving the Senate, Mitchell traveled with his family to Europe again. He, along with one of his daughters, studied at Grenoble University in Grenoble, France, and they both received a diploma certifying their proficiency in French language and literature. The family returned to their farm in Greenfield, Wisconsin, in 1902. Mitchell's health deteriorated from this point. He died at his home on June 29, 1904, and was buried at the Mitchell family plot in Milwaukee's Forest Home Cemetery.

== Family and legacy ==
Mitchell married twice, first to Bianca Coggswell and then Harriet Danforth Becker, who was a prominent member of the Daughters of the American Revolution. He had at least 12 children (7 with his first wife and 5 with his second) however only 7 survived to adulthood.

Among his children was Major General Billy Mitchell, who is regarded as the father of the United States Air Force. Coincidentally, during the elder Mitchell's time with the 24th Wisconsin Infantry in the Civil War, he served alongside Arthur MacArthur Jr., whose son, Douglas MacArthur, would go on to serve as a juror on the court martial of Mitchell's son, Billy, in 1925.

Another son, John Mitchell, was also an early American aviator who died in his fighter plane in 1917 in France. His daughter, Ruth Mitchell, was an author and gained some fame as a volunteer fighting the Germans with Yugoslav Chetniks in World War II.

Mitchell was a collector of paintings, including works by Jules Breton, Jehan Georges Vibert, and Adolf Schreyer. He was a patron of the Layton Art Gallery, Milwaukee College, and the Milwaukee Hospital. He was an active member of several veterans communities, including the Grand Army of the Republic, the Military Order of the Loyal Legion of the United States, and the Society of the Army of the Cumberland. He contributed to the founding of the College of Agriculture at the University of Wisconsin and offered twenty scholarships for poor boys to attend the school. Finally, he was the original donor of land to form Mitchell Park, which is named in his honor.

His papers, along with those of his father, are in the archives of the Wisconsin Historical Society.

== Electoral history ==
=== U.S. House of Representatives (1890, 1892) ===
Wisconsin's 4th Congressional District Election, 1890
Party	Candidate	Votes	%	±%
General Election, November 4, 1890
Democratic	John L. Mitchell	24,679	56.18%	+8.87%
Republican	Robert C. Spencer	17,605	40.07%	−10.72%
Labor	Robert C. Schilling	1,505	3.43%	
Prohibition	Charles E. Reed	133	0.30%	−0.39%
	Scattering	10	0.02%	
Plurality		7,074	16.10%	+12.61%
Total votes		43,932	100.0%	+0.47%
Democratic gain from Republican		Swing	19.59%	

Wisconsin's 4th Congressional District Election, 1892
Party	Candidate	Votes	%	±%
General Election, November 8, 1892
Democratic	John L. Mitchell (incumbent)	19,616	50.18%	−5.99%
Republican	Theobald Otjen	18,294	46.80%	+6.73%
Populist	Theodore Fritz	829	2.12%	
Prohibition	Ephraim L. Eaton	349	0.89%	+0.59%
Plurality		1,322	3.38%	-12.72%
Total votes		39,088	100.0%	-11.03%
Democratic hold				

=== United States Senate (1893) ===
United States Senate Election in Wisconsin, 1893
Party	Candidate	Votes	%	±%
Vote of the Wisconsin Legislature, January 27, 1893
Democratic	John L. Mitchell	77	58.33%	
Republican	John Coit Spooner	46	34.85%	
Democratic	Edward S. Bragg	1	0.76%	
	No vote	8	6.06%	
Plurality		31	23.48%	
Total votes		132	100.0%	
Democratic gain from Republican				

== Notes ==
Wisconsin Senate
Preceded by Peter V. Deuster	Member of the Wisconsin Senate from the 6th district January 1, 1872 – January 5, 1874	Succeeded by John Black
Preceded by John Black	Member of the Wisconsin Senate from the 6th district January 3, 1876 – January 7, 1878	Succeeded by George Howard Paul
U.S. House of Representatives
Preceded by Isaac W. Van Schaick	Member of the U.S. House of Representatives from Wisconsin's 4th congressional district March 4, 1891 – March 3, 1893	Succeeded by Peter J. Somers
U.S. Senate
Preceded by Philetus Sawyer	U.S. senator (Class 1) from Wisconsin; 1893–1899; Served alongside: William F. Vilas, John C. Spooner	Succeeded by Joseph V. Quarles
