= Samuel T. Day =

American politician

Samuel T. Day was an American medical doctor, plantation owner, and politician who served as the fourth Lieutenant Governor of Florida from January 3, 1871 to June 3, 1872.

Born in Hanover County, Virginia, around 1828, in 1856 Day was a candidate for the state legislature in Columbia County, Florida. Day was a Union supporter during the Civil War. After the war, he helped organize the Republican Party in the state. Day was nominated for the job of U.S. Consul in Winnipeg, Manitoba, Canada, by President Ulysses S. Grant in May 1870 and approved by the Senate but evidently declined because the Florida Republican Party had just nominated him in a special election to replace Lt. Gov. Edmund C. Weeks, whose legitimacy was questionable (he had been appointed by the governor). The election was marred by violence, and the Republican-controlled election board declared Day the winner over his Democratic opponent, William D. Bloxham. Bloxham was ultimately declared the winner by the Florida Supreme Court, but not until June 1, 1872.

After Governor Harrison Reed was impeached in February 1872, Reed left Tallahassee and Day declared himself governor on February 10. Reed returned to the capital in April 1872, disputed the governorship, and appealed to the Florida Supreme Court to settle the dispute. The court decided that, under the Florida constitution, the governor's powers were suspended until he was acquitted - including the power to request opinions from the court. However, Day was "in no sense governor", he was merely empowered to act as governor while the governor was impeached. A special session of the legislature dismissed the charges on May 4, and Day did not become governor.

The unfriendly Daily Phoenix of Columbia, South Carolina remarked of the struggle between Reed and Day, "They are both political adventurers of the purest dye, and are both, doubtless, unfit to fill the high office over which they are squabbling; but Reed is a confirmed and known scoundrel. ... Day is, comparatively, an honest man, and with him, therefore, is the sympathy or preference of the people."

Day married Celeta Cook Weeks (1836 - 1905) on May 25, 1854. Weeks was the sister of William Theophilus Weeks, a Florida state representative and signer of the post Civil War Florida constitution. Samuel and Celeta had three children, including De Motte Day (1855-1944).

Day later moved to Caldwell County, Texas, and died there on December 26, 1877.

Political offices
Preceded by Edmund C. Weeks	Lieutenant Governor of Florida; 1871–1872	Succeeded by Marcellus Stearns
