= Edmund C. Weeks =

American politician

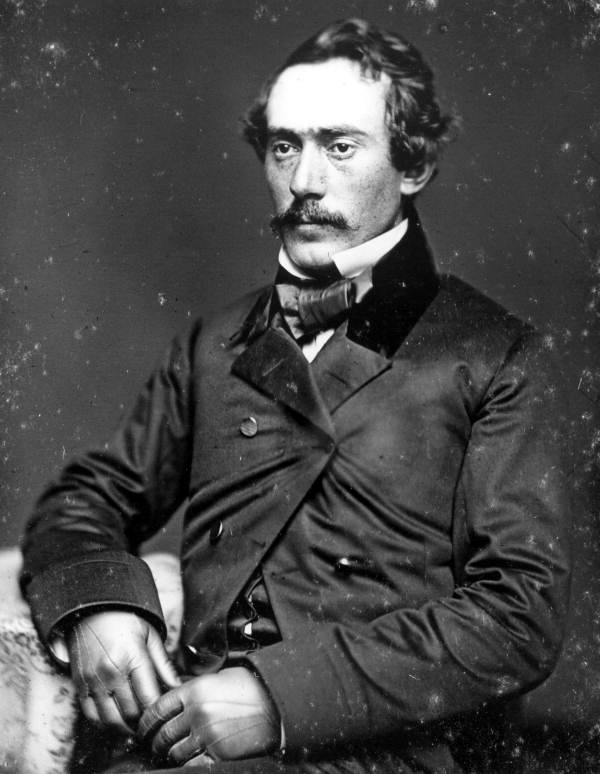

3rd Lieutenant Governor of Florida
- In office January 24, 1870 – December 27, 1870
- Governor: Harrison Reed
- Preceded by: William Henry Gleason
- Succeeded by: Samuel T. Day

Personal details
- Born: March 10, 1829 Tisbury, Massachusetts
- Died: April 12, 1907 (aged 78) Tallahassee, Florida
- Party: Republican
- Spouse(s): Mary Jones; Elizabeth Hunt Crafts

Edmund Cottle Weeks (March 10, 1829 – April 12, 1907) was an American politician who served as the third Lieutenant Governor of Florida.

== Early life ==
A Massachusetts native, Weeks was born in the town of Tisbury, on Martha's Vineyard, to Captain Hiram Weeks and Margaret D. Cottle, a relative of New York Senator Thomas C. Platt. After accompanying his father on a voyage to South America, Weeks studied medicine for three years at the College of Physicians and Surgeons in New York City. However, his love for the sea compelled him to become a sailor and later a partner in a boat operating firm. During the American Civil War, he volunteered for the Union Navy in the Battle of New Orleans. He then commanded the Union Army's 2nd Florida Cavalry with the rank of major. After the war, he settled in Tallahassee, Florida.

== Lieutenant governorship ==
Weeks was appointed to the office of Lieutenant Governor of Florida by Governor Harrison Reed on January 24, 1870, to fill the vacancy left after the dismissal of William H. Gleason. He took the oath of office that same day. However, his appointment was controversial. State Comptroller Robert H. Gamble, claiming that the Governor could not make an appointment to an elected position, refused to pay Weeks his salary until Weeks took the case to the Florida Supreme Court. On his first day presiding over the Senate, a majority of the senators walked out on the session. At the next day's meeting, another senator occupied his seat. After a motion was proposed to arrest him, he left early.

As Weeks's term was intended to be temporary, Governor Reed called for an election to be held on November 8. Samuel T. Day was elected Lieutenant Governor, and when the legislature met on January 3, 1871, Day took office as prescribed by the state constitution. On January 12, Weeks again appealed to the Supreme Court, accusing Day of "usurping" his office, which he believed should last for two additional years, the remainder of his predecessor's term. However, the court ruled that Governor Reed had the power to call the election and that Weeks's appointment had expired on December 27, 1870, when the election results were certified.

== Later life ==
Weeks later represented Leon County in the Florida Legislature, in the Florida House of Representatives. and served as the Leon County sheriff. A Republican, he ran unsuccessfully for the House of Representatives against incumbent Robert H. M. Davidson in 1878. In 1890, President Benjamin Harrison appointed him U.S. Marshal for the Northern District of Florida.

Weeks married twice: first to Mary Jones in London, and then to Elizabeth Hunt Crafts in Tallahassee on June 6, 1890. He died in Tallahassee in 1907 at the age of 78.

Political offices
| Preceded by William Henry Gleason | Lieutenant Governor of Florida; 1870 | Succeeded by Samuel T. Day |
