= Alexander Mitchell (Wisconsin politician) =

Scottish-American businessman politician (1817-1887)

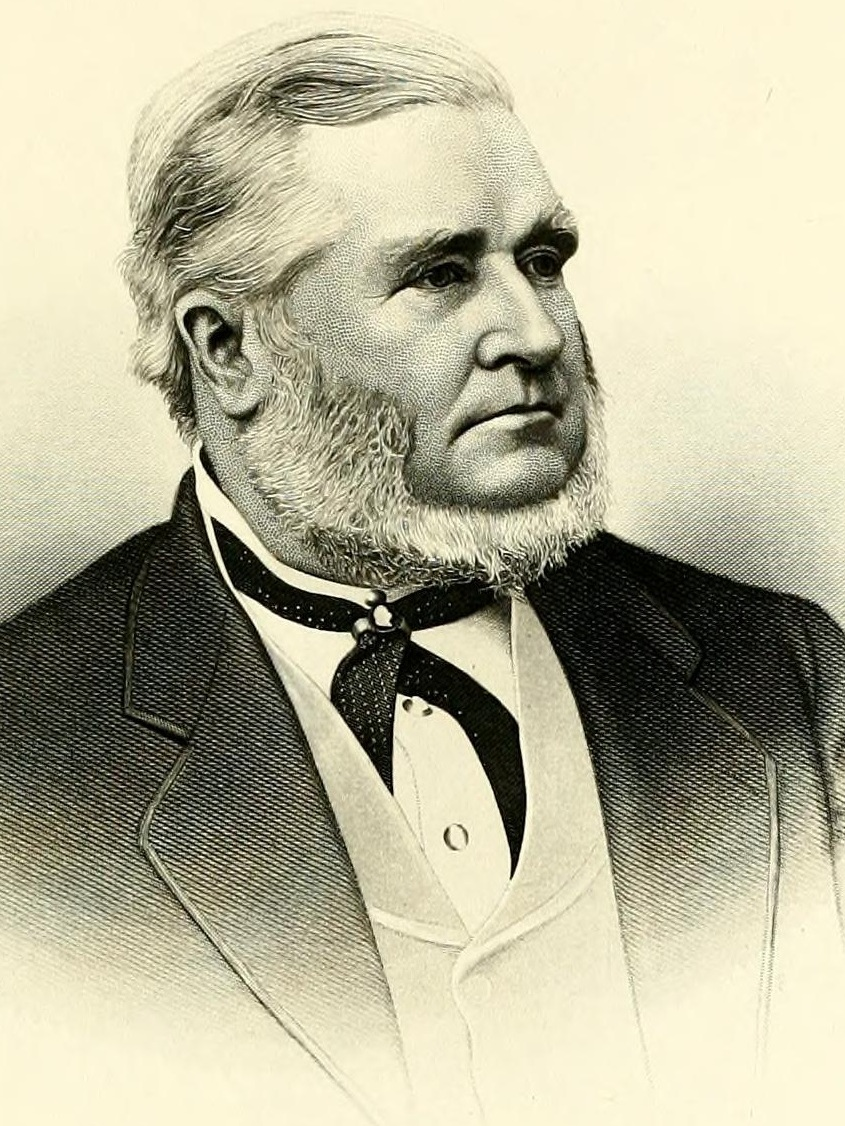

Member of the U.S. House of Representatives from Wisconsin
- In office March 4, 1871 – March 3, 1875
- Preceded by: Halbert E. Paine (1st); Charles A. Eldredge (4th)
- Succeeded by: Charles G. Williams (1st); William P. Lynde (4th)
- Constituency: 1st district (1871-73); 4th district (1873-75)

Personal details
- Born: October 17, 1817 Ellon, Aberdeenshire, UK
- Died: April 19, 1887 (aged 69) New York, New York, U.S.
- Party: Democratic
- Spouse: Martha Reed (m. 1841)
- Children: John Lendrum Mitchell
- Relatives: George B. Reed (brother-in-law); Orson Reed (brother-in-law); Harrison Reed (brother-in-law); Curtis Reed (brother-in-law); Billy Mitchell (grandson); Ruth Mitchell (granddaughter)
- Occupation: Banker, investor, railroad magnate, politician

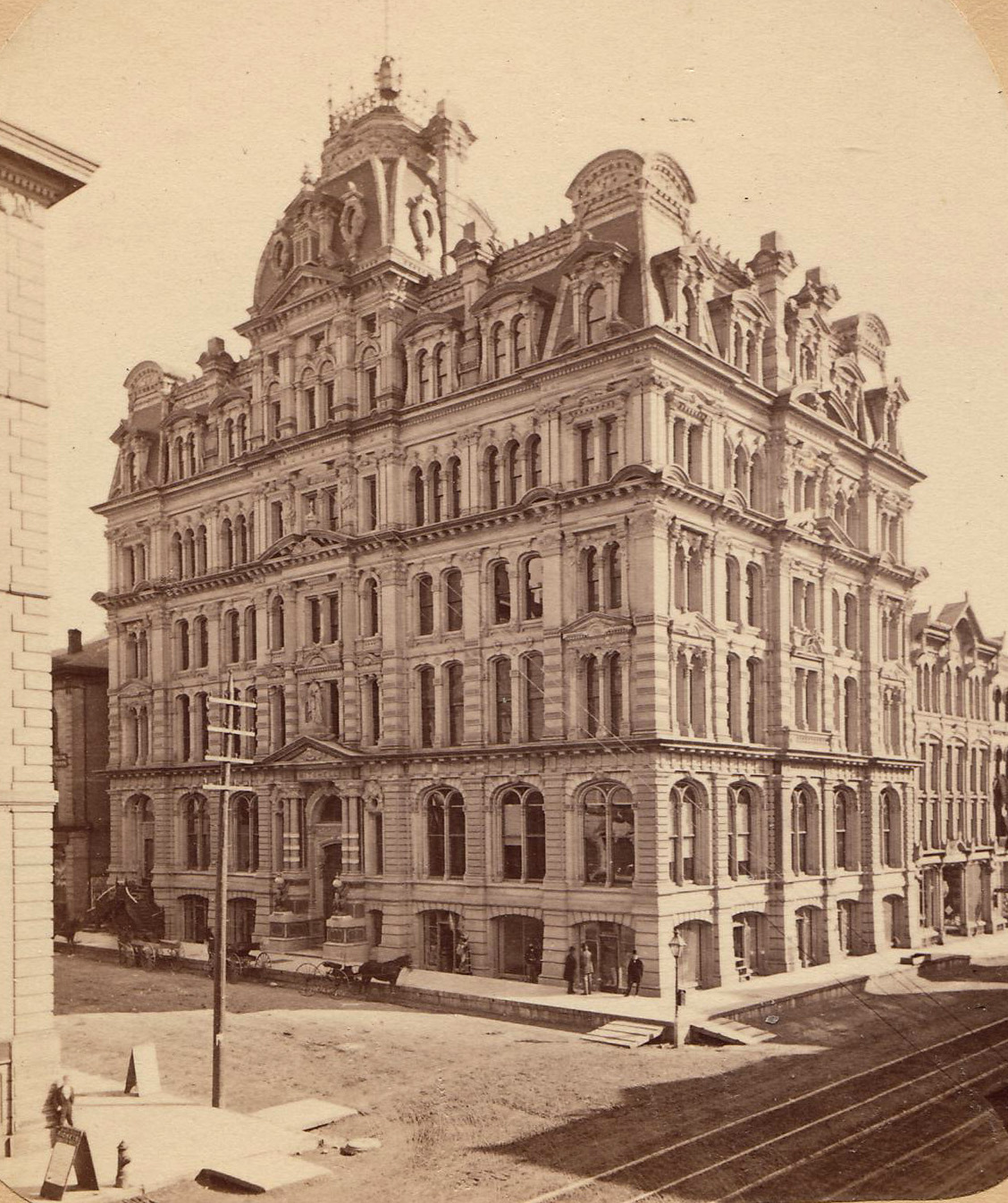
The Mitchell Building, downtown Milwaukee

Alexander Mitchell (October 17, 1817 – April 19, 1887) was a Scottish-American immigrant, banker, railroad financier, Democratic politician, and Wisconsin pioneer. He was a major contributor to the early economic development of the city of Milwaukee and was president of the Wisconsin Marine and Fire Insurance Company Bank and the Chicago, Milwaukee and St. Paul Railway. He also served two terms in the U.S. House of Representatives, representing southeast Wisconsin from 1871 to 1875. He commissioned and is the namesake of the historic Mitchell Building in downtown Milwaukee.

Mitchell's wife, Martha Reed Mitchell, was a notable philanthropist; her brother was Harrison Reed, the Reconstruction era governor of Florida.

Mitchell's son, John L. Mitchell, also served in Congress and became one of Wisconsin's U.S. senators. John Mitchell's son, Billy Mitchell, was a United States Army Air Service general and played a critical role in the establishment of the United States Air Force. Billy Mitchell is also the namesake of Milwaukee Mitchell International Airport.

== Early life ==
Mitchell was born in Ellon, Aberdeenshire, Scotland, the son of Margaret (Lendrum) and John Mitchell, in 1817 and immigrated to the United States in 1839. He pursued a career in banking in Milwaukee, and founded the Marine Bank of Wisconsin.

== Business career ==
Mitchell was president of the Chicago, Milwaukee and St. Paul Railway from 1864 to 1887. With fellow director Jeremiah Milbank (1818–1884) he built this railroad into one of the most profitable in the United States, and Mitchell became the wealthiest person in Wisconsin.

== Political career ==
Mitchell represented Wisconsin's 1st congressional district in the Forty-second United States Congress. After redistricting he represented Wisconsin's 4th congressional district in the Forty-third United States Congress. He was nominated for Governor of Wisconsin by the Democratic Party in 1877, but he declined to run.

== Curling enthusiast ==
He was an avid curler, and helped popularize the sport in the United States. Mitchell helped found the Milwaukee Curling Club in the 1840s, and he was elected patron of the Grand National Curling Club.

== Death and burial ==
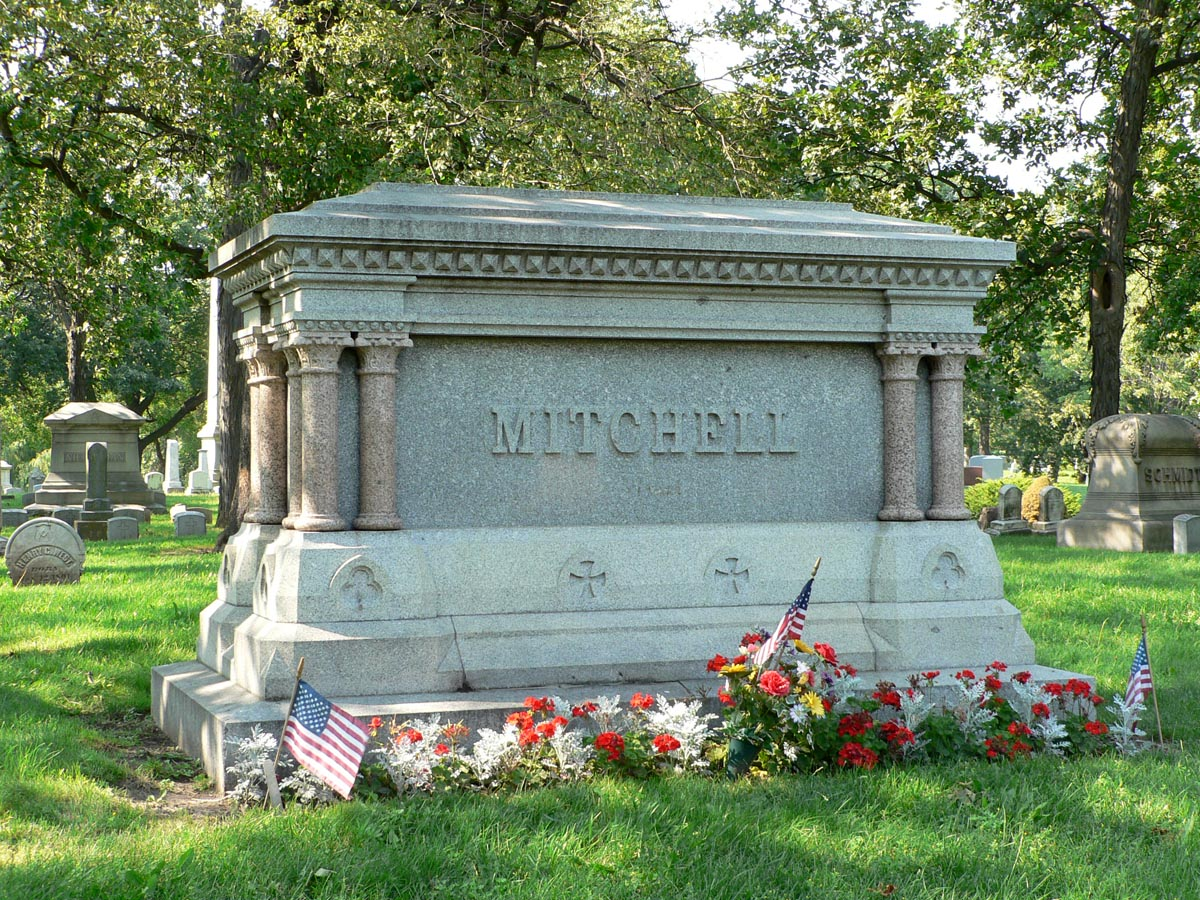
Mitchell family monument at Forest Home Cemetery

Mitchell died in New York City and was buried at Forest Home Cemetery in Milwaukee.

== Legacy ==
Mitchell owned a mansion across the street from the Milwaukee County Courthouse, which is now the site of the Wisconsin Club.

The Historic Mitchell Street neighborhood was named in his honor, as was the city of Mitchell, South Dakota, incorporated in 1881.

In World War II, the United States Liberty ship SS Alexander Mitchell was named in his honor.

The Mackie Building, which was constructed by Mitchell as an investment property, is listed on the National Register of Historic Places. Additionally, the Mitchell Building, which he also built, is listed on the National Register of Historic Places as well.

His papers, along with those of his son John, are in the archives of the Wisconsin Historical Society.

== Family ==
Mitchell was married to Martha Reed, sister of Harrison Reed, who served as Governor of Florida during Reconstruction. Mitchell's son, John L. Mitchell, was a Congressman and United States Senator, and his grandson, Billy Mitchell, was a United States Army officer prominent during the early days of military aviation.

The Villa Alexandria estate was located in the San Marco neighborhood of Jacksonville, Florida.

== See also ==
- Milwaukee Art Museum

U.S. House of Representatives
Preceded by Halbert E. Paine	Member of the U.S. House of Representatives from Wisconsin's 1st congressional district March 4, 1871 – March 3, 1873	Succeeded by Charles G. Williams
Preceded by Charles A. Eldredge	Member of the U.S. House of Representatives from Wisconsin's 4th congressional district March 4, 1873 – March 3, 1875	Succeeded by William Pitt Lynde
