= Abram D. Smith =

American lawyer and pioneer (1811–1865)

The Honorable Abram D. Smith
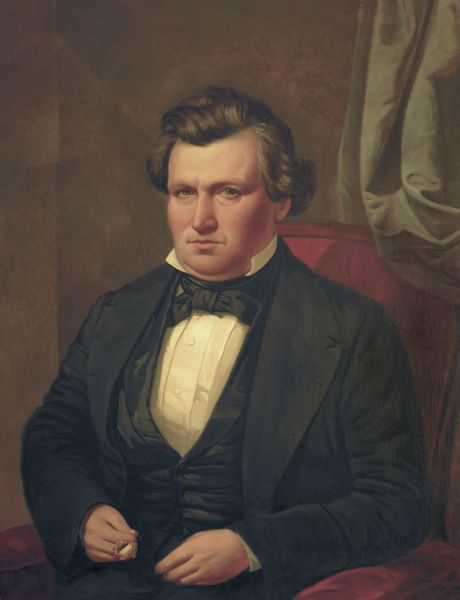
- Smith in 1856

Justice of the Wisconsin Supreme Court
- In office June 1853 – June 1859
- Preceded by: Position established
- Succeeded by: Byron Paine

Personal details
- Born: June 9, 1811 Lowville, New York, U.S.
- Died: June 3, 1865 (aged 53) New York, New York, U.S.
- Resting place: Forest Home Cemetery; Milwaukee, Wisconsin, U.S.
- Party: Democratic
- Spouse: Mary Augusta Reed (m. 1832; died 1866)
- Children: Mary Francis (Huggins) (Chapin); (b. 1834; died 1916); Maria Cecilia (Candee); (b. 1839; died 1921); Marius Smith; (b. 1843; died 1844); Marion Augusta (Andrews); (b. 1846; died 1915)
- Relatives: George B. Reed (brother-in-law); Orson Reed (brother-in-law); Harrison Reed (brother-in-law); Curtis Reed (brother-in-law); Martha Reed Mitchell (sister-in-law); John L. Mitchell (nephew)

Abram Daniel Smith (June 9, 1811 – June 3, 1865), often abbreviated A. D. Smith, was an American lawyer, politician, and pioneer. As a leader of the Hunters' Lodges, he was elected President of the Republic of Canada in the midst of the Canadian Rebellions of 1837–1838. Later, he became a prominent lawyer in the Wisconsin Territory, and was one of the first justices of the Wisconsin Supreme Court, where he authored a major opinion against the Fugitive Slave Act of 1850.

== Early life ==
Smith was born in Lowville, New York. He eventually settled in Sackets Harbor, New York, where he read law. Smith was a fervent member of the Equal Rights Party (also known as the Locofocos) an anti-Tammany faction of the Democratic Party in New York. They emphasized economic justice, and equal rights for all.

He married Mary Augusta Reed (1811-1866) of Westford, Massachusetts, in the fall of 1832. Mary's family settled in Tyngsboro, Massachusetts, then at Castleton, Vermont. Smith probably met her there when he was attending Castleton Medical School, graduating in 1831. The Smiths moved to Cleveland, Ohio, in 1836 or 1837, and he was elected a justice of the peace in Cleveland in March 1837.

== Canadian Rebellion ==
In Cleveland, Smith was a prominent leader of the Hunters' Lodge, a paramilitary organization which aligned itself with Canadian anti-royalist rebellions taking place in 1837 and 1838. After the rebels declared a new Republic of Canada, Smith was elected its president at a convention of Hunters' Lodges in Cleveland in September 1838. The Lodges were organized much like the Freemasons, of which Smith was also a member. In sympathy with the Canadian rebellion, the Hunters' Lodges launched the Patriot War against Canada in 1838, but it was ultimately unsuccessful due to the combined efforts of both the American and British governments.

== Wisconsin ==
Smith moved to Milwaukee around 1842, and established a law practice. In December 1844, he was elected High Priest of the Milwaukee Royal Arch Chapter. The Grand Lodge of Wisconsin was formed on December 18, 1843, composed of three lodges (Warren, Madison, and New Diggings). By 1845, Smith was appointed deputy Grand Master of the Grand Lodge. He was a candidate for Mayor of Milwaukee in 1851, but was unsuccessful.

== Supreme Court ==
In 1853, he was elected to the newly established Wisconsin Supreme Court. One of his most famous decisions was the case In Re: Booth, in 1854, in which abolitionist Sherman Booth was charged with assisting the escape of former slave Joshua Glover in violation of the Fugitive Slave Act of 1850. Booth's attorney, Byron Paine, sought relief from the Wisconsin Supreme Court and obtained an order from Judge Smith freeing Booth and ruling that the Fugitive Slave Act was an unconstitutional usurpation of state authority. His decision was challenged before the full Wisconsin Supreme Court by United States Attorney John Sharpstein, but the full court unanimously concurred that the arrest order for Booth was defective, and, in a 2-1 decision, concurred that the Fugitive Slave Act was unconstitutional. Wisconsin was the first state to declare the Fugitive Slave Act to be unconstitutional, and the case was an important precedent in state attempts at nullification of federal law in the years leading up to the American Civil War.

The decision, however, did not stand, as it was then challenged in federal court. It eventually reached the Supreme Court of the United States in the 1859 case of Ableman v. Booth. The Supreme Court overturned the Wisconsin decision and asserted the Supremacy Clause required that state courts could not be allowed to invalidate the decisions of federal courts. Booth was ultimately pardoned by President James Buchanan at the request of United States district judge Andrew G. Miller.

Smith was not renominated for another term on the Court, though he was replaced by ideological ally Byron Paine, who had been the attorney for Sherman Booth.

== Later years ==
He continued to reside in Milwaukee and practiced law until 1861, when, at the outbreak of the American Civil War, he was appointed to the federal revenue service in South Carolina, where he worked until his death.

He became ill in the spring of 1865 and traveled to New York City by steam boat from Hilton Head, South Carolina. He arrived in an exhausted and deteriorating condition and died in New York on June 3, 1865; his remains were returned to Milwaukee for interment.

== Electoral history ==
=== Milwaukee Mayor (1851) ===
1851 Milwaukee mayoral election
Party	Candidate	Votes	%	±%
General Election, May 20, 1851
Independent Democrat	George H. Walker	1,841	55.19%	
Democratic	Abram D. Smith	1,495	44.81%	
Plurality		346	10.37%	
Total votes		3,336	100.0%	
Democratic hold				

=== Wisconsin Supreme Court (1852) ===
1852 Wisconsin Supreme Court election
Party	Candidate	Votes	%	±%
General Election, September 1852
Democratic	Abram D. Smith	10,837	51.00%	
Independent	Marshall Strong	10,410	49.00%	
Plurality		427	2.01%	
Total votes		21,247	100.0%	
Democratic win (new seat)				

Legal offices
Court established by 1852 Wisc. Act 395	Justice of the Wisconsin Supreme Court; 1853 – 1859	Succeeded by Byron Paine
