= John D. McDonald (politician) =

American farmer and politician (1816–1900)

John D. McDonald (August 2, 1816 – October 31, 1900) was an American farmer and politician.

== Early life ==
McDonald was born August 2, 1816, in Johnstown, New York, son of Daniel McDonald (a native of Edinburgh) and Mary Elizabeth Port, a native of Ireland. His mother died when he was five, and his father when he was twelve, leaving John and two siblings as orphans. He became a farm laborer, until at age 16 he became an apprentice in the glove and mitten trade in Gloversville, New York. He left that for Wisconsin Territory in 1836, spending the winter in Milwaukee, and the next year moved to the forty-acre farm in Section 21 of Summit, Waukesha County, where he settled April 7, 1837, and would live for the rest of his life. In 1840 he married Sophia Brown, a native of St. Lawrence County, New York.

== Politics ==
In 1863, McDonald was an unsuccessful candidate for the Wisconsin State Assembly, losing to Union Party candidate Joel R. Carpenter. In 1869 McDonald was elected to the 2nd Waukesha County Assembly district (the Towns of Delafield, Merton, Oconomowoc, Ottawa, Pewaukee, and Summit), usually considered a Republican-leaning district, as a Democrat, with 893 votes to 850 for Republican William M. Jacques (the Republican incumbent, Edwin Hurlbut, was not a candidate). He was assigned to the standing committee on engrossed bills. He was re-elected in 1870, with 922 votes to 858 for Republican Warham Parks. He was assigned to the committee on school lands and university lands. After a redistricting, McDonald's district was split between two new districts, and in 1871 he was not a candidate in either one.

== Later life ==
On April 7, 1887, a gala celebration was held on the McDonald farm (which by then had grown from 40 to several hundred acres) to celebrate the golden anniversary of his settlement in Summit. He and Sophia by this time had had four daughters (three still living) and two sons (both living). McDonald had been chairman of the Summit town board for over a dozen years (equivalent of mayor), been chairman of the county board of supervisors for three or four years, and held various minor local offices.

He died in Summit on October 31, 1900.
