= Ruth Mitchell =

American reporter and Serbian Chetnik

- Ruth Mitchell in 1943
- Born: 1889; Milwaukee, Wisconsin
- Died: 1969 (aged 79–80); Belas, Portugal
- Education: Vassar College
- Occupations: Reporter, author
- Spouse(s): (1) William Van Ryneveld Van Breda (2) Stanley Knowles (3) Benjamin H. Jackson
- Children: John Lendrum Van Breda; Ruth Van Breda
- Relatives: Alexander Mitchell (grandfather); John Lendrum Mitchell (father); Billy Mitchell (brother)
- Writing career
- Years active: c. 1938–1955

Ruth Mitchell (c. 1889–1969) was a reporter who was the only American woman to serve with the Serbian Chetniks under Draža Mihailović in World War II. She was captured by the Gestapo and spent a year as a prisoner of war, later writing a book about her experiences. She also wrote a book about one of her brothers, General Billy Mitchell, who is regarded as the founder of the U.S. Air Force.

== Family and education ==
Ruth Mitchell was born 30 April 1889 in Milwaukee, Wisconsin, the daughter of Harriet Danforth (Becker) Mitchell and John Lendrum Mitchell, who a few years later would become a U.S. congressman and senator. Her grandfather was the wealthy banker and railroad tycoon Alexander Mitchell; her grandmother, Martha Reed Mitchell, was well known in charity, art and society circles. She had two sisters and two brothers: William (known as Billy), who became a general, and John, a World War I aviator who died flying over France in 1917.

She was educated at Milwaukee-Downer College and then at Vassar College.

Mitchell was married three times but always preferred to use her birth name. Her first husband was William Van Ryneveld Van Breda, and with him she had two children: John Lendrum Van Breda (b. 1914) and Ruth Van Breda. John joined the Royal Air Force during World War II and was killed in action in Egypt in May 1941. This marriage was ended by William Van Breda's death.

Mitchell's second husband was Stanley Knowles, a British public school teacher who was stationed in Albania as a diplomat during World War II. They separated in the early 1930s, and in 1943 Mitchell went to Reno, Nevada, to get a divorce.

In May 1944, Mitchell married Benjamin H. Jackson of Idaho, who worked in the mining industry.

Although Mitchell inherited enough money not to have to work, she had an adventurous temperament. An article about her in 1955 described her as one of the "pioneer women airplane pilots," though it is uncertain when or where she learned this skill.

== World War II ==
After the death of her first husband, Mitchell took up photography and writing. In 1938, she was sent to the Balkans by the Illustrated London News as a reporter to cover the marriage of King Zog of Albania. She ended up staying in Europe for four years and was based out of Belgrade, Yugoslavia, when it was bombed and then invaded by Axis powers in April 1941.

Mitchell first became involved with the Chetniks as a reporter and only later joined as a member. It was subsequently reported that Mitchell joined the Comitadji, the Yugoslavian Chetnik guerrilla band led by General Draža Mihailović. Another source states that she initially joined the Chetniks through Mihailović's rival Kosta Pećanac and later shifted her allegiance to Mihailović. Women were rare among the Chetniks, and Mitchell later said that she was accepted only because she could "ride just about anything on four legs" and was ready "to die like a man." Fluent in German, she worked for the Chetniks as a spy and a courier for about a year.

After the German army invaded Yugoslavia in 1941, Mitchell was arrested in the port of Dubrovnik by the Gestapo while mapping German gun emplacement locations for Mihailović. In her book The Serbs Choose War published in 1943, she prophetically described crimes later a subject of the film The Monuments Men, the looting of national cultural treasures in occupied European nations by the Nazis:

Every art gallery and every private home is being picked clean. Everything beautiful, everything valuable to local history as well as to humanity as a whole, is being lugged away to Germany. Will these things ever be recovered? How can it be done?

The United States's neutrality at the time of her arrest prevented her immediate execution. She was held in a dozen German prisons and camps for 13 or 14 months, in the course of which she was tried and sentenced to death. Of this ordeal, she later wrote:

All the women in those prisons expected to die, and I think all the rest of them did. We were starved, tortured and beaten....It taught me the heights of courage to which the human soul can reach.

She escaped execution by being released in 1942 as part of a prisoner of war exchange, through pressure exerted by the Swiss government.

The following year, Mitchell published The Serbs Choose War, an account of her year with Mihailović and the Chetniks and her subsequent life as a German prisoner of war. Here is part of her description of the Nazi bombing of Belgrade on April 6, 1941:

I ran to a smashed window. There in the street among piles of stones men and women lay still in strange, contorted attitudes. I had a surge of uncontrollable wild fury.... There were two unexploded incendiary bombs embedded in the pavement just outside my windows.

== Postwar activities ==
In 1942, Mitchell returned to Milwaukee from overseas. After the war she was actively involved in continuing controversies over the wartime role of the Chetniks.

In 1946, she spoke out against the trial of General Mihailović that was then being held in Belgrade. In part this was personal: one of Mihailović's codefendants, former Belgrade mayor Dragomir Jovanović, had charged her with being seen with the Gestapo. Her response to this was that she had been seen with the Gestapo when she was arrested and court-martialed for her Chetnik activities But she also voiced strong support for Mihailović, calling him "the greatest patriot of the war" and charging that Marshal Tito was claiming credit for his victories and that Tito held power "by using the notorious Croat Ustashe, an organization of murderers trained by Mussolini".

After the war, Mitchell worked on behalf of orphaned Serbian children, fundraising for the charity Serbian War Orphans of World War II.

In 1953 she published My Brother Bill, a book about the general that ranged from his early years to his notorious court-martial.

By 1955 she was living in London, reportedly in a flat where Lord Byron once lived. That same year, she toured the United States promoting the Warner Brothers film The Court-Martial of Billy Mitchell.

== Later life and death ==
In her later years, Mitchell lived in Portugal, where she died in Belas in 1969 following a heart attack.
