= Ezekiel Ricker =

19th century American politician (1819–1854)

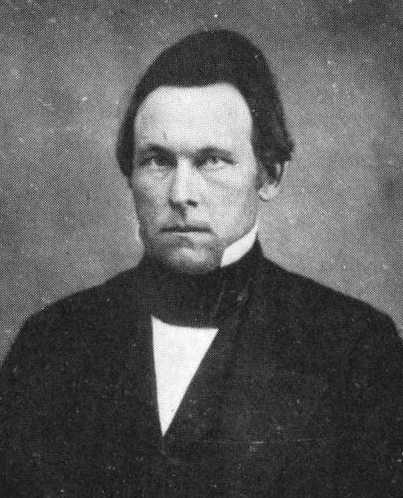
- Portrait from Pioneer Courts and Lawyers of Manitowoc County, Wisconsin (1921)

Member of the Wisconsin State Assembly from the Manitowoc County district
- In office January 5, 1852 – January 2, 1854
- Preceded by: G. C. Oscar Malmros
- Succeeded by: James L. Kyle

County Judge of Manitowoc County, Wisconsin
- In office January 1, 1850 – January 3, 1853
- Preceded by: H. W. Colby
- Succeeded by: George B. Reed

Personal details
- Born: December 3, 1819 Lebanon, Maine, U.S.
- Died: August 10, 1854 (aged 34) Manitowoc, Wisconsin, U.S.
- Cause of death: Cholera
- Resting place: Evergreen Cemetery, Manitowoc
- Party: Democratic
- Spouse: Emelia Melzner (m. 1849–1854)
- Children: Jane Emelia (Harris)^{(b. 1850; died 1932)}; Ida Clarissa (Dumke)^{(b. 1852; died 1909)}; Julia E. (Mosnat)^{(b. 1855; died 1930)}
- Education: Harvard Law School
- Profession: Lawyer

Ezekiel Ricker III (December 3, 1819 – August 10, 1854) was an American lawyer, politician, and Wisconsin pioneer. He was a member of the Wisconsin State Assembly, representing Manitowoc County during the 1852 and 1853 terms. He also served as county judge from 1850 to 1853. He was one of the first lawyers to reside in Manitowoc County, but died at age 34, a victim of the 1846–1860 cholera pandemic.

== Biography ==
Ezekiel Ricker was born in Lebanon, Maine, in 1819. He was raised and educated in Maine, and attended academies at Parsonsfield, Maine, then North Scituate, Rhode Island. In the 1840s, he became a law student in the law office of U.S. representative Nathan Clifford (later an associate justice of the United States Supreme Court). In 1846, Clifford was appointed U.S. attorney general, and Ricker looked to complete his legal training elsewhere. He attended courses at Harvard Law School, and was admitted to the bar.

He immediately moved west to the Wisconsin Territory, and settled at the young village that is now Manitowoc, Wisconsin. Ricker was either the first or second lawyer in Manitowoc (the other early lawyer being James L. Kyle). In the first county elections after the organization of the county government in 1848, Ricker was elected county clerk of the circuit court. The following year, in September 1849, Ricker was elected county judge, defeating the incumbent judge H. W. Colby. He was subsequently re-elected two times, serving until January 1853.

While serving as county judge, he was also elected to represent Manitowoc County in the Wisconsin State Assembly during the 1852 and 1853 terms, running on the Democratic Party ticket.

In the summer of 1854, the 1846–1860 cholera pandemic reached Manitowoc County, Wisconsin. Ricker contracted the infection and died on August 10, 1854.

== Personal life and family ==
Ezekiel Ricker was one of at least 9 children born to Ezekiel Ricker II and his wife Nancy (née Coffin). His paternal grandfather, Ezekiel Ricker I, served as a private in the Massachusetts militia during the American Revolutionary War. The Rickers were descendants of Maturin Ricker, who emigrated from England to the Province of New Hampshire about 1670.

Ezekiel Ricker III married Emelia Melzner on Christmas Day 1849, in Manitowoc. Melzner was a Wisconsin-born daughter of German immigrants. They had three daughters together, who all survived them.

Wisconsin State Assembly
Preceded by G. C. Oscar Malmros	Member of the Wisconsin State Assembly from the Manitowoc County district January 5, 1852 – January 2, 1854	Succeeded by James L. Kyle
Legal offices
Preceded by H. W. Colby	County Judge of Manitowoc County, Wisconsin; January 1850 – January 1854	Succeeded by George B. Reed
