= Curtis Mann =

American politician

Curtis Mann (June 22, 1815 - February 27, 1894) was an American politician and businessman.

Born in the town of Hartford, New York, Mann worked in the grain trade business in addition to the lake and canal transportation business in Buffalo, New York. In 1856, he moved to the town of Summit, Wisconsin. Mann began his political career as a member of the Milwaukee Board of Trade. In 1868 and 1869, Mann served in the Wisconsin State Senate. In 1887, he moved to Oconomowoc, Wisconsin, where he resided for the rest of his life.
