= Joseph Vilas =

19th century American businessman and politician

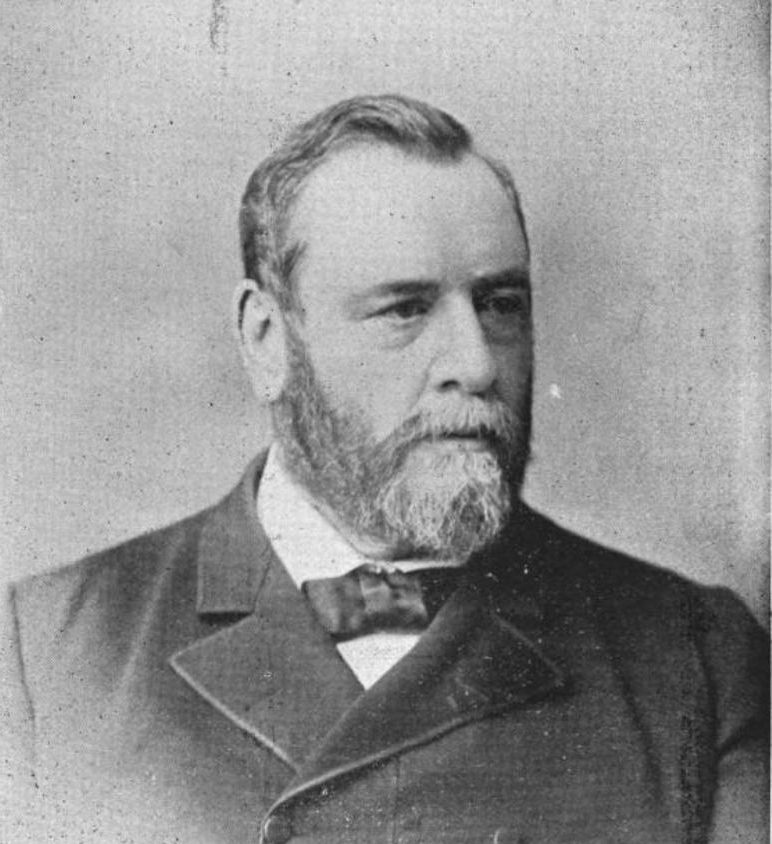

10th Mayor of Manitowoc, Wisconsin
- In office April 1893 – April 1895
- Preceded by: Fred Schuette
- Succeeded by: Thomas Torrison

Member of the Wisconsin Senate from the 19th district
- In office January 1, 1863 – January 1, 1865
- Preceded by: George A. Jenkins
- Succeeded by: George B. Reed

Personal details
- Born: Joseph Vilas; March 31, 1832 Ogdensburg, New York, U.S.
- Died: January 7, 1905 (aged 72) Manitowoc, Wisconsin
- Resting place: Evergreen Cemetery; Manitowoc, Wisconsin
- Party: Democratic
- Spouses: Mary Platt; (died 1901)
- Relations: William Freeman Vilas (cousin)
- Children: Joseph Stilwell Vilas^{(b. 1858; died 1921)}

Joseph Vilas (March 31, 1832 – January 7, 1905) was an American businessman and politician. He was the 10th Mayor of Manitowoc, Wisconsin.

== Biography ==
Born in Ogdensburg, New York, Vilas went to Union College in Schenectady, New York. In 1852, he moved to Manitowoc, Wisconsin. He was involved with the mercantile, railroad, and paper manufacturing businesses. During the American Civil War, Vilas served as a draft commissioner. He served in the Wisconsin State Senate in 1863 and 1864 and was a Democrat. He also served as president of the village of Manitowoc. In 1893, he was elected mayor of Manitowoc. Vilas was president of the Board of Harbor Commissioners. In 1868, he ran for election to the United States House of Representatives and lost the election to Philetus Sawyer. Vilas died by suicide with a firearm in his home in Manitowoc. He had been in ill health for several years. He was a cousin of William Freeman Vilas.
