= Martha Reed Mitchell =

American philanthropist

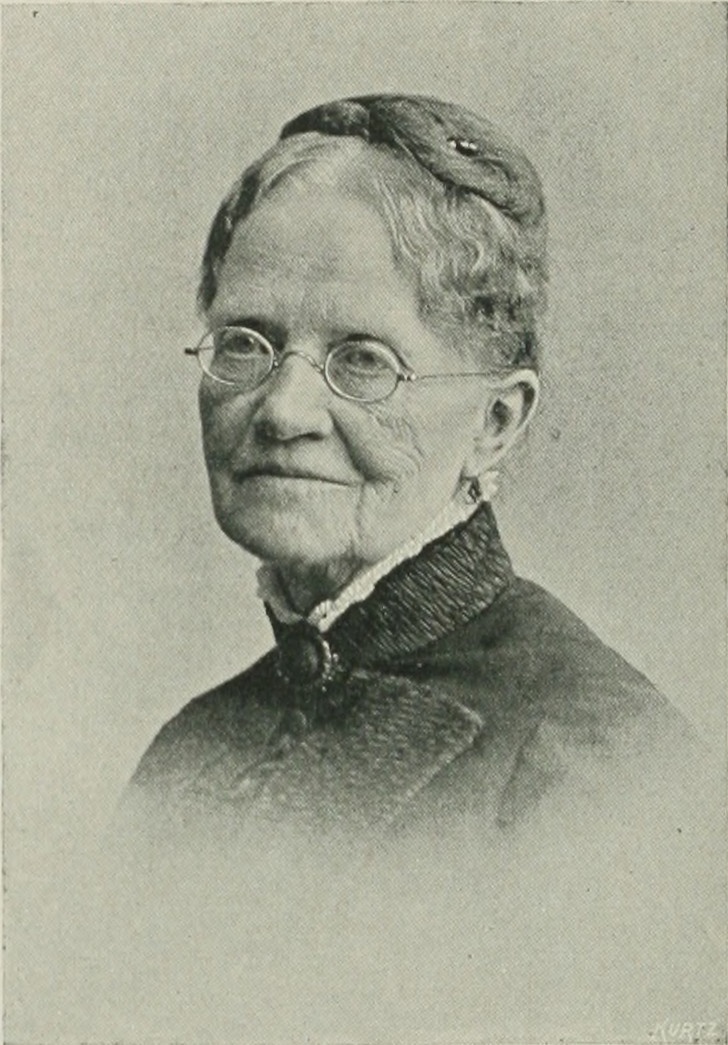
- "A Woman of the Century"
- Born: Martha Reed; March 1818; Westford, Massachusetts, U.S.
- Died: February 15, 1902 (aged 83); Jacksonville, Florida, U.S.
- Education: Miss Catherine Fiske's Young Ladies Seminary; Emma Willard School
- Occupations: philanthropist; socialite
- Spouse: Alexander Mitchell (m. 1841; died 1887)
- Children: John L. Mitchell
- Relatives: George B. Reed (brother); Orson Reed (brother); Harrison Reed (brother); Curtis Reed (brother); Abram D. Smith (brother-in-law); Chloe Merrick Reed (sister-in-law); Billy Mitchell (grandson); Ruth Mitchell (granddaughter)

Martha Reed Mitchell (March 1818 – February 15, 1902) was an American philanthropist and socialite, well known in charity, art and society circles in the U.S. and abroad. In 1841, she married Alexander Mitchell, one of the sturdy pioneers of Wisconsin, and later, one of the most prominent men in the state. While her husband amassed great wealth, neither prosperity nor popularity deprived Mrs. Mitchell of her simple manner and her love and interest in the cause of the less fortunate. She organized the Protestant Orphan Asylum of Milwaukee, and served as its first treasurer. She supported a mission kindergarten, with nearly 100 children.. Art and artists were indebted to Mitchell for her liberal patronage. After the civil war, she established a winter home near Jacksonville, Florida, where she brought to great perfection tropical fruit-bearing trees, and many rare plantings, including those from Ceylon, China, and India. While here, she became interested in the charities of Florida. She was one of the first Vice-Regents of the Mount Vernon Ladies' Association.

== Early life and education ==
Martha Reed was born in Westford, Massachusetts, in March 1818. Her parents were Seth and Rhoda Reed. She was one of a large family, and in early years learned the lessons of unselfishness and thoughtfulness of others, characteristics that in a marked degree remained prominent through her life. Her siblings included brothers, Harrison Reed, Curtis Reed, and George Reed.

At the age of 13, she attended Miss Catherine Fiske's Young Ladies Seminary in Keene, New Hampshire, and at 17, went to Emma Willard School in Troy, New York, where the happiest days of her life were passed.

In 1838, she was forced to renounce a tempting offer of a trip to Europe, and to leave her beloved companions, to go with her parents to the wilds of the Wisconsin Territory. No vestibuled trains in those days transported passengers across the continent. Instead of hours, weeks were necessary for such a journey. Through the Erie Canal and by the chain of Great Lakes the family wended their way, and after three weeks of anxiety and trouble, they touched the shores of Wisconsin at Milwaukee, their objective point, a village of 500 people. Forests covered the area. Native Americans tribes whose homeland was in Wisconsin lived with in wigwams.

== Career ==
=== Wisconsin ===
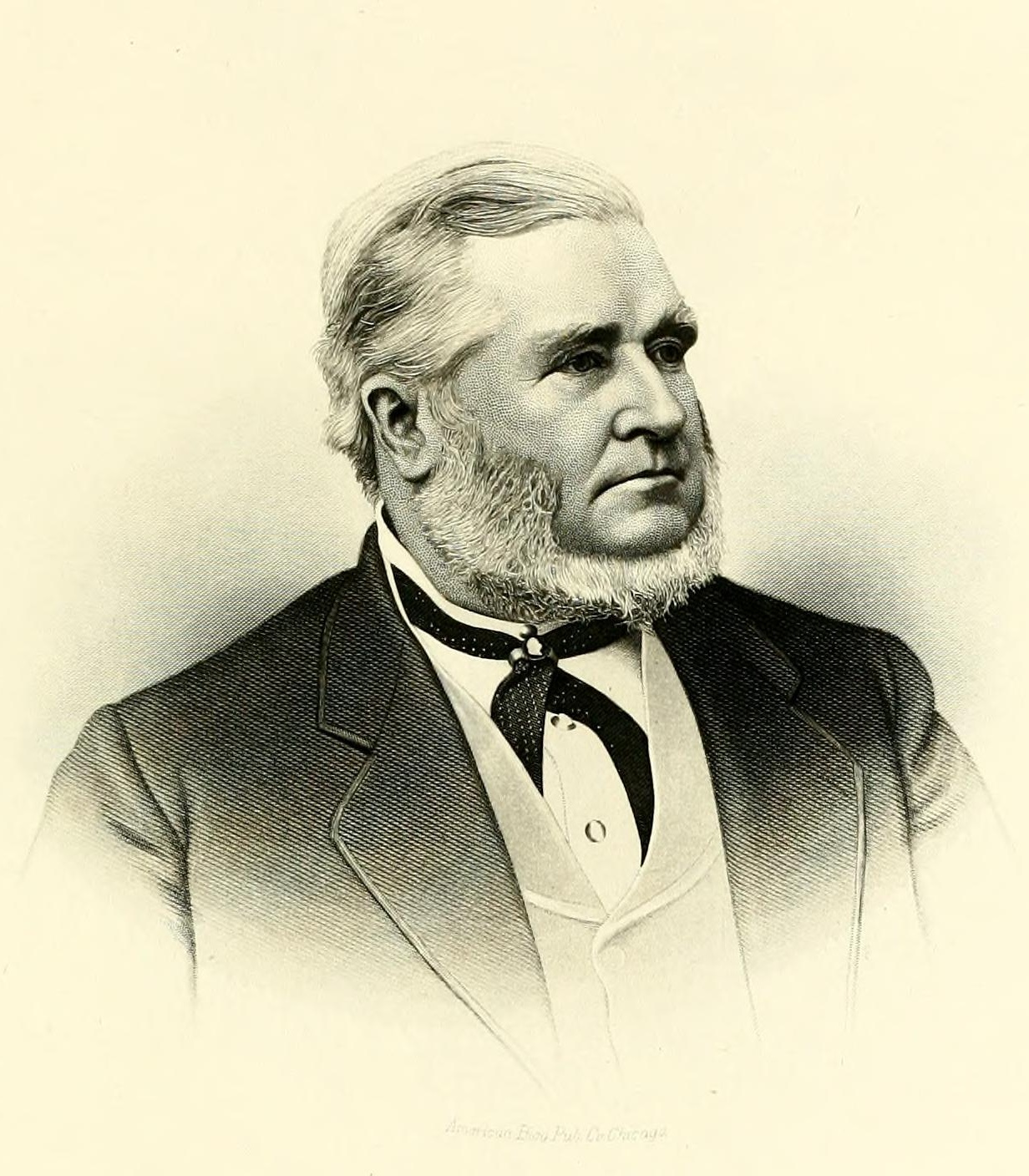
Alexander Mitchell (Wisconsin Congressman).jpg

In 1841, Martha married Alexander Mitchell, a young Scotsman who had left his country to seek his fortune in the U.S. The young couple began housekeeping in a tiny one-storied cottage. While he milked the cow and attended to the horse and outdoor work, she did the housework. Both said that the first year of their married life, was the ideal one. With keen foresight, he grasped the opportunities that others did not see, and she entered into all projects for benefiting the poor, assisting in founding churches, hospitals and asylums. Ever sympathetic with the sufferings of others, especially of young children, she, with a few earnest women, early in the 1840s organized what became known as the Protestant Orphan Asylum. Mitchell was its first treasurer.

In 1858, Mitchell was elected Vice-Regent of the Mount Vernon Ladies' Association for Wisconsin.

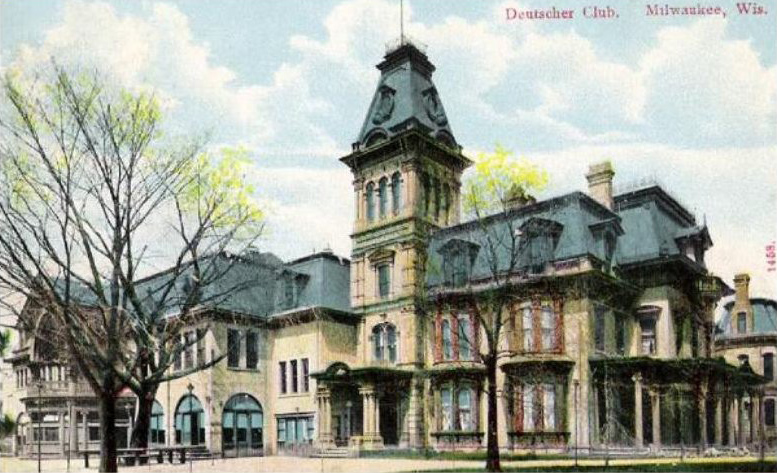
Mitchell mansion, Milwaukee

As the years passed, the couple became wealthy.

In art circles, she was prominent for many years, encouraging a love for it at home by supporting schools and giving exhibits of works imported from Europe entirely at her expense, so that in all the studios of Italy and France, as well as in the U.S., her name was synonymous with art. Where real talent was apparent in a struggling artist, encouragement by appreciation as well as pecuniary aid was extended by her.

For years, after leaving Milwaukee, she supported a mission kindergarten, where, daily, nearly 100 children from the poorest parts of society were taught to be self-respecting and self-sustaining men and women.

The rigorous climate of the Great Lake region being detrimental to her health as she aged, Mitchell opted to travel. She crossed the Atlantic Ocean many times, visiting England, Ireland, Scotland, France, Germany, Switzerland, Italy and Egypt. She also traveled in the U.S., Mexico City, Cuba, and the Bahamian island of New Providence.

=== Florida ===
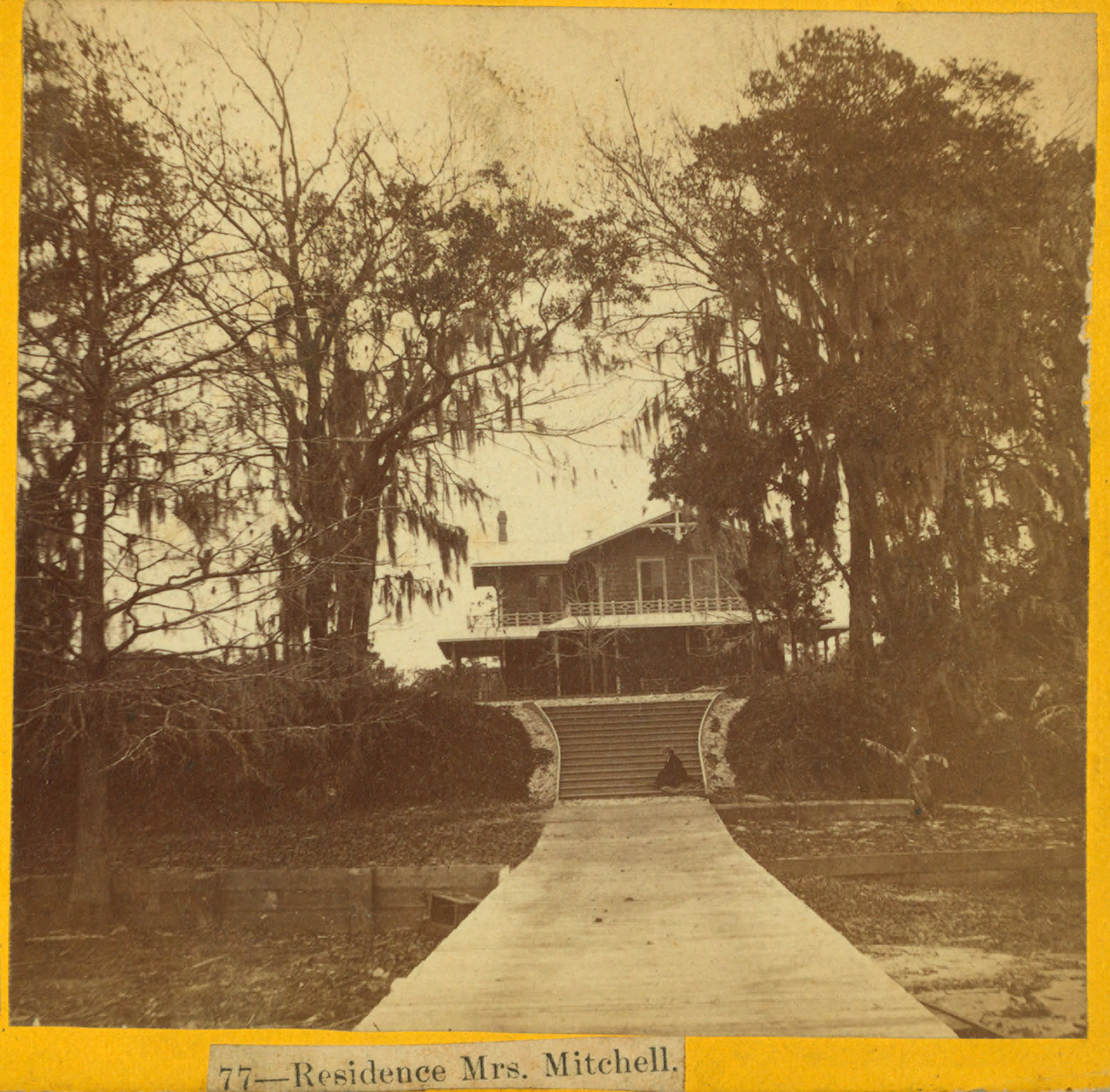
Villa Alexandria, Jacksonville, Florida

Soon after the Civil War, while visiting Florida, she found a location where health and the pleasures of a home could be combined. A tract of land was purchased on the St. Johns River 3 miles (4.8 km) from Jacksonville, Florida. In an area now known as the San Marco neighborhood of Jacksonville, they established the vast estate of Alexandria as a winter home. With her will and energy, aided by ample means, Mitchell in a few years, converted a sandy area into "a thing of beauty and a joy forever." She brought to perfection the orange, lemon, banana, olive, plum, pear, peach, and apricot, the English walnut, the pecan from Brazil, and the Spanish chestnut. Among her rare trees were the camphor and cinnamon from Ceylon and the tea plant from China. Her list of bamboos includes the sacred tree of India and five varieties of cane. The family of flowers embraced all the well-known varieties of the temperate zone and the tropics. Her home was well maintained and frequently used for hosting guests.

Prominent among her charities in Florida was St. Luke's Hospital, managed by an association of women, of whom Mitchell was the inspiration and head.

After the death of her husband, April 19, 1887, Mitchell left Milwaukee and located her summer home on the St. Lawrence River, in the vicinity of the Thousand Islands. There she lived during the months of July and August.

In 1888, Mitchell made a permanent move to her Villa Alexandria estate in Florida with her grandson, David.

As the years passed, she became increasingly characterized as of "unsound mind".

== Death and legacy ==
Martha Reed Mitchell died at her home, Villa Alexandria, near Jacksonville, Florida, February 15, 1902, aged 84 years.

Her papers are held by the Fred W. Smith National Library for the Study of George Washington.
