= Harrison Reed (politician) =

9th Governor of Florida

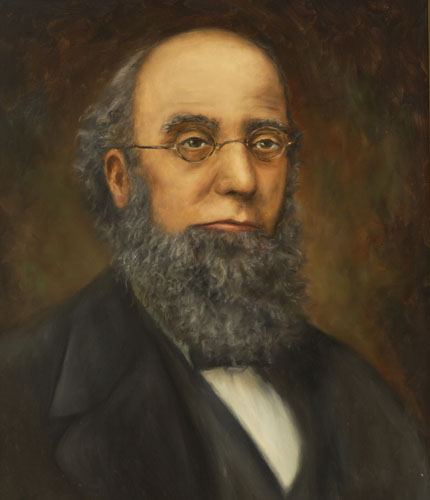

9th Governor of Florida
- In office July 4, 1868 – January 7, 1873
- Lieutenant: William Henry Gleason; Edmund C. Weeks; Samuel T. Day
- Preceded by: David S. Walker
- Succeeded by: Ossian B. Hart

Personal details
- Born: August 26, 1813 Littleton, Massachusetts, U.S.
- Died: May 25, 1899 (aged 85) Jacksonville, Florida, U.S.
- Party: Republican
- Spouse(s): Amanda Turner; Chloe Merrick
- Relatives: George B. Reed (brother); Orson Reed (brother); Curtis Reed (brother); Martha Reed Mitchell (sister); Abram D. Smith (brother-in-law); Alexander Mitchell (brother-in-law); John L. Mitchell (nephew)

Harrison Jackson Reed (August 26, 1813 – May 25, 1899) was an American editor and politician who had most of his political career in Florida. He was elected in 1868 as the ninth governor of Florida, serving until 1873 during the Reconstruction era. Born in Littleton, Massachusetts, he moved as a youth with his family to Milwaukee, Wisconsin, where he had a grocery store and started farming. He also owned and edited the Milwaukee Sentinel for several years.

Reed became active in the Republican Party and in 1861 he began his political career, moving to Washington, DC, for a patronage job in the Treasury Department. In 1863 he was appointed as the tax commissioner of Florida, to oversee confiscation and sales of Confederate properties in Union-occupied areas. In 1865, he was appointed as postal agent for the state. In 1868, he was elected as governor under the new constitution, which enfranchised freedmen. He served one term, with challenges by factions of the Republican Party resulting in two attempts in the state senate at impeachment. He strongly supported public education, where the growth in new schools served one-quarter of the children by 1872.

== Early life and education ==
Harrison was one of eight Reed children, born on August 26, 1813, in Littleton, Massachusetts, to parents Seth Reed (1781–1848) and Rhoda (Finney) Reed (1781–1874). The Reed family moved to Milwaukee, Wisconsin, in 1836, where his siblings contributed to the newly developing areas and two brothers became politicians. His brothers were Herbert Reed, who became a grocer in Milwaukee and married Phebe Adeline Brisbane; Orson Reed of Summit, Wisconsin, who married Agnes Fairservice; Curtis Reed, who served as a state legislator; and George B. Reed, who became a judge and politician in Wisconsin. His sisters married substantial men: Mary Augusta Reed (1811–1866) married Judge Abram Daniel Smith (1811-1865); Martha (1817–1902) married Alexander Mitchell (1817–1887), who became a banker and railroad tycoon; and Julia Ann married Dr. Thomas J. Noyes, who became the first president of the Milwaukee Academy of Medicine.

At age 16, Harrison had been apprenticed to a printer, but health problems caused him to quit. When his family moved to Milwaukee, Wisconsin, he became a merchant there, opening the first general store. He also started the first Sunday school. After his business failed in the Panic of 1837, he took a turn at farming.

He also became an early owner and editor of the Milwaukee Sentinel in the city, publishing it from December 1837 until May 1842. He co-published the Wisconsin State Journal in Madison with David Atwood from 1859 to 1861.

On August 12, 1841, he married Amanda Anna Louisa Turner in Milwaukee. Together, they helped settle the towns of Neenah and Menasha. They had four children, one of whom died before the age of two.

== Politics and moves ==
After joining the Republican Party in 1861, Reed moved to Washington, D.C., for a job that he had obtained at the Treasury Department. While they were living in Washington, his wife Amanda died on October 13, 1862.

In 1863, Reed was appointed by President Abraham Lincoln to be the tax commissioner in Florida to deal with sales and disposition of confiscated Confederate property. While working as tax commissioner, Reed traveled to Fernandina Beach on Amelia Island, which was occupied by Union forces, to oversee use of Confederate properties. There he met Chloe Merrick, who was teaching freedmen children, and was working to set up an orphanage. The widower was very impressed with Merrick, a young teacher from Syracuse, New York.

In 1869, Reed encountered Chloe Merrick again, who had moved to North Carolina for her health and was again teaching freed children. He proposed marriage to her. They were married at the home of Merrick's sister and brother-in-law in Syracuse, New York, on August 10, 1869. They had a son Harrison, Jr. together.

In 1865, President Andrew Johnson appointed Reed as the postal agent for Florida. He continued to be involved with postwar development in the state.

During the Reconstruction era, in 1868 Florida enacted a new constitution, which extended citizenship and voting rights to freedmen. Most joined the Republican Party, which had emancipated them. Reed was elected governor under the new constitution. In the election, Reed received 14,421 votes and his Democratic Party opponent (George Washington Scott) received 7,731 votes. Reed assumed office on June 8, 1868. The results were disputed by the Democrats. It was not until July 4, 1868, that the federal commander of military forces in Florida for Reconstruction, General George Gordon Meade, recognized the constitution and the election as valid. Florida was readmitted to the Union at that time. Although the military forces in Florida were to leave on July 4, 1868 (following the restoration to the Union), Reed requested the continuation of Union forces.

Reed appointed Jonathan Clarkson Gibbs as Florida's first African-American Secretary of State, and also commissioned Gibbs as a lieutenant colonel in the Florida State Militia. He had a tumultuous tenure, with opposition from factions of the Republican Party. They made two attempts to pass impeachment resolutions in the state Senate against him.

In the first effort, the state Senate voted for his impeachment in November 1868, and William Henry Gleason, his lieutenant governor from 1868 to 1870, proclaimed himself as Governor. The state adjutant general and the sheriff of Leon County, Alvin B. Munger, a former US Army officer, supported Reed and organized an effort to deny Gleason access to the Capitol. On November 24, 1868, the Florida Supreme Court held that the Senate had lacked a quorum at their vote and could not have impeached Reed. Gleason was forced out.

During the Senate's second attempt to impeach Reed, Lieutenant Governor Samuel T. Day claimed to be acting governor from February 10 to May 4, 1872, while the senate was conducting hearings and voting. While his impeachment was pending, Reed had felt he was disqualified from holding office, and left the capital. The Legislature adjourned without bringing him to trial, which he construed as equivalent to acquittal. While Day was in Jacksonville for a party caucus, Reed returned to Tallahassee, declared himself governor, and appointed a new attorney general. Reed's proclamation was approved by the secretary of state and upheld by the state Supreme Court.

Reed served as governor until January 7, 1873. He is believed to have been influenced by his wife's interest in education and alleviating poverty. After their marriage, he supported founding a state university, and gave strong support to public education. It was established for the first time in the state by the Reconstruction legislature. From 1870 to 1872, the number of public schools in the state increased from 270 to 444, and the number of children served grew from 7500 to 16,258, roughly one-quarter of the population of student age.

After holding office, Reed acquired a farm south of Jacksonville, along the St. Johns River. He returned to journalism, editing a local magazine, The Semi-Tropical. Although he struggled financially, he and Chloe Merrick Reed were active in civic affairs. In 1889 Reed was appointed as US postmaster of Tallahassee by President Benjamin Harrison, serving for the remainder of his administration. Reed's final public service was to represent Duval County in Florida's House of Representatives until his death in Jacksonville on May 25, 1899. He was buried there in the Oaklawn Cemetery.

== Honors ==
Reed Street in Jacksonville, Florida is named for him.

Party political offices
| First | Republican nominee for Governor of Florida; 1868 | Succeeded by Ossian B. Hart |
Political offices
| Preceded by David S. Walker | Governor of Florida; 1868–1873 | Succeeded by Ossian B. Hart |
