= 2nd Florida Cavalry Regiment (Union) =

- Active: December 1863 – November 29, 1865
- Disbanded: November 29, 1865
- Country: United States
- Allegiance: Union
- Branch: Cavalry
- Size: Regiment
- Engagements: American Civil War

The 2nd Florida Cavalry Regiment was a Cavalry regiment from Florida that served in the Union Army between December 1863 and November 29, 1865, during the American Civil War.

== Service ==
Organized at Cedar Key and Key West, Florida between December 1863 and June 1864. During the summer of 1864, while the regiment was stationed at Fort Myers, many refugees in the town enlisted with the unit. A field commander visiting Fort Myers said of the regiment: "Cavalry they were called, and as cavalry they were paid, but they never were mounted." The unit was then attached to District of Key West and Tortugas, Department of the Gulf and the Department of Florida to November 1865. The unit was led by Maj. Edmund C. Weeks.

SERVICE – Duty at Fort Myers, Cedar Key and in District of Key West till June, 1865. Skirmishes at Pease Creek, Florida, February 13–14 and February 20, 1864. Attack on Fort Myers February 20. Affair at Tampa May 6. Operations on West Coast of Florida July 1–31. Expedition to Bayport, Florida July 1–4. Skirmishes at Station Four, near Cedar Key, July 6. Expedition to St. Andrews Bay July 20–29. Fort Myers August 26. Expedition to Bayport October 1, and to St. Andrews Bay October 20–29. Near Magnolia October 24. Expedition to Otter Creek, on Florida Railroad, October 30–31. [Braddock's Farm, near Welaka, Florida, February 5, 1865. Note: Dyer's "A Compendium of the War of the Rebellion" is incorrect here. Fredrick Dyer mistook 2nd Florida Cavalry C.S.for this Unit. 2nd Florida Cavalry U.S. was not involved with the 17th Connecticut Volunteer Infantry in this Affair.] Station Four, near Cedar Key, February 13. Attack on Fort Myers February 20. Operations near St. Marks, Florida February 21 – March 7. East River Bridge March 4–5. Newport Bridge March 5–6. Natural Bridge (in Leon County, Florida) March 6. Occupation of Tampa May 27. Duty in District of Florida till November. Mustered out on November 29, 1865.

During the raid on Station Four in early February 1865, the unit fought along infantry from the 2nd United States Colored Infantry Regiment.

== See also ==
- List of Florida Union Civil War units

== Bibliography ==
- Dyer, Frederick H. (1959). A Compendium of the War of the Rebellion. New York and London. Thomas Yoseloff, Publisher. LCCN 59-12963.
