= Wisconsin Central Railroad (1871–1899) =

Defunct American railway (1871–1897)

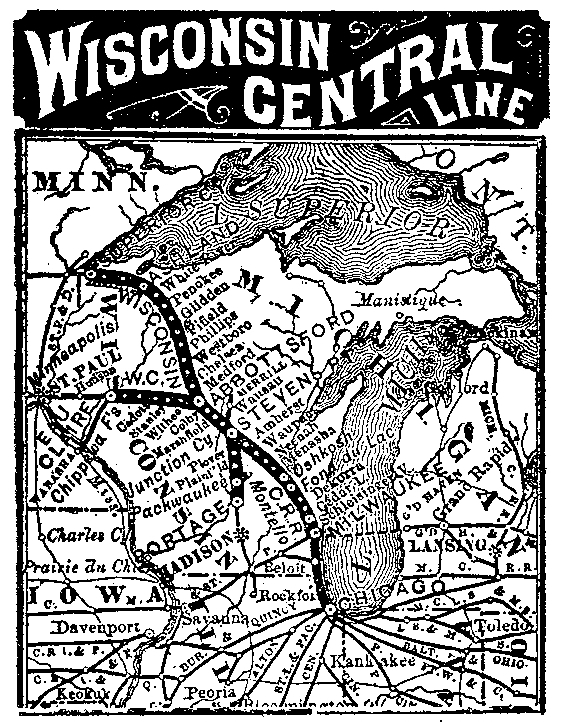

Overview
- Locale: Wisconsin, Minnesota, Illinois
- Dates of operation: 1871–1899
- Successor: Wisconsin Central Railway

Technical
- Track gauge: 4 ft 8 1/2 in (1,435 mm) standard gauge

The original Wisconsin Central Railroad Company was a major early railroad that operated throughout northern Wisconsin. It built lines up through the forested wilderness, and opened large tracts to logging and settlement. It established stations which would grow into a string of cities and towns between Stevens Point and Ashland, including Marshfield and Medford, and it connected these places to Chicago and St. Paul. It also played a major role in building Chicago's Grand Central Station.

Despite these successes, it struggled financially from the start and was bankrupt by 1879. It was leased to the Northern Pacific Railway from 1889 to 1893, and was finally reorganized from bankruptcy in 1897 as the Wisconsin Central Railway.

== Background ==
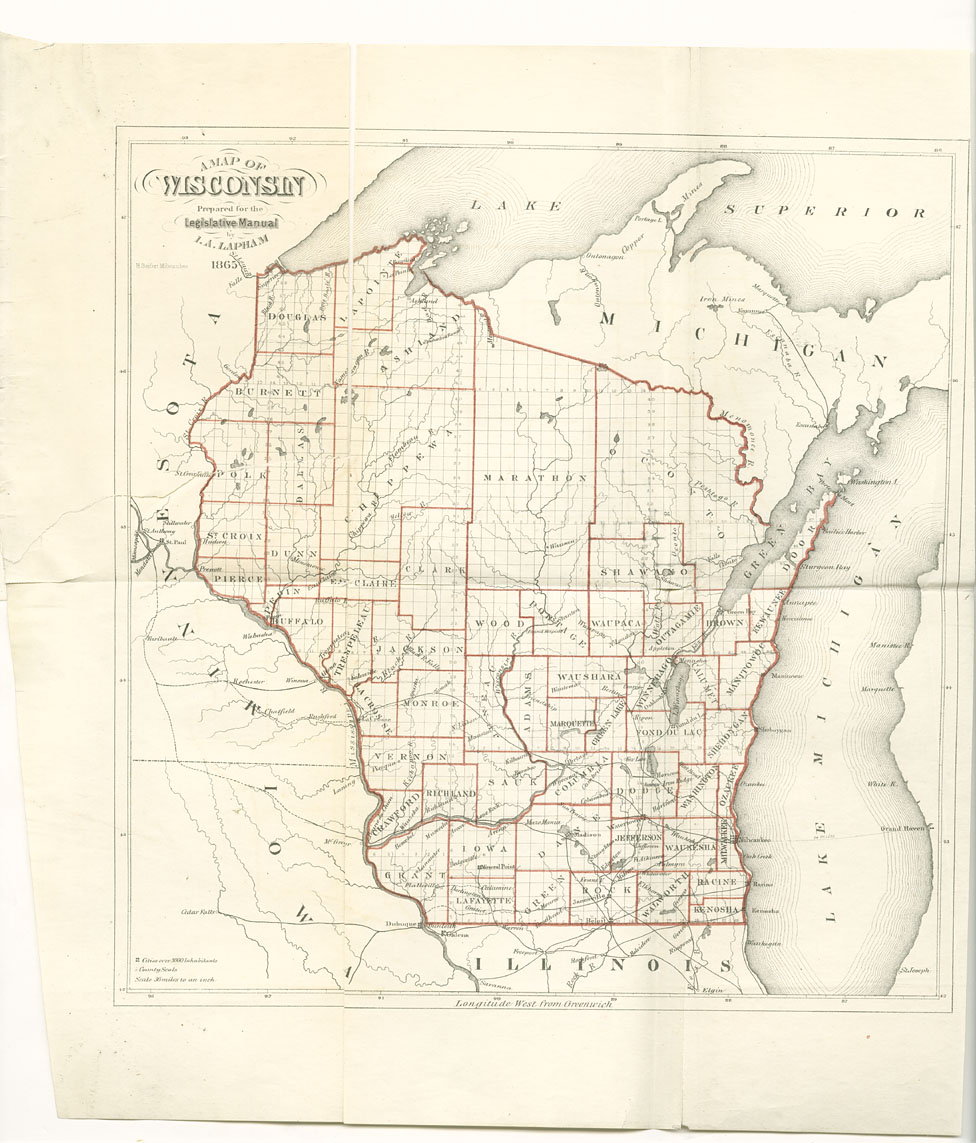
1865 map of Wisconsin

By the time of the Civil War, the southern half of Wisconsin was somewhat settled. Much of the north, however, remained wilderness, including swaths of virgin timber and deposits of iron ore. Treaties with Native Americans had placed most of this land in the hands of the federal government. Logging of the white pine had begun along the rivers, where the product could be floated out, but some stretches of timber stood far from large enough streams for river-logging. One such stretch lay between the Chippewa and Wisconsin Rivers.

At that time, U.S. relations with Great Britain were complicated. Britain was officially neutral during the Civil War, but many of the British elites sympathized with the Confederacy. This was only 50 years after the War of 1812, in which Britain had captured Prairie du Chien, among other indignities. It was also less than 100 years after the American Revolution. The British Province of Canada lay just across Lake Superior, and the War Department wanted the ability to move troops and supplies to the border. Toward that end, the government cut military wagon roads through the northern forest. These were financed in part by land grants, where the government gave the road-builders timber and land close to the roads. However, these stump-choked wagon roads would have transported war materials very slowly, so in 1864 the U.S. Congress offered similar land grants to encourage several proposed railroad-building projects from Portage up through the center of the state to Superior. Generally, if a railroad was built of adequate quality, its company received half the land and timber for ten miles on either side of the segments built - the odd-numbered sections.

Two companies were established in 1866 to take advantage of Congress's offered land grants. The first corporation, the Winnebago and Lake Superior Railroad Company, was chartered to build from Menasha, the manufacturing center on Lake Winnebago, north to Stevens Point, and then onward to Superior. This railroad eventually was headed by Judge George Reed of Manitowoc. The second corporation, the Portage and Superior Railroad Company, intended to build from the city of Portage north to Stevens Point, also to Superior. The two railroads were consolidated in 1869 to become the Portage, Winnebago, and Superior Railroad Company, and this railroad's name was changed to the Wisconsin Central Railroad Company in 1871. The Manitowoc and Minnesota Railroad, which Reed also headed, was consolidated into the Wisconsin Central in July 1871. None of these early railroad companies laid track, but their mergers provided corporate structure to move forward.

As corporate consolidation proceeded, Reed planned to build the first leg of the Wisconsin Central from Menasha to Stevens Point. Reed's colleagues included Menasha civic leader (and his brother) Curtis Reed and Matt Wadleigh, a lumber man from Stevens Point. They had the right to the land grant, but it paid only after track was built, so they needed money to get the project rolling. Judge Reed went east looking for financing.

Gardner Colby of Boston had worked his way up from store clerk to store owner to importer, then bought a textile mill and made his fortune selling clothing to the Union Army during the Civil War. Interested in Wisconsin timber and iron ore, he could arrange the financing that Judge Reed's group needed. However, Colby did not know anything about building a railroad, so he brought in Elijah B. Phillips, president of the Lake Shore and Northern Indiana Railway.

With financial backing secured, Judge Reed went back to Wisconsin to lay more groundwork. He had a civil engineer plan and estimate the first portion of the proposed railroad. That stretch from Menasha to Stevens Point was already somewhat settled, and Reed traveled up and down it raising support from the young towns that stood to profit from a rail connection. The arrangement with Colby was that locally raised money would buy the right of way, clear and grade it, put in culverts and bridges, and provide ties. Then, Colby and his associates would provide the rails, stations, and all the equipment to run a railroad. Reed persuaded Menasha, Neenah, and Waupaca to each give $50,000 to the project, Stevens Point $30,000, Ashland $20,000, and other towns smaller amounts.

== Building the line north ==
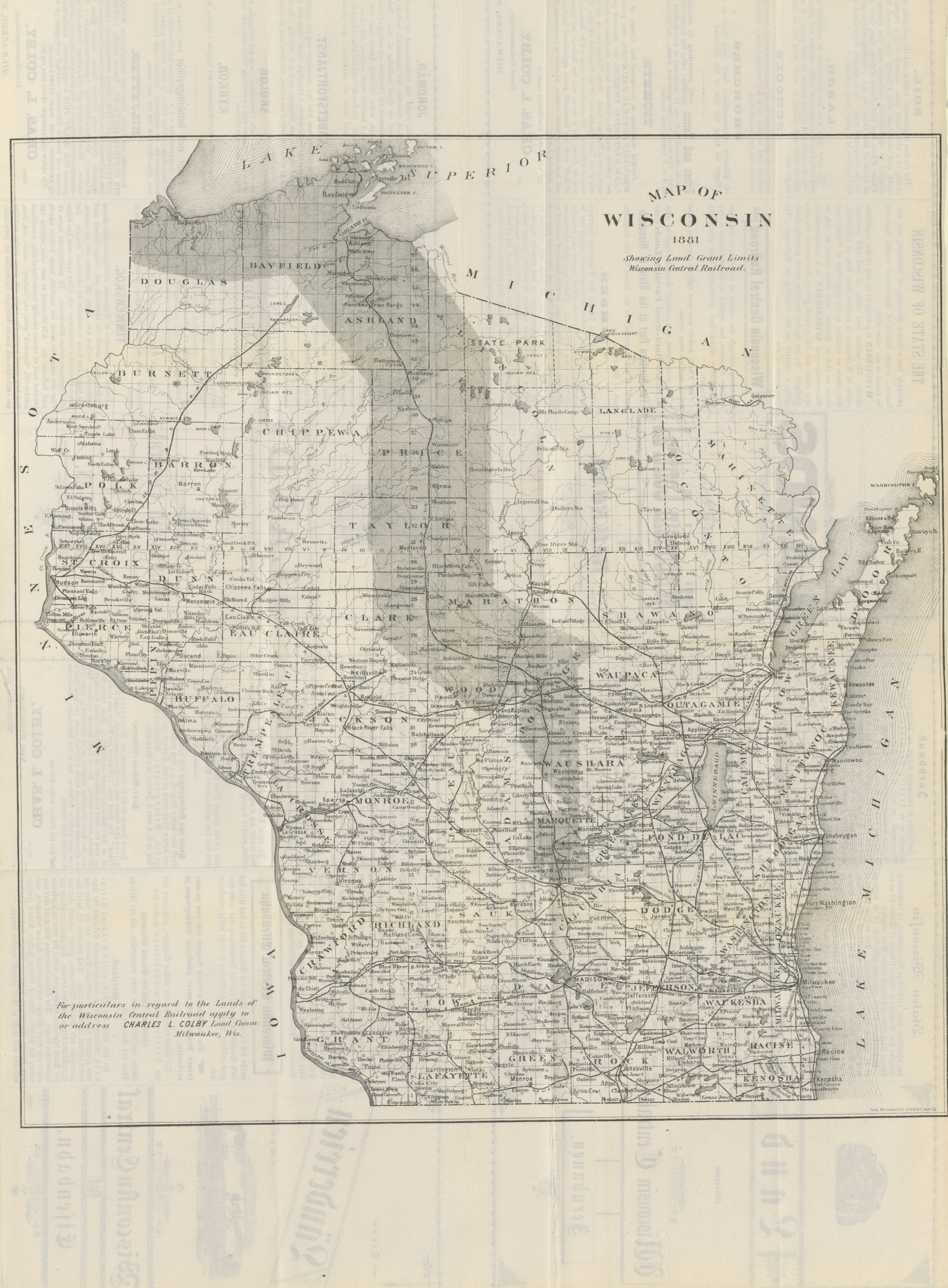
Wisconsin Central Railroad lands in 1881

Construction began June 15, 1871 in West Menasha. Reuben Scott of Menasha oversaw this first 63-mile leg to Stevens Point. Two subcontractors cleared and graded the roadbed, employing as many as 2,000 men, 600 horses, and 100 yoke of oxen. Other contractors built bridges, culverts, and trestles. The largest such project was the 200-foot bridge across the Wolf River at Gills Landing, with a half mile of trestle approaches. The road bed was formed 16 feet wide at the top, with nine-foot hand-hewn cross ties. Then the iron rails were laid. Given equipment at that time, they made remarkable progress, averaging a mile per day. By October, two trains were running daily to Waupaca, and the first train steamed into Stevens Point on November 15, an occasion for celebration there. Governor Taylor and other dignitaries rode the new railroad late in the year and were impressed with its smoothness.

The second construction season in 1872 also went well, though it was a different operation. Beyond Stevens Point, the route passed through a wilderness of forests and swamps, with occasional camps of Native Americans, timber cruisers, and pioneer settlers. This time, the Hooper, Boyle and Seymour Construction Company organized the road-building work, beginning March 18. At the Wisconsin River just west of Stevens Point, a bridge-building contractor constructed a three-span Howe truss railroad bridge. The railroad also established its operating headquarters in Stevens Point, building a six-stall roundhouse and shops there. By September, the rails had reached 51 miles northwest of Stevens Point, to a place initially called "Section 53". Shortly, they named the station Colby, in honor of Gardner Colby's son Charles, a director of the Wisconsin Central and a partner in the Phillips and Colby Construction Company. Beyond Colby, they had cleared the roadbed to "Mile Post 101", which would later be renamed Worcester, just south of modern Phillips.

In April of the same year, construction began south from Ashland. The railroad had originally planned for Bayfield, an existing town, to be the terminal on Lake Superior, but then decided Ashland was more suitable. In 1870, when the railroad's civil engineer surveyed Ashland, its population was five. With news of the railroad's plans, businesses poured in. The Bayfield Press described it as "the Future Iron City of Lake Superior". In 1872, the Wisconsin Central built its dock at Ashland. The general contractor on this stretch was Stoughton Brothers of Winona and supplies had to be shipped in through the Soo Locks to the new dock in Ashland, then up the track as it was built. By late 1872, over a thousand men were working on this northern segment. Progress was slow, and by winter the line had progressed only six miles, to White River where the contractors and the Chicago Bridge Company built a bridge 1,600 feet long and 110 feet above the water in the ravine below.

Things would soon come to a halt. One December morning, word came to stop all work on the northern section of the railroad. The Wisconsin Central was short on funds. Captain Rich was in charge of this northern division of the railroad and his orders were to pay off the workers and help transport anyone who wanted to leave. Lake Superior was freezing over so boats weren't running, there were no railroads or highways out of Ashland, so the only way out for these men was to walk 80 miles of trails to Superior. The 1,000 men who were there were not happy about the situation. After some days, when Rich, the pay-master, and guards arrived at a place called Kelly's camp to settle up, the workers demanded pay up to that day, instead of the day work was stopped. When Rich refused, the men tried to take the money. Rich pulled his revolver to hold the men back. Then, he and his men jumped into their wagon and fled for Ashland, with angry workers in pursuit. Ashland shut down its saloons as the workers arrived to try to keep things under control. The city ended up calling in the Bayfield militia, which marched across the bay on the ice and put Ashland under martial law for ten days. The workers were soon paid and the militia escorted over 1,000 men out of Ashland to walk the 80 miles to Superior in January. This episode came to be called the "Ashland War".

At the southern construction camp, the year did not end much better. When work was suspended, the workers waited in the camp at Colby two weeks without pay. Finally, 900 frustrated men commandeered a train and rode it down to Stevens Point, where they smeared tar on the Wisconsin Central's new bridge across the Wisconsin River, and threatened to burn it if they weren't paid. The railroad soon complied and paid the workers.

By next spring, in early 1873, the railroad had scraped together enough money to resume construction. That year, another 24 miles of track was completed south of Ashland, to a place called Penokee Gap, including another huge bridge near the place still called Highbridge. From the south, rails were laid from Colby north to Worcester, just south of modern Phillips. Then, with 194 miles of track built, construction stopped again, leaving a 57-mile stretch of wilderness blocking the way to Lake Superior and the land grant money. This time, construction did not resume for three years.

This delay was due largely to the Panic of 1873, an economic crisis which was called the "Great Depression" in the U.S. until the depression of the 1930s took over that name. One of the causes of this economic slump in 1873 was speculation on railroads. The Wisconsin Central had received financial support from towns like Menasha and Stevens Point. By this time, they had spent that money, and with the nationwide economic slump, financier Gardner Colby was having trouble raising more money from his investors. They were already behind on payments to subcontractors and for that reason, in 1874, the construction contractor on the south end quit.

== History ==
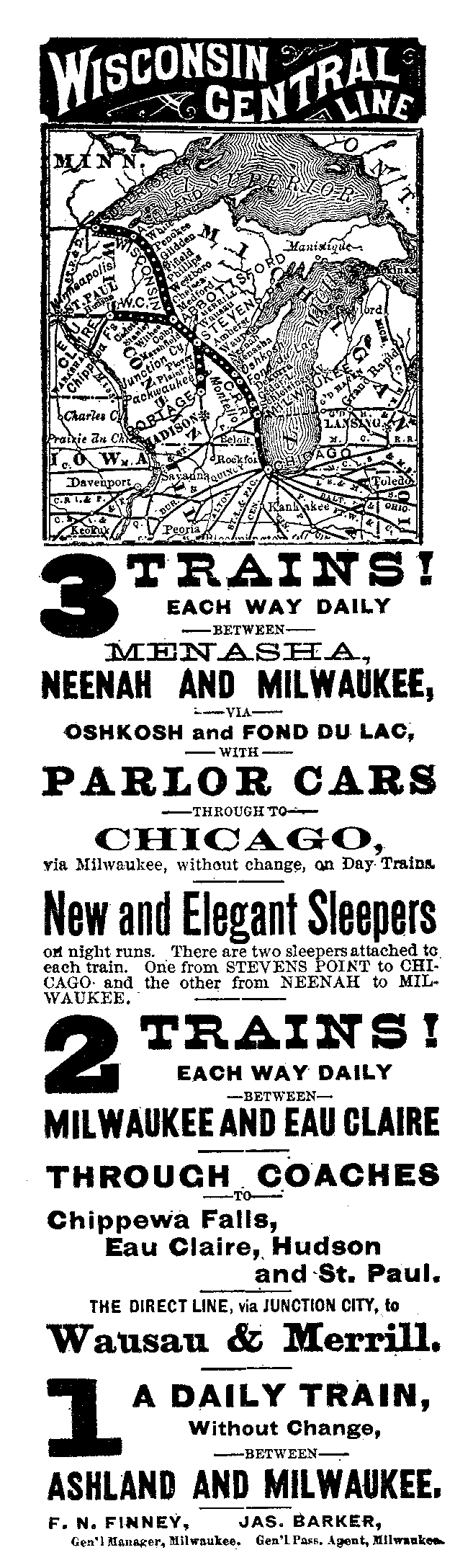
Newspaper advertisement from 1883

The Wisconsin Central's existence as an independent carrier was short-lived. Much of the Wisconsin Central right of way was built over land obtained through a federal land grant. It was the only land grant railroad in Wisconsin. The railroad's tracks reached Ashland in 1877, St. Paul in 1884, Chicago in 1886 and Superior in 1908. The line was leased from 1889 to 1893 by the Northern Pacific Railway. The lease was terminated when the Northern Pacific declared bankruptcy during the Panic of 1893.

While under the control of the Northern Pacific, the Wisconsin Central Railroad constructed Solon Spencer Beman's great Romanesque Grand Central Station in Chicago in 1889 as its southern terminus. When Northern Pacific defaulted on its lease terms in 1893, the Baltimore and Ohio Railroad acquired the several Chicago properties of the Wisconsin Central including Grand Central Station to form the Baltimore and Ohio Chicago Terminal Railroad.
