= Chloe Merrick Reed =

American teacher (1832–1897)

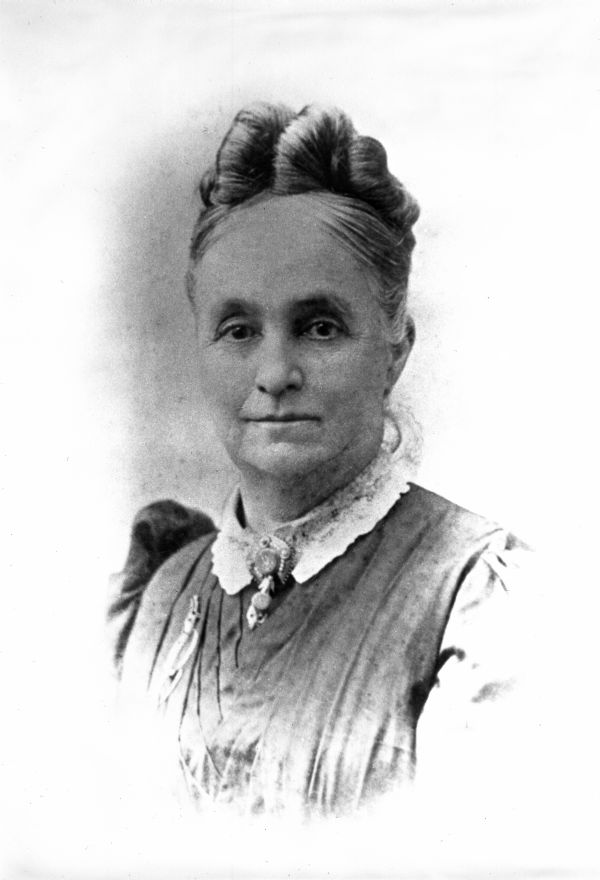
Chloe Merrick Reed.

Chloe Merrick (1832–1897) was an American educator who worked to educate and improve the welfare of freedmen and their children. She established a school on Amelia Island, Florida during and after the American Civil War. In addition to teaching, she conducted appeals to her hometown of Syracuse, New York for contributions of money, goods, and clothes. She also established an orphanage. She later taught freedmen in North Carolina, where she moved for her health. In 1869, Merrick married Florida Republican Governor Harrison M. Reed. She is believed to have influenced his administration in its support for education and welfare for all residents. Public education was expanded in the state in the early 1870s for both black and white children. After Reed left office, Merrick continued to work on those issues, serving in Jacksonville, Florida for several years on the board of the new St. Luke's Hospital Association in the 1880s, which founded the city's first hospital.

== Life ==
Merrick was born near Syracuse, New York in 1832, the youngest child of Sylvanus and Achsah (Pollard) Merrick, who lived near the city. Her siblings, and their ages when she was born, were Montgomery, 20, and Charles, 17, and Emma, 3. Their mother died when Chloe was young and the family moved into the city. With growth after the completion of the Erie Canal through the Mohawk Valley, the city offered many opportunities.

She and her brothers were influenced by the abolitionist movement, which strengthened from the 1840s, and growing support for women's suffrage and rights. Her brothers resisted the Fugitive Slave Act of 1850, taking part in freeing a fugitive slave from court to gain him freedom in Canada. Chloe Merrick taught in Syracuse public schools from 1854 to 1856, and 1860 to 1862, as did her sister Emma and her husband Ansel Kinne, who also served as a principal. The three teachers were close throughout their careers.

In late 1862 Merrick responded to a local effort through the new Freedmen's Relief Association of Syracuse, part of a national organization. She volunteered for one of two positions to teach in Fernandina, Florida. Freed slaves had congregated there on Amelia Island, Florida, which was occupied by Union forces. She left Syracuse in 1863 to work on the island, which had been used for plantation agriculture. There were 1200 former slaves and 200 people of European descent living on the island. Some 200 of the freedmen had volunteered for the Union Army, leaving their families behind. Many of the inhabitants were living in poverty and needed assistance from the government to survive. In addition to teaching them, Merrick raised money for clothing and supplies for the needy. She appealed to her community of Syracuse to aid the people at Fernandina.

Merrick also opened an orphan asylum on the island, which served both black and white children. She collaborated with others to fund the purchase and renovation of the Finegan plantation, which the National Freedmen's Relief Association bought at a tax sale to establish a school. She returned to Syracuse to raise money for this purpose. Under President Andrew Johnson, Confederates reclaimed some of their confiscated properties. In 1866 Merrick had to give up this property and move the orphanage to the St. John's River.

Her brother-in-law Ansel Kinne was appointed as Superintendent of Florida's Freedmen's Bureau schools, starting after the war.

Merrick met the widower Harrison M. Reed in 1863, when he was serving as Tax Commissioner of Florida and toured Amelia Island to review the confiscation of Confederate properties. He courted her, continuing after she left Florida for her health and was working in North Carolina and he had been elected as governor of Florida. They married in 1869 in Syracuse, New York, at the house of her sister Emma and brother-in-law Ansel Kinne. Reed served as governor of Florida from 1868 until 1873.

He was influenced by her efforts to support education and ease the plight of the poor with legislative programs. This included seeking a bill to establish a state university. They had a son, Harrison Jr., together. The public schools in Florida continued to grow: in 1870 there were 250 schools with 7500 children; by 1872, there were 444 schools serving 16,258.

After Reed left office, they lived on a farm south of Jacksonville, Florida along the St. John's River in Duval County. He struggled financially but was elected as state representative from this district. They were busy in community affairs. In addition, Reed received an appointment in 1889 as Tallahassee's postmaster, for the duration of Benjamin Harrison's administration.

Merrick supported legislative and local efforts to alleviate social problems, improve education, and provide relief for the poor. Among these was a privately funded hospital in Jacksonville, organized by Merrick's wealthy sister-in-law, Martha Reed Mitchell. In 1882 Merrick joined the St. Luke's Hospital Association, serving as vice-president and then treasurer for two years each.

Merrick died in 1897 after a long illness following a stroke. She was posthumously honored in the late 20th century as a Great Floridian by a plaque at the historic Simmons-Merrick House at 102 South 10th Street in Fernandina Beach.
