= Summit, Waukesha County, Wisconsin =

Summit
- Village
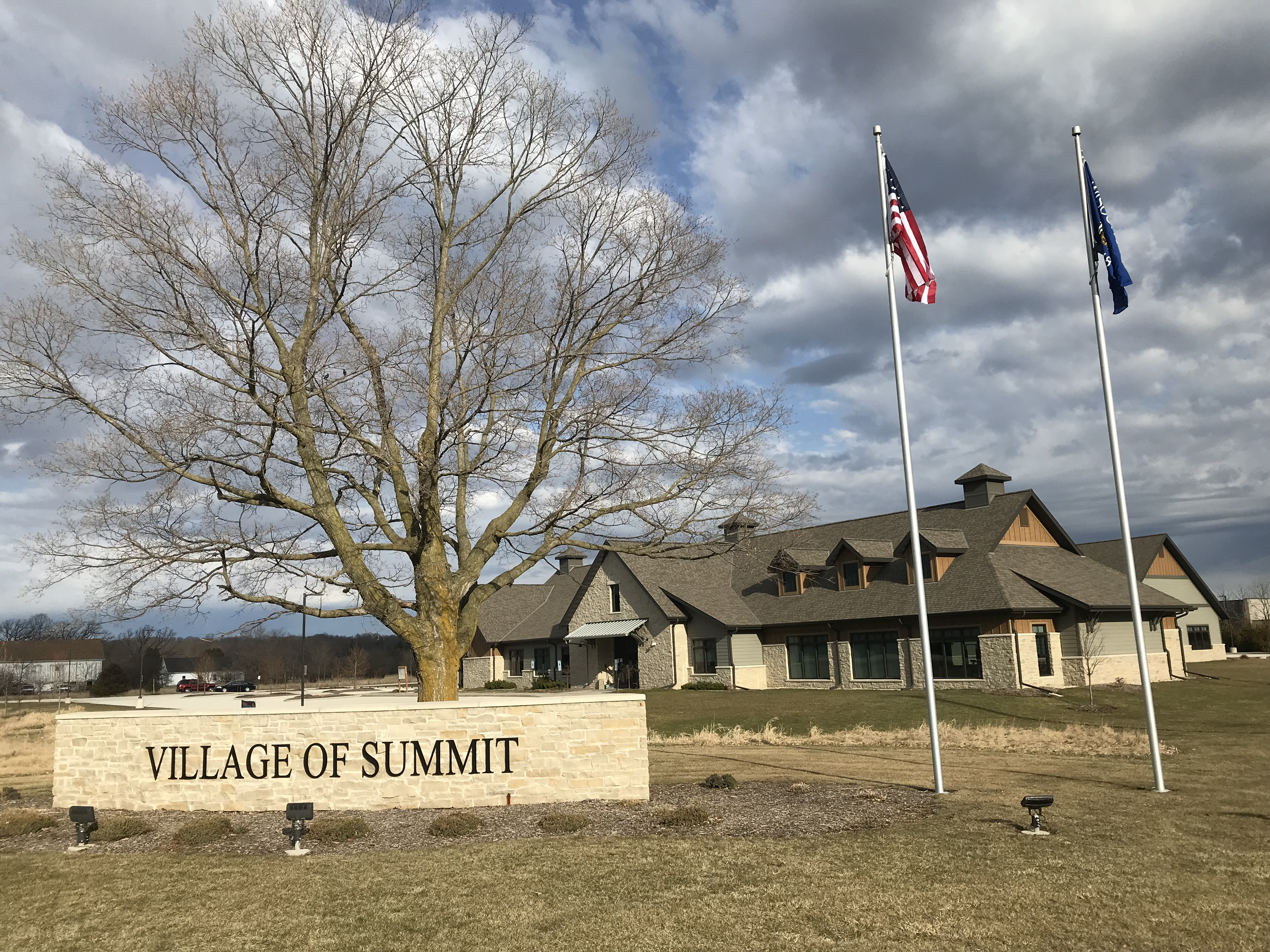
- Summit Village Hall

- Location of Summit in Waukesha County, Wisconsin.
- Coordinates: 43°3′16″N 88°27′50″W
- Country: United States
- State: Wisconsin
- County: Waukesha
- Settled: 1837

Area
  - Total: 24.02 sq mi (62.20 km^{2})
  - Land: 21.00 sq mi (54.39 km^{2})
  - Water: 3.01 sq mi (7.80 km^{2})
- Elevation: 863 ft (263 m)

Population (2020)
  - Total: 4,784
  - Density: 240.0/sq mi (92.68/km^{2})
- Time zone: UTC-6 (Central (CST))
  - Summer (DST): UTC-5 (CDT)
- ZIP Code: 53066
- Area code: 262
- FIPS code: 55-78375
- GNIS feature ID: 1584250
- Website: villageofsummitwi.gov

Summit is a village in Waukesha County, Wisconsin, United States. The population was 4,784 at the 2020 census. The former unincorporated communities of Summit Center, Summit Corners, and Waterville are located in the village.

== History ==
Summit was initially a part of Milwaukee County. The town was first settled in the spring of 1837 by Andrew Baxter. In 1838, Curtis Reed, who was the first town chairman, became the first postmaster. By 1840, there were 335 settlers in Summit's 36 square miles (93 km^{2}). The first town meeting, which took place on April 5, 1842, selected Ralph Frisbie as the first town clerk.

The first church building in the Town of Summit was constructed in 1842 at Nashotah Mission. When the mission was moved to Delafield, St. Mary's Church on highways 67 and 18 became the oldest operating church in the town, dating back to 1871. The 1875 census reported 619 males, 540 females, 2 insane, 0 deaf and dumb, 0 blind and 0 colored. The last Native Americans in the area were seen in 1883. The first Town Hall was built in 1906 and torn down in 1954, after which another was built. On July 29, 2010, the town of Summit became a village. In April 2018 the Village Hall moved into a new building located at 37100 Delafield Road, just south of the previous location.

== Geography ==
According to the United States Census Bureau, the village has a total area of 28.5 square miles (73.8 km^{2}), of which 25.8 square miles (66.7 km^{2}) is land and 2.8 square miles (7.1 km^{2}) (9.68%) is water.

== Demographics ==
Historical population
Census	Pop.	Note	%±
2000	4,999		—
2010	4,676		−6.5%
2020	4,784		2.3%
2025 (est.)	5,323		11.3%
U.S. Decennial Census

As of the census of 2000, there were 4,999 people, 1,747 households, and 1,416 families residing in the town. The population density was 194.1 people per square mile (75.0/km^{2}). There were 1,904 housing units at an average density of 73.9 per square mile (28.5/km^{2}). The racial makeup of the village was 97.26% White, 0.80% African American, 0.14% Native American, 0.86% Asian, 0.34% from other races, and 0.60% from two or more races. Hispanic or Latino of any race were 1.40% of the population.

There were 1,747 households, out of which 36.8% had children under the age of 18 living with them, 73.3% were married couples living together, 5.4% had a female householder with no husband present, and 18.9% were non-families. About 14.9% of all households were made up of individuals, and 5.3% had someone living alone who was 65 years of age or older. The average household size was 2.76 and the average family size was 3.07.

In the village, the population was spread out, with 27.7% under the age of 18, 5.1% from 18 to 24, 28.2% from 25 to 44, 28.4% from 45 to 64, and 10.6% who were 65 years of age or older. The median age was 40 years. For every 100 females, there were 102.9 males. For every 100 females age 18 and over, there were 100.1 males.

The median income for a household in the town was $71,884, and the median income for a family was $76,859. Males had a median income of $53,214 versus $35,240 for females. The per capita income for the village was $28,797. About 4.2% of families and 5.0% of the population were below the poverty line, including 5.5% of those under age 18 and 3.5% of those age 65 or over.

== Education ==
Most of the community is in the Oconomowoc Area School District, with other sections in the Kettle Moraine School District. Oconomowoc High School is the public high school of the Oconomowoc district.

== Notable people ==
- Elisha W. Edgerton, member of the Wisconsin State Assembly
- John D. McDonald, member of the Wisconsin State Assembly
- Eliphalet Stone, member of the Wisconsin State Assembly

Gustave Pabst, a prominent Milwaukee businessman, purchased land adjoining the Frederick Pabst Estate, where he built the 40,000 sqft Ventnor Mansion.
