= Neighborhoods of Jacksonville =

Neighborhoods in Florida, US

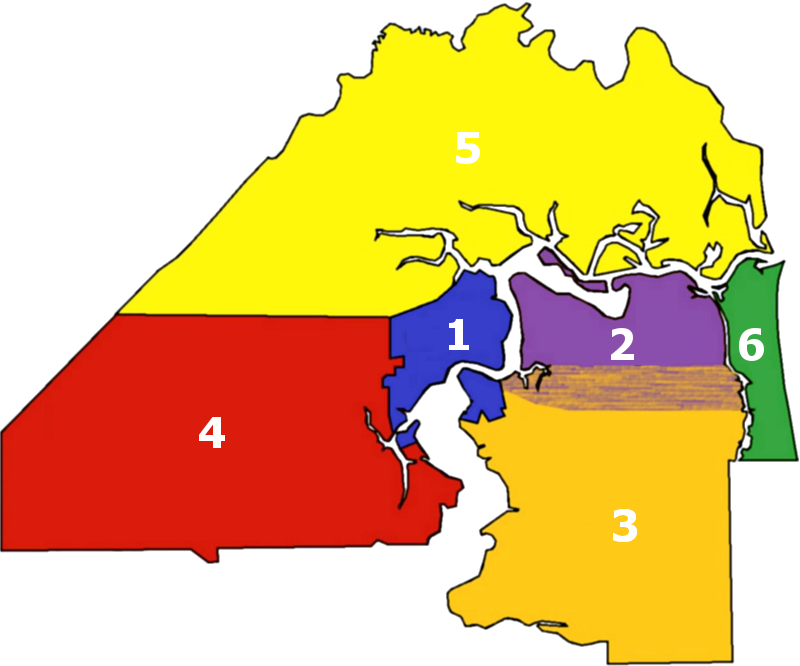
Approximation of the vernacular areas of Jacksonville: 1. Urban core neighborhoods – city limits before Consolidation; 2. Arlington; 3. Southside; 4. Westside; 5. Northside; 6. Beaches

There are more than 500 neighborhoods within the area of Jacksonville, Florida, the largest city in the contiguous United States by area. These include Downtown Jacksonville and surrounding neighborhoods. Additionally, greater Jacksonville is traditionally divided into several major sections with amorphous boundaries: Northside, Westside, Southside, and Arlington, as well as the Jacksonville Beaches.

Four municipalities within Duval County are outside of Jacksonville's city limits: Baldwin, Atlantic Beach, Neptune Beach, and Jacksonville Beach. The latter three communities, all located on a coastal barrier island, form part of the area known as the Jacksonville Beaches, together with Mayport within the Jacksonville city limits and Ponte Vedra Beach in St. Johns County.

== Regions ==
Jacksonville consolidated with Duval County in 1968; as such its city limits largely match the county borders. The City of Jacksonville estimates that there are over 500 neighborhoods within this area. In addition, the greater area of Jacksonville is often divided into several large sections with amorphous boundaries. The areas include both urban neighborhoods within the old city limits as well as further-out suburban and rural communities. Three have "directional" names, a common characteristic in geographical areas. The most commonly used vernacular areas are Northside, located north of Downtown; Arlington, east of Downtown across the St. Johns River; Southside, across the river from Downtown to the south, and Westside, to the west of Downtown. Additionally, the Jacksonville Beaches designates the group of towns and communities along the Atlantic coast.

Additionally, the City of Jacksonville uses six planning districts for some governmental purposes such as organizing Citizens Planning Advisory Committees (CPACs). These districts partially correspond to the vernacular areas. They are the Urban Core, comprising Downtown Jacksonville and some urban neighborhoods to the north; Greater Arlington/Beaches, including the Arlington area north of Beach Boulevard as well as the parts of the Beaches within the Jacksonville city limits; Southeast, corresponding to the Southside area south of Beach Boulevard; Southwest, consisting of the southern Westside; Northwest, comprising areas to the north and west of the Urban Core; and Northside, representing the northernmost parts of the county.

== Downtown ==
Downtown is the central business district of Jacksonville. The oldest section of the city, it is traditionally defined by the original boundaries of the city set upon its establishment. It is the center of Jacksonville's Urban Core, which includes the surrounding neighborhoods of LaVilla, Springfield, East Jacksonville, and Brooklyn, plus a section on the south side of the St. Johns River known as Southbank.

The area that became downtown Jacksonville was on the north bank of a crossing on the St. Johns River known as Wacca Pilatka to the Seminole and as the Cow Ford to the British. The land that became the town was largely drawn from two land grants from 1816, during Florida's Second Spanish Period: one to Maria Taylor, née Suarez, and one to Juan LeMaestre. By 1821 a small community had grown there, and local residents plotted out the streets for a town, which they soon named "Jacksonville" after Andrew Jackson.

The town was occupied by Union troops for much of the American Civil War, and steady growth came after the war's end, when it became one of Florida's first major tourist destinations. In 1887 Jacksonville annexed several surrounding suburbs. Nearly all of downtown burned in the Great Fire of 1901; however a significant building boom followed immediately after.

Today, the city's definition of Downtown Jacksonville covers a wider area than the traditional Downtown Core, and is made up of several different neighborhoods or districts.

=== Downtown Core ===
The Downtown Core, also known as the Northbank, is Jacksonville's traditional city center. It comprises roughly the area south of State Street, west of Hogans Creek, north of the St. Johns, and east of about Jefferson Street. It contains many government offices, corporate skyscrapers, and regional amenities. It is sometimes subdivided into smaller districts, including the Cathedral District and Riverfront District.

=== LaVilla ===
LaVilla is a historic neighborhood located immediately west of Downtown. Jacksonville's first suburb, it was originally an independent city until it was annexed in 1887 along with several other suburbs. It included streets west of Clay Street and north of McCoy's Creek and the railroad lines. The part of LaVilla north of Adams Street was for many years a center of African-American life and culture in Jacksonville. Most residents were Black, and the neighborhood contained many venues, such as the Ritz Theatre and the many clubs on the Ashley Street strip, which showcased Black entertainers. The southern part of the neighborhood was a major railroad hub, with several rail lines meeting at Union Station (now the Prime F. Osborn III Convention Center), and probably not coincidentally, was also for a period Jacksonville's primary red light district.

LaVilla was incorporated in the 1860s as a predominantly African-American town. Union troops were based in the area during the American Civil War. Along with five other suburbs, it was annexed by Jacksonville when the city limits expanded in 1887. The Great Fire of 1901 started in LaVilla, but the neighborhood was largely spared, while the fire ravaged downtown. Over the next several decades LaVilla saw the growth of a burgeoning music and entertainment scene, and many nationally renowned artists came to play at the local clubs on and off Ashely Street that catered to Black audiences. In the 1960s, however, the neighborhood declined precipitously and has not recovered. The railroad industry declined and urban decay set in, and after the end of segregation many residents left to seek opportunities in other neighborhoods. In the 1980s began an urban renewal campaign that continues today.

=== Brooklyn ===
Brooklyn is located south of LaVilla along the St. Johns River, immediately to the north of Riverside. All of this area was plantation land until after the American Civil War, and changed hands a number of times during the 19th century. After the war it was acquired by Miles Price, who sold the southern half of the property to be developed as the suburb of Riverside. The northern section he retained and developed himself as Brooklyn.

It appears that Price gave the development its name, but it is not known why a former staunch Confederate would have chosen a name so associated with the New York borough of Brooklyn. At any rate, Price's Brooklyn was initially a residential suburb, growing quickly with the establishment of a streetcar line. Brooklyn is a historically African-American neighborhood in which houses were built for Buffalo Soldiers. In 1887 Brooklyn and several other suburbs were annexed by Jacksonville. Brooklyn remained primarily residential into the 20th century, until it was rezoned for commercial use, and a number of commercial skyscrapers and other building were constructed along the river. In the late 20th and early 21st century plans have been made to reintroduce residential zoning.

=== Southbank ===
The Southbank is a mixed-used district directly across the St. Johns River from the Downtown Core, closely associated with Jacksonville's San Marco neighborhood. It includes large office and residential structures, such as the Aetna Building, The Peninsula, and Riverplace Tower. Attractions such as the Museum of Science and History, Friendship Fountain and the Southbank Riverwalk can also be found in the district. Though historically poorly designed for pedestrians, the city hopes to better integrate it with the rest of Downtown as well as San Marco.

== Riverside and Avondale ==
Riverside and Avondale are two adjacent and closely associated neighborhoods, alternately described as one continuous neighborhood, to the south of Downtown on the St. Johns River. Both neighborhoods are primarily residential, containing some of the city's most notable examples of residential architecture, with integrated business districts, including the historic Five Points area and King Street District.

The entire area south of Jacksonville was originally plantation land prior to the Civil War. After the war, a group of investors purchased the southern part of Miles Price's plantation to develop as a new residential suburb. Price retained the northern part of his land and developed it as the suburb of Brooklyn. Riverside and Brooklyn were annexed by Jacksonville in 1887, but growth only boomed after the Great Fire of 1901, when many of the city's most prominent residents chose to rebuild their homes in Riverside. Growth continued through the early 20th century, resulting in one of the most varied architectural landscapes in Florida, including what is likely the largest collection of surviving bungalow houses in the state. In the late 1950s & 1960s, the area went into decay, with many of those grand old homes being converted into rooming houses. However, after being designated a "National Historic Neighborhood", by the late 1990s, Riverside had recovered, with many homes restored to their original form.

Avondale was developed later. In 1920 it was proposed as a new upscale development, the most expansive Jacksonville had ever experienced. Avondale is known for its quiet, tree-lined residential streets and hundreds of quaint homes, most dating from the early 1920s during the Great Florida Land Boom. A few Avondale homes pre-date 1900. Most homes in the neighborhood reflect the upper income taste in residential architecture of the 1920s, including numerous Prairie School, Art Deco, Craftsman Style, Classical Revival, and Mediterranean Revival styles. Avondale is characterized by numerous bungalows and spacious, graceful homes. Unlike some other neighborhoods, Avondale never experienced a period of decline during the latter 20th century, and retains much of its original gentility. Many of its residents are financially stable with very high income.

Riverside and Avondale are routinely recognized as among the great neighborhoods in Jacksonville and Florida, and in 2010 they were named one of the top ten neighborhoods in the United States by American Planning Association.

== Springfield ==
Springfield is a historic residential neighborhood located immediately north of Downtown. This area was originally part of the "Hogans' Donation", which was divided up following the Civil War for residential development. The original Springfield development dates to 1869; over time other developments were absorbed into a single community, all of which were annexed by Jacksonville in 1887. Springfield became home to many of Jacksonville's wealthiest residents, and boomed following the Great Fire of 1901, with many lavish houses being built. However, zoning changes in the late 1920s altered the residential character of the neighborhood, and the urban decay afflicting most of the United States' inner city neighborhoods since the mid-20th century sent Springfield into substantial decline. In 1975 a preservation society was formed with the intent of saving Springfield's architectural heritage, resulting in a resurgence of growth. According to author Wayne Wood, "Springfield is destined to re-emerge as one of Jacksonville's successful residential neighborhoods." In 2011, Southern Living named Springfield one of "The South's Best Comeback Neighborhoods".

== Eastside ==
Eastside, or East Jacksonville, is a residential neighborhood located directly to the east of Downtown and Springfield. Unlike the areas known as Northside, Westside, and Southside, Eastside does not comprise a large section of Duval County. Eastside contains Jacksonville's sports complex, including TIAA Bank Field, VyStar Veterans Memorial Arena, and the Baseball Grounds of Jacksonville.

The original East Jacksonville development was a small residential community located east of Jacksonville along the St. Johns River, which grew up shortly after the Civil War.

Eastside has remained the center of Jacksonville's annual Fair and sports complexes, as well as a center of industry in the city. As with other inner city neighborhoods across the United States it underwent precipitous decline since the mid-20th century. For many years, the commercial district on Florida Avenue (now A. Philip Randolph Boulevard) was a major neighborhood center. However, many of its shops were destroyed in a 1969 riot that started when a white cigarette salesman shot a Black man he said was robbing his truck. Neither the Avenue nor the neighborhood has recovered, though in more recent times, the Eastside has been the center of urban renewal projects.

=== Oakland and Fairfield ===
Two other communities grew up after the Civil War; Oakland and Fairfield. Oakland, located just north of East Jacksonville, was a working-class, largely African-American community. Oakland Park was the city's first park for African American children. Eartha M. M. White helped get it established. Fairfield was located farther east, along the northward bend of the river. Its attraction was as the location of Jacksonville's first Fairgrounds, which was the source of its name. These included a racetrack, the forerunner to Jacksonville's sports venues. Fairfield was incorporated as a city; in 1887 all three communities were among those annexed by Jacksonville. They soon grew into one continuous neighborhood.

== San Marco ==
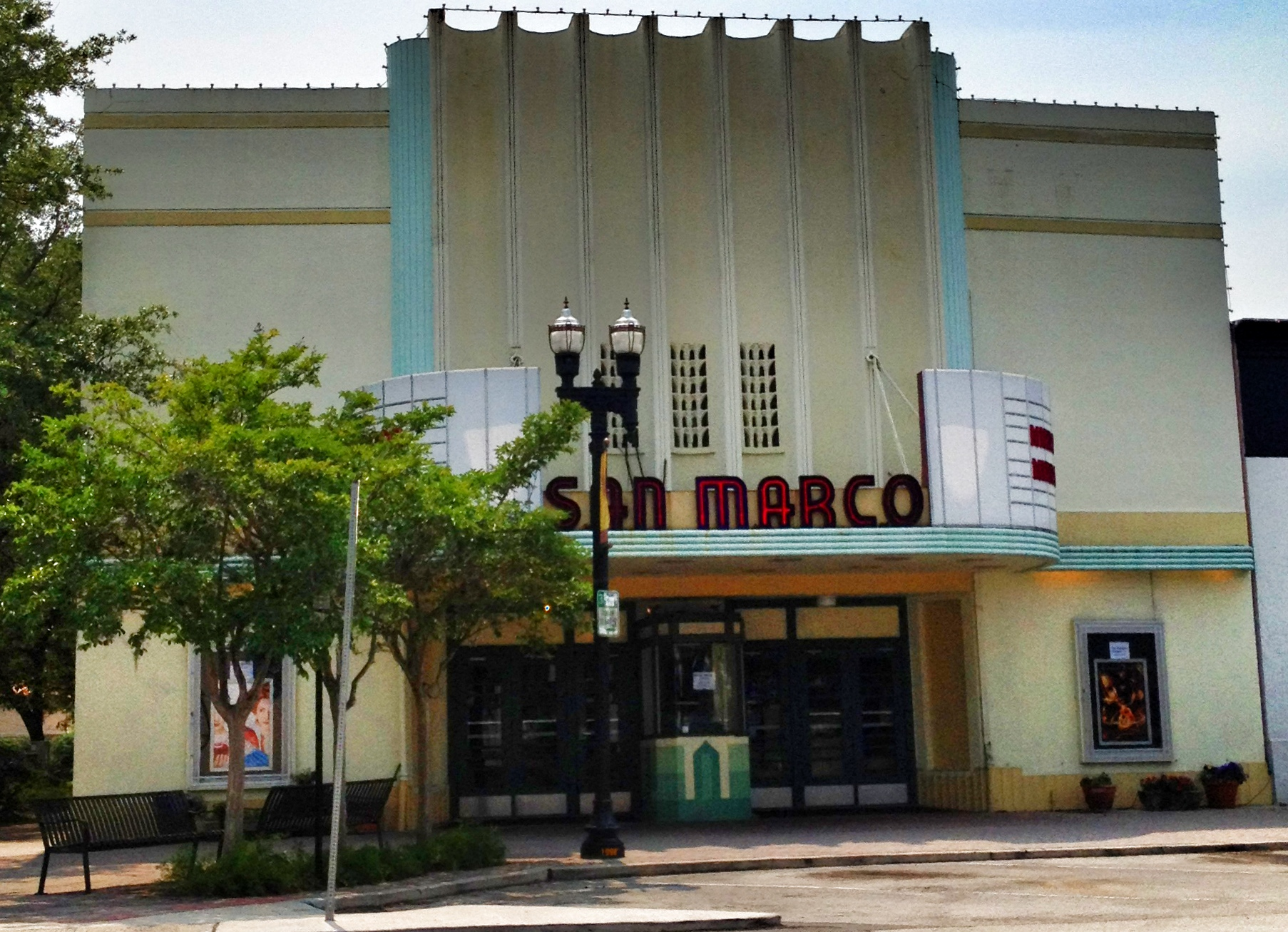
San Marco Theatre

San Marco is a neighborhood south of Downtown Jacksonville, across the St. Johns River. Its origins are with the former city of South Jacksonville. Today, most of what was once the city of South Jacksonville is known as San Marco, while South Jacksonville or Southside is used for a much wider section of southern Duval County.

The area which is now San Marco was occupied continuously long before what is now Downtown Jacksonville. It was the site of the ferry that crossed the Cow Ford, and was the site of plantations from the 18th century. After the Civil War these gave way to residential developments, including Oklahoma and South Jacksonville, the latter of which came to absorb the other communities. South Jacksonville was incorporated as a city in 1907, and grew significantly following the construction of the original Acosta Bridge in 1921. In 1932 South Jacksonville was annexed by Jacksonville.

The name San Marco comes from South Jacksonville's most ambitious development, begun in 1926 and consisting of many upscale Mediterranean Revival-style homes and an integrated commercial sector known as San Marco Square. Later, as South Jacksonville or Southside came to be applied to a wider and wider area of the city, San Marco has been applied to most of the area formerly a part of South Jacksonville. San Marco remains a diverse and architecturally significant neighborhood, with many of its former government buildings and homes surviving.

The southern border of San Marco ends at Greenridge Road, where the historic Red Bank house sits on the cape of Point La Vista.

== St. Nicholas ==
St. Nicholas is a small neighborhood on the south side of the St. Johns River, just east of San Marco. Like San Marco it was inhabited long before the area now comprising Downtown Jacksonville. During Florida's Second Spanish Period, it was the site of Fort San Nicolas, which guarded the river crossing at the Cowford. This led to the area between the ferry and Miller's Creek being known as "San Nicolas". The name was later Anglicized to St. Nicholas.

After the Civil War this area was the site of vacation and retirement homes for several wealthy Jacksonville residents. Some of their former homes remain in the area. Today St. Nicholas is a chiefly residential neighborhood with some commercial zoning along Beach and Atlantic Boulevards.

== Ortega ==
Ortega is located on the St. Johns River just south of the Riverside and Avondale area. It lies on a peninsula jutting into the St. Johns River, separated from the mainland by the St. Johns River to the east and the smaller waterway known as the Ortega River to the north and west. It was formerly an island until a land bridge was constructed on the southern end; this now carries U.S. Route 17, or Roosevelt Boulevard. Ortega is one of the wealthiest neighborhoods in Jacksonville and one of the wealthiest in the United States; it was listed as the 46th wealthiest are in Worth magazine.

Ortega is bisected by U.S. 17; the older area to the east of the road is known as "Old Ortega", while the area to the west is known as "Ortega Forest". On July 14, 2004, a section of Ortega to the east of 17 and north of Verona Avenue was designated as the Old Ortega Historic District by the National Register of Historic Districts. The history of the area includes a number of interesting characters: botanist William Bartram; highwayman and cattle rustler Daniel McGirt; and Don Juan McQueen, who attempted to establish a plantation on his 1791 Ortega land grant, but was forced to leave due to attacks of Georgians and the French. Gangster George "Machine Gun" Kelly and his wife were rumored to be the mysterious couple who abruptly left their rented Grand Avenue home hours before a midnight police raid in 1933. Ortega is home to hundreds of mid-size to large, turn-of-the-century homes and Southern-style mansions. Many of these homes are situated directly on the river, and the nature of the "island" allows ease of access to the waterways for all residents. Along with Avondale and Riverside, Ortega is home to some of the wealthiest of Jacksonville families. It is marked by a distinctly traditional Southern culture complete with one of the South's most exclusive debutante coteries. The island is almost all residential, the only exception being a small square in the section known as "Old Ortega" on the north side where a small collection of restaurants, boutiques, and a pharmacy are found. Ortega, with its giant oaks, waterfront mansions, and series of parks is widely considered one of the most beautiful residential areas of Northeast Florida. Naval Air Station Jacksonville is also located on the south side of this neighborhood.

== Northside ==
The Northside is a region of Jacksonville, generally understood as a counterpart to the city's other large regions, the Urban Core, Arlington, Southside, Westside, and the Beaches. The expansive area houses a sizable share of the city's transportation and logistics infrastructure, including Jacksonville International Airport, Jacksonville station, JAXPORT Cruise Terminal, Blount Island Marine Terminal and Dames Point Marine Terminal. The area is also home to the Jacksonville Zoo and Gardens. There is no consistent definition for what constitute the boundaries of the Northside, but by using a Geographic Information System to sort names of 47 businesses with "Northside" in their name, geographer John W. McEwen determined that the Northside is roughly north of the urban core and Westside at 20th Street, and stretching west and north of the St. Johns River.

=== Brentwood ===
Brentwood is a historic residential community with a dense collection of Bungalow architecture. The Brentwood Realty Investment Company under C.W. Bartleson, President, began marketing the neighborhood in 1913. The original subdivision was roughly defined by 26th Street to the south, 35th Street to the north, Pearl Street to the east and Davis Street to the west.

=== Panama Park ===
Panama Park is a neighborhood on Jacksonville's Northside. "Panama" was the site of East Florida's first steam-powered sawmill in 1828. The area grew up as a suburb of Jacksonville through the 19th century, connected to the city by two popular roads. Major growth came after 1905, and a new school designed by Henry J. Klutho was built in 1915. Panama Park was annexed by Jacksonville in 1931.

=== Riverview ===
Riverview is a neighborhood on the Northside of Jacksonville, bordered by the Trout River to the North and East, Ribault River to the South, and Ribault Ave to the West. Riverview was originally platted and developed to be a suburb of Jacksonville in 1911 by Dr. E.H. Armstrong. He announced available sites offered "America's greatest opportunities to the intelligent Caucasian Race to own a beautiful home." Armstrong also converted his 25-acre waterfront home property into Riverview Tropical Gardens, an attraction with boating, fishing and garden trails of roses, azaleas, and lilies. In the 1950s, the Gardens were turned into Sid Walker's Riverview Amusement Park. In 1979, the city of Jacksonville purchased the land and converted the property into a park.

=== Tallulah-North Shore ===
Tallulah-North Shore is a neighborhood located in the Northside area, on the southern banks of the Trout River. First developed in 1879, the primarily residential area was annexed by Jacksonville in 1925. The Trout River is Tallulah-North Shore's most scenic feature and also forms the neighborhood's northern border.

== Westside ==
Like Northside, Westside or West Jacksonville is one of the traditional large sections of Jacksonville. It refers to the large section of Jacksonville west of Downtown and the interior neighborhoods, including both populated areas and a vast tract of undeveloped land. Using GIS to sort 45 businesses with "Westside" in their name, John W. McEwen mapped the Westside as being west of the St. Johns River and Downtown at approximately Interstate 95, and south and west of the Northside. Neighborhoods sometimes included as part of the Westside include Argyle, Riverside and Avondale, Ortega, Cedar Hills, Lake Shore, Murray Hill, Normandy, Sweetwater, and Confederate Point.

=== Lake Shore ===
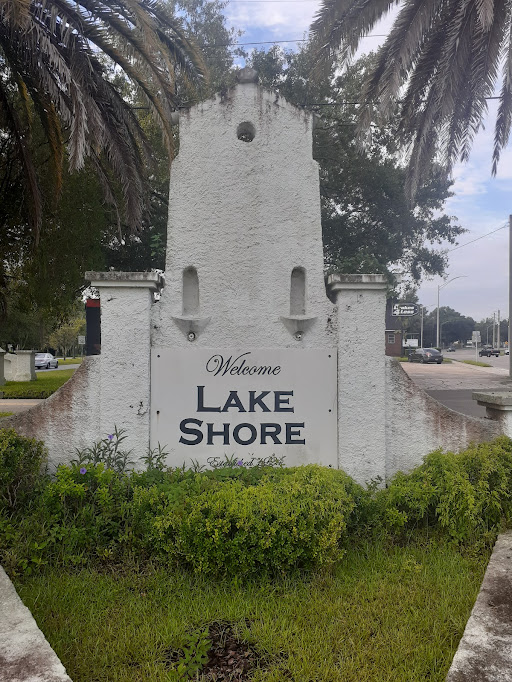
Stucco entrance sign to Lake Shore neighborhood, built in the mid-1920s

Originally established by the 1920s with its main commercial center at San Juan Avenue and Blanding Boulevard dating back to at least 1906, Lake Shore is immediately south of Murray Hill, Riverside and Avondale, Fishweir Creek, and is bound by the Cedar River (called Cedar Creek by locals) to the west and south. Inland from the Ortega historic district and McGirts Creek to the east, the community consists of historic homes both inland and along the waterfront, a cluster of Spanish Colonial estate homes, as well as many postwar frame, brick, and stucco bungalows.

South of Park Street, situated at the southwestern stretch of Avondale's St. Johns Avenue, spanning nearly a mile between Blanding and Lake Shore Boulevards, Lake Shore Terrace is a collection of mid-century modern homes built on larger lots developed by the Brownett and Fort Building company between 1951 and 1953 just north of San Juan Avenue Florida State Road 128.

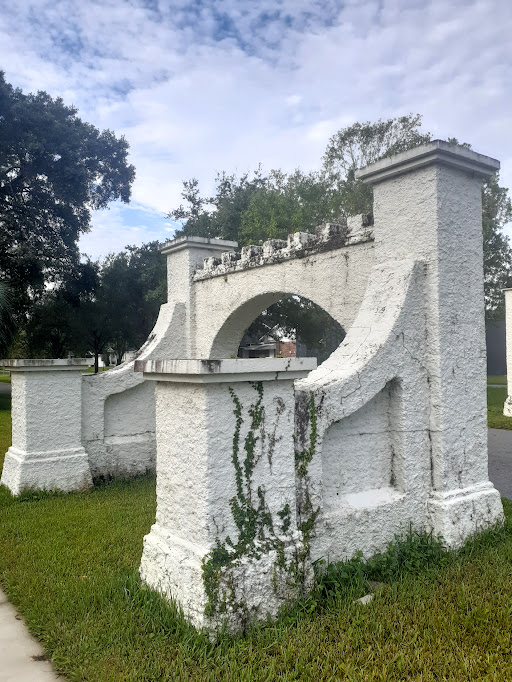
Stucco arch on Appleton Avenue, part of the entry gates to the Lake Shore neighborhood in Jacksonville

In 2009, the arched gateways which mark the entrance to Bayview Road in the heart of Lake Shore were restored and designated as historic landmarks by the City of Jacksonville Historic Preservation Commission and Lakeshore Area Preservation Society.

Bisected by the northern end of State Road 21 (Blanding Boulevard), Lake Shore is home to the Jacksonville Marina Mile which is a regionally unique combination of full service marinas, nautical outfitters, and dry storage facilities that advantageously line the tidal calm of the recreational watercourse on the west bank of McGirts Creek at the confluence of Cedar Creek and the St. Johns River.

=== Murray Hill ===
Murray Hill (Heights), in Jacksonville took the name of a neighborhood in Manhattan, New York City. While the neighborhood was created in 1907, the town of Murray Hill was incorporated in 1916 with its own mayor. The City of Jacksonville annexed the town on August 15, 1925.

Murray Hill is a neighborhood in Jacksonville that is filled with multiple parks, restaurants, bars, community gardens and an art center.

Most of the parks are located within the neighborhoods. Some of the parks in Murray Hill are: Four Corners Park, Murray Hill Playground, Jasmine Park, Powers Park and Cameron Park.

The community garden, located right by Four Corners Park, was maintained by the Murray Hill community. However, in 2017, two new homes were built, on the land previously used for the garden.

The architecture in Murray Hill is very diverse. There are brick, wood, stucco, concrete, bungalows, cottages, modern and southern style homes. Most of the homes are smaller, thus making it perfect for younger families, and retirees. The homes in Murray Hill are older, but the area is not registered as a historic neighborhood. The oldest existing house in Murray Hill was built in 1898 located on Talbot Avenue.

The main strip located in Murray Hill is called Edgewood Avenue South. This road is filled with store fronts that have older and newer merchants. Some of the older/original merchants are Edgewood Bakery, Dreamete and Murray Hill Theater. Newer merchants include Maple Street Biscuit Company, Community Loaves, and Moon River Pizza. It is also home to the Murray Hill Farmer's Market started by Nadia Korths and Miranda Jayde Anderson. The neighborhood has been going through a period of gentrification.

Murray Hill is right beside the thriving neighborhoods Riverside and Avondale near Downtown Jacksonville.

=== New Town ===
New Town is an urban Westside neighborhood located immediately west of LaVilla and Downtown. A working class, primarily African-American residential neighborhood, it was developed in the early 20th century. It is the location of Edward Waters College, Florida's oldest historically Black college. By the 21st century the neighborhood showed many signs of urban decay, plagued by crime, failing schools, health issues and endemic poverty. In 2008 the city established the New Town Success Zone modeled after New York City's Harlem Children's Zone to provide comprehensive social and educational programs and services to the neighborhood.

=== Durkeeville ===
Durkeeville was a low-cost housing project and neighborhood for African Americans, construction of which started in 1936. It is named for the land owner who sold it to the project. It had 215 units and was bounded by 6th, Payne, and McConihe Streets, and Myrtle Avenue. J. P. Small Memorial Stadium is located in Durkeeville.

== Arlington ==
Together with Northside, Westside, and Southside, Arlington is one of the large sections of Duval County. Initially, Arlington was a settlement to the east across the St. Johns River from Jacksonville; today, it refers to most of Jacksonville east and south of the St. Johns, west of the Intracoastal Waterway, and north of the Arlington River and Southside. Using GIS to sort 87 businesses with "Arlington" in their name, McEwen came to a similar definition, though he noted that Arlington overlaps with Southside at its southern end.

Arlington was one of the first areas in the United States visited by Europeans. It was the site of the French Fort Caroline in 1564–1565, now represented by the Fort Caroline National Memorial. After the destruction of Fort Caroline, the area was only sparsely inhabited until the 19th century, when sawmills and plantations were established along the St. Johns River. After the American Civil War these gave way to residential developments, which were gradually absorbed into the Arlington community as it grew. The construction of the Mathews Bridge in 1953 opened the area up to significantly increased development, and over the next two decades Arlington became the fastest growing part of the Jacksonville area.

=== Sandalwood ===
The Sandalwood neighborhood began developing in the spring of 1960, midway between downtown Jacksonville and the beaches, or about 6 miles (9.7 km) from each, was advertised in 1960–61 as "On the Southside - halfway between business and pleasure!" The builder-developer, Pearce-Uible, was located at 3850 Beach Blvd.

== Southside ==
Southside, or South Jacksonville, is, along with Northside, Westside, and Arlington, one of the larger sections of Jacksonville. Originally the name "South Jacksonville" applied to the area to the south of Downtown across the St. Johns River, a neighborhood now typically called San Marco. Today, however, the term covers a much larger region. Using GIS data to sort 45 business with "Southside" in their name, McEwen defined an area east and south of the St. Johns River, north of the Mandarin neighborhood, inland from the Intracoastal Waterway, and south of Arlington. However, he noted that Southside overlaps with Arlington at its northern bounds.

=== Avenues/Deercreek ===
Deercreek is a gated country club community of 750 homes east of Philips Hwy. on the Southside of Jacksonville established in 1989 before the Avenues Mall opened.

=== Baymeadows ===
Jacksonville's Baymeadows Golf Club was a 500-acre private golf and residential community developed by Paul & Jerome Fletcher that opened in May 1968 when the I-95 interchange at Baymeadows Road was built. That event opened the floodgates for development in the neighborhood with business parks, apartment complexes, restaurants, motels and gas stations. Baymeadow's Deerwood Village Mall, opened in 1972, was one of Jacksonville's earliest suburban shopping centers in support of the Deerwood, and it is still a popular retail location after 50+ years.

=== Town Center ===
The Town Center area, centered around St. Johns Town Center, is an informal subdistrict within Jacksonville's Southside that has developed into a major commercial, residential, and entertainment hub. The area generally encompasses the Town Center Parkway corridor, much of Gate Parkway between Interstate 295 and Southside Boulevard, both north and south of Butler Boulevard and portions of the St. Johns Bluff Road area adjacent to the University of North Florida campus. Its boundaries are informal and loosely defined, with some overlap with nearby areas such as Deerwood.

=== Deerwood ===
Jacksonville's Deerwood neighborhood was founded in the early 1960s as the Deerwood Country Club, the first gated community in Florida, developed by the Skinner family on land originally purchased by R.G. Skinner in the 1890s. It was designed as a luxury community with a George Cobb-designed golf course and expanded to include a swimming pool, tennis courts, horseback riding, hunting and social activities. The community is known for its estate homes, mature landscaping, lakes, and as a symbol of prestige in Northeast Florida.

A newspaper article in 2005 stated: "Deerwood became the new place to live, the protected place to raise a family and the coveted community for outsiders to snag a dinner invitation. The Times-Union regularly featured its stylish homes and equally stylish homeowners."

=== Mandarin ===
Mandarin is located on the east side of the St. Johns River just north of the border with St. Johns County. It was at one point a separate city, and was incorporated into Jacksonville in the Jacksonville Consolidation in 1968.

Mandarin originated as an orange grove farming community, and went by several names before receiving its current designation, picked for the Mandarin orange. After the Civil War was the summer home of author Harriet Beecher Stowe, whose book Palmetto Leaves was inspired by her experiences there. Mandarin remained a quiet community until 1970, when the construction of the Buckman Bridge, connecting Mandarin to Orange Park across the river, ushered in a new wave of development, and Mandarin subsequently became one of Jacksonville's fastest growing neighborhoods.

=== San Jose ===
San Jose is an historic suburban neighborhood of Jacksonville, Florida on the city's Southside, 4½ miles from Downtown. The residential streets have homes that vary from million-dollar waterfront mansions to small wood-frame starters with a variety of architectural styles, including midcentury modern ranch-style homes, Spanish Revival bungalows, and more contemporary designs. Landmarks include the San Jose Country Club, The Bolles School and Epping Forest Yacht & Country Club. In the 1920s, it was a planned community derailed by the Depression. San Jose is located 4½ miles south of Downtown along the east bank of the St. Johns River, south to San Clerc Road; bounded on the east by the railroad tracks west of U.S. Highway 1 and north by Hendricks Avenue.

The construction of I-95 in the 1960s, a few miles east of San Jose, transformed a rural area into the city's Southside. It shifted development away from San Jose, preserving it as primarily a residential area.

=== Southpoint ===
Southpoint is a commercial section of Jacksonville, Florida on the city's Southside area, eight miles from downtown. The area consists primarily of commercial buildings, apartment complexes and professional office centers. St. Lukes Hospital, built in 1984, is on the corner of Southpoint. It is now known as St. Vincent's Medical Center Southside. Many of the hospital's doctors have offices in Southpoint.

Southpoint is located in the fast-growing southeast quadrant of Jacksonville, along J. Turner Butler Boulevard, an expressway which serves as a major thoroughfare to and from the Jacksonville Beaches.

Southpoint's boundaries are roughly Interstate 95 to the west, Bowden Road to the north, Belfort Road to the east, and Butler Boulevard to the south. Some businesses between I-95 and Philips Highway use Southpoint to reference their location. Streets within Southpoint include Southpoint Parkway, Southpoint Drive North & South, Southpoint Boulevard, and Salisbury Road.

When the initial segment of J. Turner Butler Boulevard (State Road 202) was completed in 1979 and access to land around Butler Blvd improved, facilitating development of the area east of Interstate 95.

Gate Petroleum partnered with the Bryant Skinner Company in 1980 to create the 250-acre (1.0 km^{2}) Southpoint office park.

=== Sunbeam ===
Sunbeam is a suburban residential neighborhood located in southern Jacksonville, Florida. From the 1970s to the early 1990s Sunbeam Road was known for its landfill. In early 2008 it was announced that a nine-hole golf course would open on the former landfill, but it did not. In late 2020 construction began on Everlake, an active adult development and Aterro, a recreational park with multiple uses.

Some subdivisions are older, constructed from 1970 to 1999, but over 70% of apartments and developments are newer, built after 2000.

The neighborhood is occupied by both renters and owners. Dwellings are mostly large (4-5+) or medium (3–4) bedroom single-family residences and townhomes. Sunbeam is an excellent family-friendly area with good schools, low crime and homes occupied by their owners. The area has a high percentage of parents with college degrees and over 70% of the residents are married.

The average income in Sunbeam is higher than nearly 90% of neighborhoods in the U.S.; only 7% of children are under the federal poverty line.

Over 54% of Sunbeam's workers are in executive, professional or management jobs; more than 16% work in sales & service; almost 15% in manufacturing & labor; and nearly 14% in tech support or clerical. Over half of Sunbeam's working residents commute from 15 to 30 minutes one-way; two-thirds drive by themselves in a personal vehicle.

== Jacksonville Beaches ==
The Jacksonville Beaches are a group of towns and communities along the Atlantic Ocean. They are, from north to south, Mayport, Atlantic Beach, Neptune Beach, Jacksonville Beach, and Ponte Vedra Beach. The first four communities are located within Duval County; Atlantic Beach, Neptune Beach, and Jacksonville Beach are incorporated cities that maintain their own municipal governments, while Ponte Vedra Beach, in St. Johns County, is only a CDP without a municipal government.
