= Point La Vista =

Cape in Duval County, Florida, U.S.

Coordinates: 30.280°N 81.664°W

The cape of Point La Vista ("The Cape") is a bluff in Duval County, located on the eastern bank of the St. Johns River, three miles south of downtown Jacksonville, Florida. It is also the name of one of the subdivisions on the cape. This residential community of single-family homes was created during suburban expansion from the mid-1920's through the 1980s on one of the city's most geographically distinct riverfront locations.

The historical boundaries of the cape of Point La Vista date from land grants of the Second Spanish Era (1783–1821). The modern half-loop road of San Jose Blvd. splits off of Hendricks Avenue just after River Oaks Park, the old Oriental Gardens, at Southside United Methodist Church and hugs the pedestrian-friendly contours of the cape for nearly two miles, ending at the Miramar Center, a shopping plaza. The portion of the cape within the old Jacksonville city limits of 1937 overlaps the traditional southern boundary of the San Marco neighborhood. Many places in Duval County are named for families who once owned property at the cape, such as Bowden Road, Shad Road, Sanchez Road, Hendricks Avenue, Philips Highway, and the Hart Bridge.

== Geographic physical details ==
Location: 30.2774620 latitude

-81.6634283 longitude

Physical: Cape

Size: 400+ acres (Confirmed Spanish Land Grants)

GNIS ID#: 289120 (10/19/1979)

Elevation: 20 feet (6.1 meters)

== History ==
Based on archeological evidence of Native American burial mounds, archival documents from the colonial British and Spanish eras, official territorial public land records in the American Library of Congress and private deeds and plats in The Duval County Clerk of Courts office, the Point La Vista cape has been inhabited for centuries. The name, Point La Vista, dates from the government's La Vista triangulation station of 1876, which is no longer in use. The scenic vista from the west-facing cape looks over a wide section of the St. Johns River.

=== Native Americans – The Timucua (estimate AD 300–1250) ===
In 1896, archeologist Clarence Bloomfield Moore excavated four mounds on the cape of Point La Vista - a “low mound” 1/2 mile north of the cape's wharf (exact location unknown) and three more intersecting mounds about a mile south. Human remains and found artifacts date the mounds from the periods St. Johns II (AD 900–1250) and Swift Creek (AD 300–800). An earthenware tobacco pipe and a Weedon Island multi-compartment bowl which were recovered from these sites, are in the curatorial facility of the National Museum of the American Indian in Washington D.C.

=== British Era Colonists (1763–1783) – Loyalists During American Revolution ===
Two expansive 18th Century British era plantations were at the Point La Vista cape during the 20-year period in which Jacksonville, then known as Cowford, was part of East Florida, the 14th Colony of Great Britain. English planters and their enslaved African workforce developed self-sufficient operations to provide crops for commercial purposes, such as indigo, rice, citrus and cotton; and corn, potatoes, and other vegetables to feed themselves and their livestock.

1. Orange Bluff Plantation – Joshua Yallowley purchased the 500-acre tract in 1773 and described it as "100 acres of good cypress swamp with great potential for growing rice, and 400 acres of scrub oak and yellow pine land". Four slaves cleared a homestead for Yallowley and his mother on the banks of the river. The plantation presumably was named for its main export, orange juice. Yallowley and his uncle, Captain John Fairlamb, oversaw construction of the King's Road from St. Augustine to the Cowford Ferry, completed in 1774. Yallowley retreated to the Bahamas after the American Revolution.
2. Jericho / Chichester Plantations – Jericho was formed from land grants to Thomas and Kay Caudrey in the early 1770s which ran from the south (upriver) side of the cape along the riverbank to today's New Rose Creek near Lakewood Shopping Center. They maintained a thriving family farm. James Penman purchased their tract in 1774 to gain water access for his thousand plus acre plantation named "Jericho." Of historical significance, in the National Archives of Great Britain at Kew, is a detailed listing of assets, including human resources, a “List of Negroes by Family” which shows the names, skillsets and monetary values of the enslaved Africans of Jericho, when sold to Denys Rolle, a member of Parliament, who renamed it “Chichester”.

After the American Revolution, the British returned East Florida to Spanish rule. English planters departed the cape with their enslaved Africans or took an Oath of Allegiance to the Spanish Crown and submitted petitions for confirmation of their public land grants.

=== Second Spanish Era Colonists (1784–1821) – to American Territory and Statehood (1821–1845) ===
Two plantations were formed on the cape from Spanish Land Grants: William Craig (1815); Isaac Hendricks (1827) and Farquhar Bethune (1827).

==== Red Bank Plantation ====
“Banco Encamado” or “Red Bank” was a 450-acre land grant to Francis Flora in 1793, later sold to William Craig, who then sold part of it to Isaiah Hart, the founder of Jacksonville. Hart sold it to Isaac Hendricks. In 1829, Hendricks’ son-in-law Albert Gallatin Philips bought most of the old Red Bank land grant and built the white brick plantation home in 1853, still standing at 1230 Greenridge Rd. Philips Highway, U.S.1, was named for Albert's son Judge Henry Bethune Philips in 1934 to thank him for his efforts as chairman of the State Road Department. In 1972, Red Bank was placed on the National Register of Historic Places

==== New Ross Plantation ====
Farquhar Bethune acquired the 145 acre property called "Santo Domingo" in 1811 from Maria del Carmen Hill, widow of Francisco X. Sanchez of St. Augustine. Bethune built New Ross Plantation on the location which crosses today's subdivisions of Point La Vista, Miramar and the riverfront streets south to Worth Drive East. During the Patriot War of 1812–1814, while North Florida was still a Spanish territory, an American militia unit crossed the St. Mary's River and attempted a coup in Florida. While retreating by boat on the St. Johns River, the American militia went ashore and burned New Ross Plantation down in retaliation for Bethune's loyalty to Spain. Bethune survived by staying in the town of Fernandina. He eventually returned to the burned down plantation and rebuilt it, including a sugar mill. His preserved diary of life on New Ross Plantation provides an historical record of its daily activities, including thermometer readings. In 1852, Solomon S. Shad III bought New Ross and renamed it. No known buildings or remnants remain from the era of New Ross Plantation although "New Rose Creek" at Lakewood Shopping Center appears on older city maps as "New Ross Creek".

For decades following the American Civil War (April 12, 1861 – May 9, 1865), and the emancipation of enslaved Africans, much of the old agricultural land on the cape served as small family farms or was parceled off for sale by plantation heirs.

=== Modern Era – Suburban Subdivisions on the Cape (20th Century) ===
The two mile curved half-loop cape road of San Jose Blvd., that runs parallel to the river, passes by 20 plus separately-platted subdivisions created on the cape in the 20th Century. The smallest subdivisions are only one street long or appear as fragments developed at different times within larger neighborhoods, as is the case with Colonial Manor and Miramar Terrace.

==== Northern Part of the Cape ====
The William Craig and Isaac Hendricks land grants encompass much of the original 450-acre Red Bank Plantation, with the 1853 white brick mansion at its heart on Greenridge Road. Within the original plantation's boundaries lie today's 20th century subdivisions: Granada (1925), Colonial Manor (1935–1940), much of Miramar Terrace (1926–1947), and the smaller subdivisions of Waterman Estates (1947); Old Oak Terrace (1927); South Riverside Section B– (Inwood Terrace –1914); Edenwold (1984); Oriental Gardens (1955) and Brookwood Terrace (1937). Colonial Manor, developed by San Marco's developers Stockton, Whatley and Davin, is a sprawling subdivision that includes by design three city parks: Colonial Manor Park (“The Duck Pond”) with its water fowl, fountains, and remote-control boat hobbyists; Greenridge Road Park on a creek that flows directly into the St. Johns River; and on the Hendricks Avenue outskirts, Mickey King Park. A city pocket park sits on the riverbank at the end of Inwood Terrace.

Hendricks Elementary School, founded in 1942, serving over 600 students from Pre-Kindergarten to Grade 5, with their mascot Henry the Eagle, is the only public school on the cape.

==== Tip of the Cape and South ====
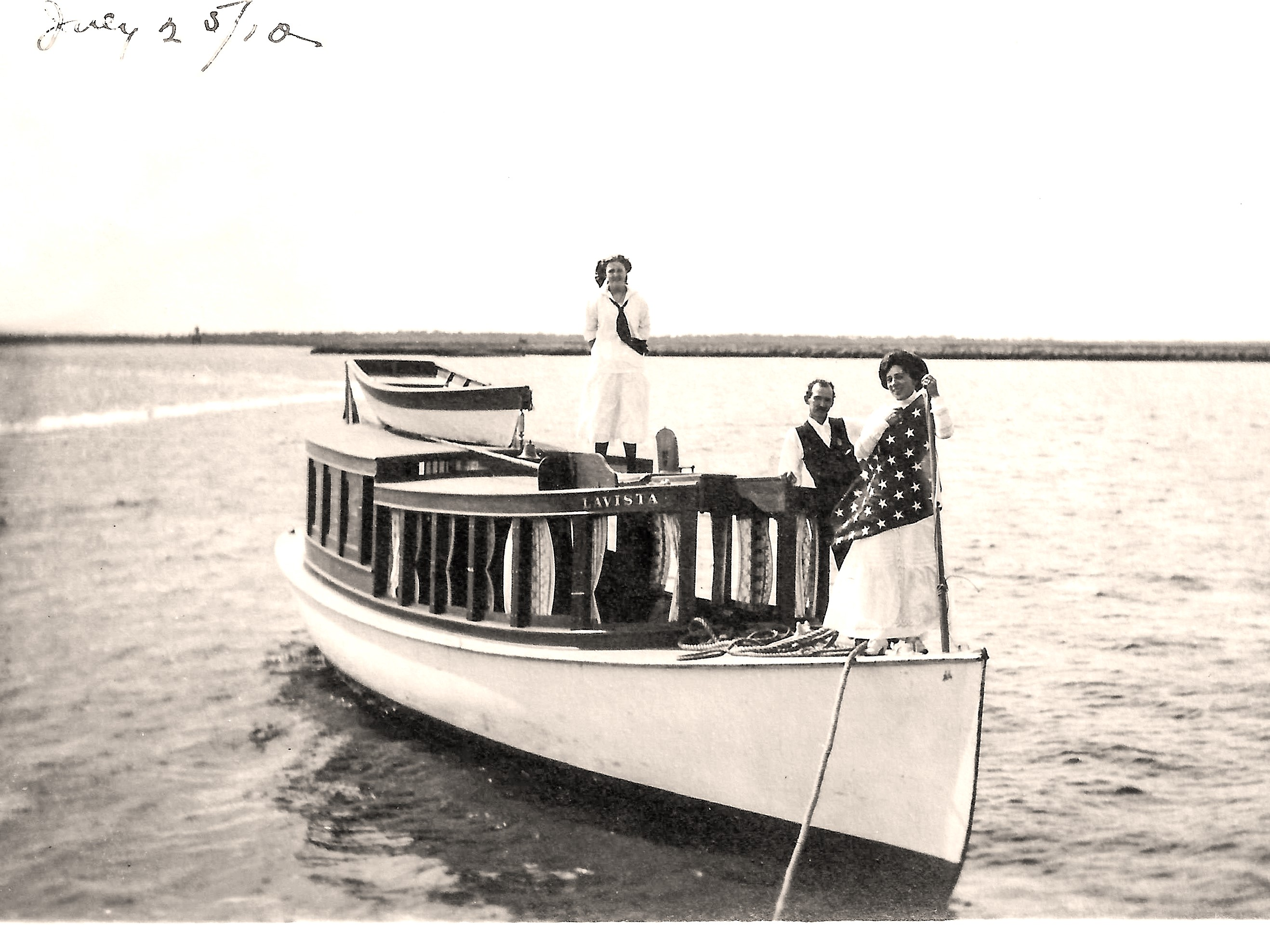
Mae, Fleming & Flora Bowden on La Vista (1910) Courtesy Dorothy Alvarez

The Farquhar Bethune Grant, on the tip of the cape and south, is now the location of the neighborhoods of Point La Vista, the rest of Miramar Terrace and ten riverfront street-sized subdivisions to Miramar Center which fall within the New Ross Plantation boundaries. In 1904, a few years after Jacksonville's "Great Fire", R. Fleming Bowden, Sheriff and Tax Collector, and a descendant of the pioneering Hogans and Bowden families, purchased 140 acres of undeveloped land known as "Point La Vista". For over 50 years, the Bowden family lived on an estate there. Flora Genth Bowden, the Sheriff's wife, was a founder and president of the Jacksonville Humane Society. One of their African-American servants, Shack Thomas, a former slave, gave an autobiographical field interview in the Works Project Administration’s (WPA’s) oral history “Slave Narratives”, giving a glimpse into the life experiences of formerly enslaved African workers. In his 1930 interview, Thomas, by then a centenarian, recounted his earliest memories of living on a plantation in West Florida owned by a "Mr. Jim Campbell" where they grew corn, peanuts, cotton and potatoes. Mr. Campbell was described as "moderate" and Thomas said, "the most he would give us was a switching and most of the time we could pray our way out of that". After freedom and a move to Jacksonville, Thomas said he worked for many people, but "I worked for Mr. Bowden the longest". A private Bowden family scrapbook depicts turn-of-the-century life on the forested cape as filled with hunting and fishing, picnics and leisurely boating trips on their small steamer the "La Vista". Except for a few artesian wells, nothing remains of the turn-of-the-century Bowden estate in today's Point La Vista or Granada subdivisions.

Sale of the Bowden estate resulted in the following developments:

- Granada (1925) – Lawrence Howard created the cape's grandest 75-acre neighborhood. It features upscale Mediterranean-style, Georgian brick and ranch homes on generous-sized lots with oak, pine and traditional southern landscaping. The centerpiece of the neighborhood is Granada Park. The earliest Mediterranean-style homes date from the mid-1920's.
- Point La Vista (1965), which sits on the curve at the site of the old Bowden family estate, was created by Joseph Davin of State Investment Company. It features mid-century ranch and custom-built homes on a contoured cul-de-sac with underground utilities and city sidewalks throughout.
- Miramar Terrace (Created from 1926 to 1947) encompasses the area east of San Jose Blvd. It is a charming neighborhood of brick bungalows that culminates in the shops and restaurants of Miramar Center.
- The sale of other Bowden riverfront property resulted in two additional street-long subdivisions, South Granada (1951), and Old Grove Manor (1954). The riverfront mansion of Old Grove Manor was built in 1924 by state Senator William C. Hodges. Rio Lindo Drive, an unregistered subdivision, was created from a private road on the banks of Greenridge Park.

South of this, a proposed neighborhood of 1911 called Ives & Patterson's "Hollywood" was subsequently subdivided into the following streets: Great Oaks Lane (1941); Philips Manor (1973); Heaven Trees (1961); Gadsden Court (1941); Silverwood Lane; Kelnepa Drive (1925); San Jose Lane (1945); San Jose Terrace/Landover Drive (1950); and Worth Drive (1950).

The modern suburbs of the Point La Vista cape end at Miramar Center where San Jose Blvd. and Hendricks Avenue converge at the south end. From the time of the Timucua through colonial Europeans until the 21st century, the cape has been a strategically located and inviting place for settlement on the banks of the St. Johns River.
