= Harry Botts Jr. =

American politician

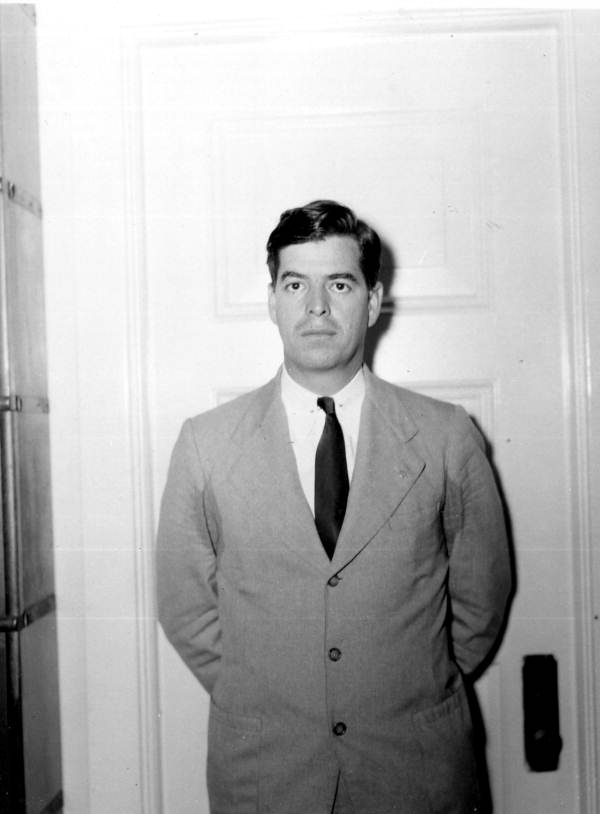
- Botts in 1947

Member of the Florida House of Representatives from Escambia County
- In office 1946–1950

Personal details
- Born: January 18, 1913 South Jacksonville, Florida, U.S.
- Died: January 17, 2008 (aged 94)
- Party: Democratic
- Education: University of Florida; Cumberland University

Harry Botts Jr. (January 18, 1913 – January 17, 2008) was an American politician. He served as a Democratic member of the Florida House of Representatives.

== Life and career ==
Botts was born in South Jacksonville, Florida. He attended the University of Florida and Cumberland University.

Botts served in the Florida House of Representatives from 1946 to 1950.

Botts died on January 17, 2008, at the age of 94.
