= Villa Alexandria =

Coordinates: 30.2994°N 81.6545°W

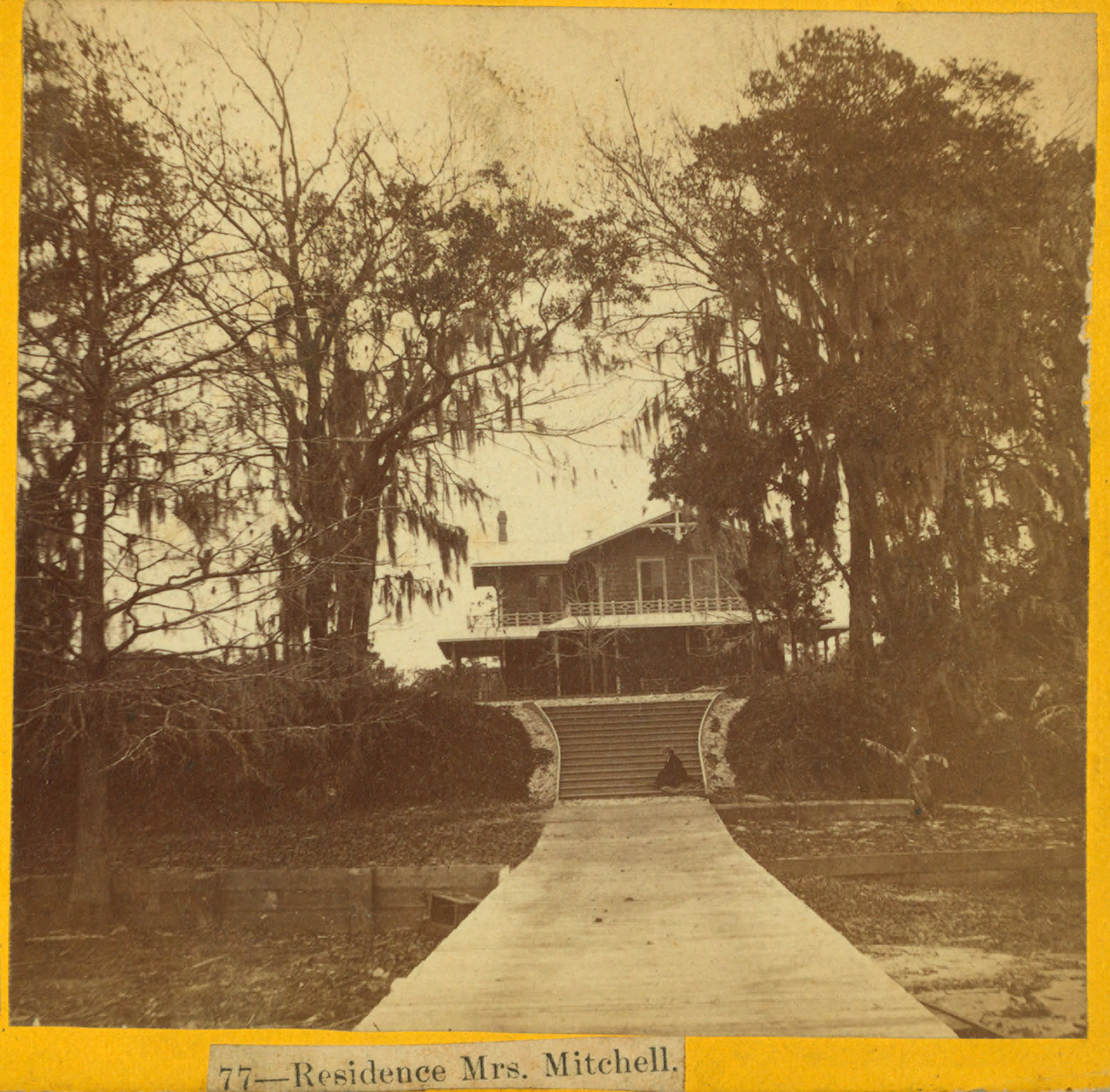
- Interactive map of the Villa Alexandria area

General information
- Classification: plantation house
- Location: San Marco, Jacksonville, Florida, U.S.
- Named for: Alexander Mitchell
- Completed: 1870s
- Owner: Martha Reed Mitchell

Technical details
- Grounds: 140 acres (57 ha)

Design and construction
- Known for: oldest oak tree in Florida

Villa Alexandria is a former plantation house in the San Marco neighborhood of Jacksonville, Florida. It was built in the 1870s by Alexander Mitchell and his wife, Martha. There were 140 acres (57 ha) of grounds of which 40 acres (16 ha) were under cultivation. In the 1920s, Villa Alexandria's gardens became part of "The Arbors", a residential property.

== History ==
Soon after the Civil War, while visiting Florida, Mrs. Mitchell found a location she liked for a winter home. She and her husband purchased a tract of land on the St. Johns River 3 miles (4.8 km) from Jacksonville the Alexandria. The Mitchell home was distinguished for hospitality, characterized as one of the finest and best kept-up places in Florida.

== Grounds ==
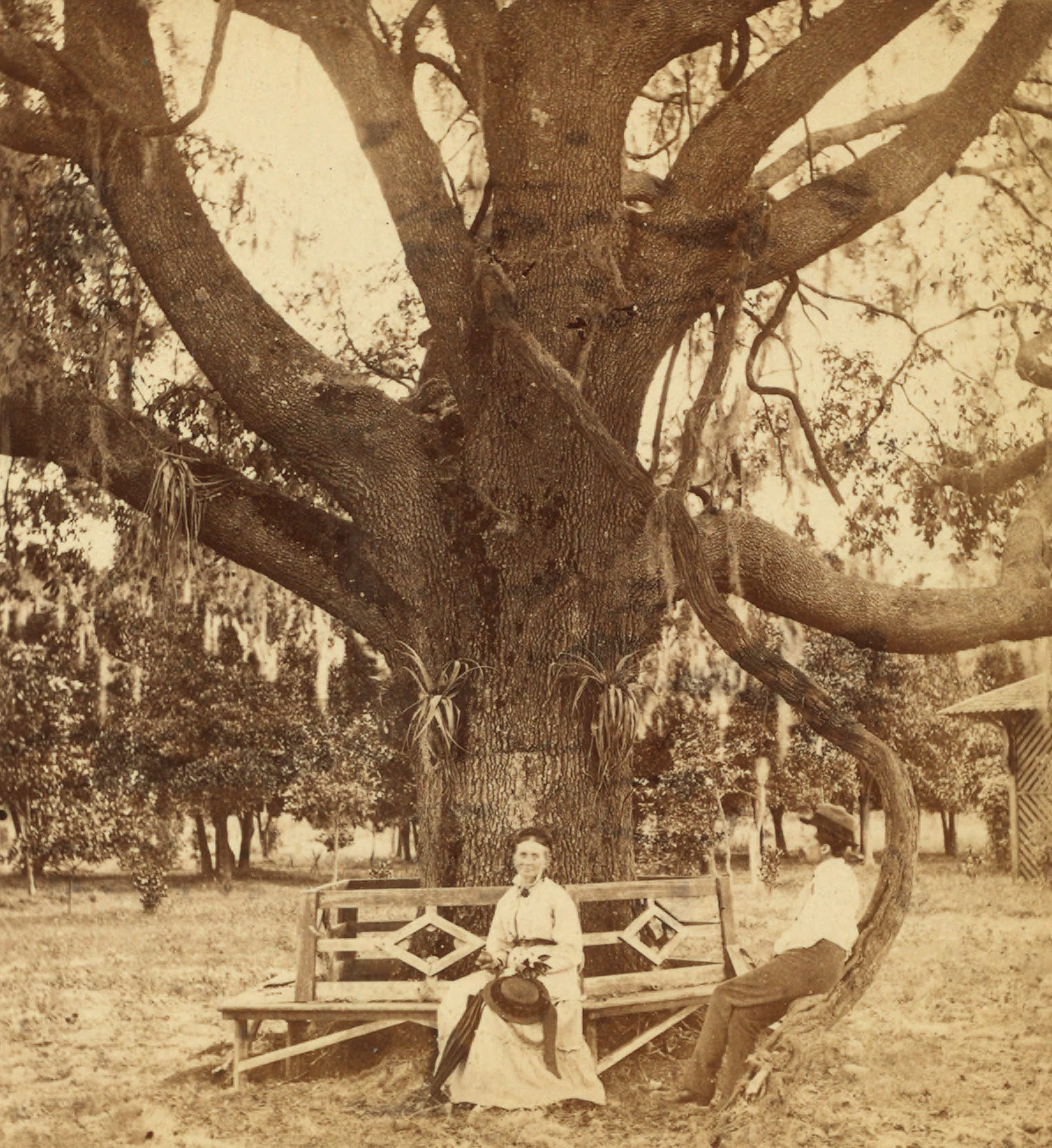
The largest oak in Florida, on Mrs. Mitchell's grounds.

The house was surrounded by broad piazzas. The grounds were studded with summer-houses and grottos and on the river front stood a pier and boathouse. A beach road made of shells brought from the mouth of the river extended for some 100 yards (91 m) on each side of the pier. Just above this beach a Cherokee rose extended about 300 yards (270 m). A private road connected the estate to the King's Road. Visitors' carriages were not allowed to pass beyond the two gates on the road. This area was generally known as "Craig's Cove" and had been part of a Spanish land grant.

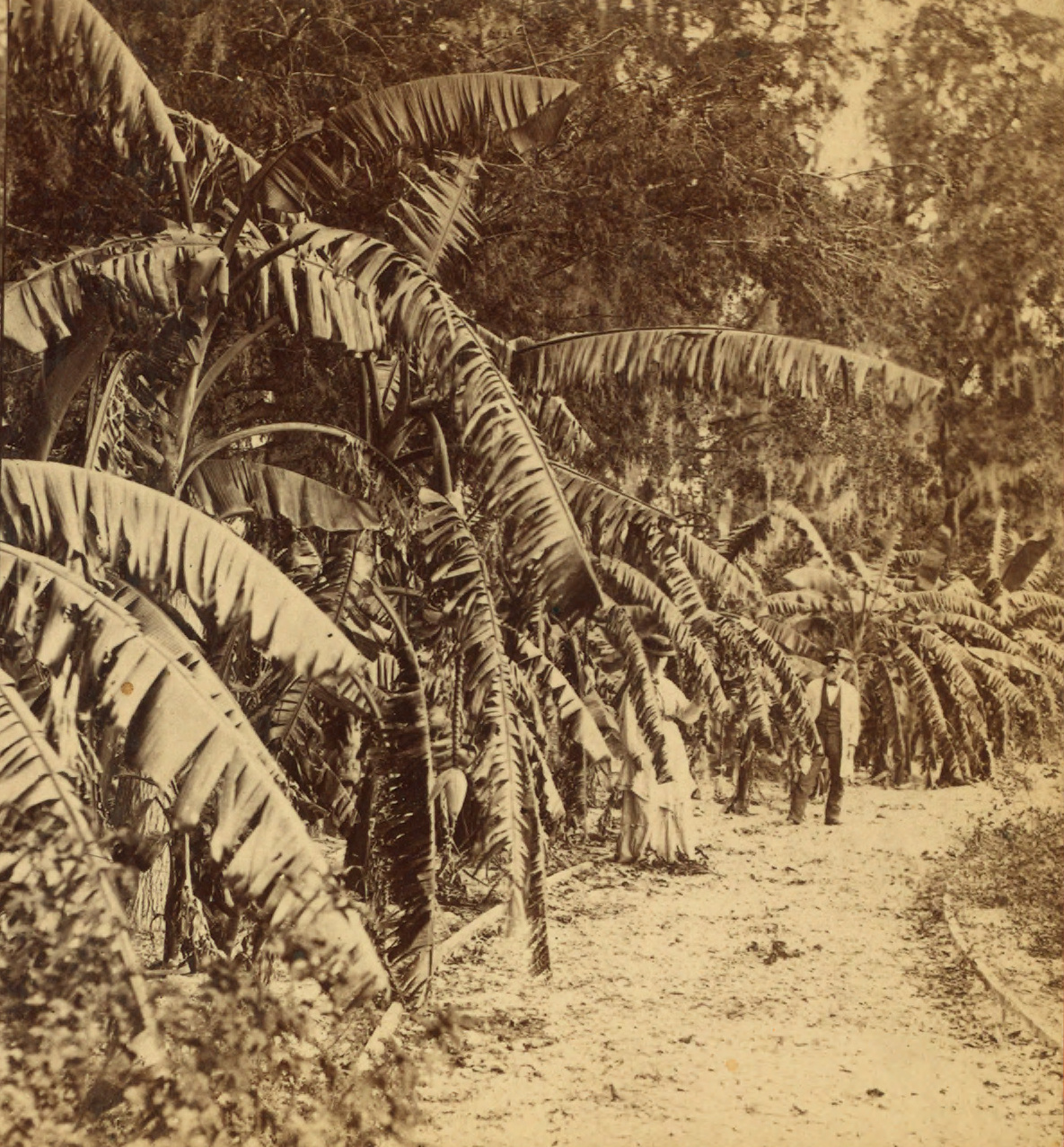
Banana Promenade

The grounds contained lemon, banana, olive, plum, pear, peach, and apricot, English walnut, Spanish chestnut, hickory and pecan-trees, 2,000 orange trees, date and cabbage palms, Chinese and Japanese cane, tea-plant, as well as camelias and roses. Among the rare trees were camphor and cinnamon from Ceylon. Bamboos grown included the sacred tree of India and five varieties of cane. All the well-known varieties of the flowers of the temperate and the tropical zones also grew.
