= Brooklyn (Jacksonville) =

Neighborhood of Jacksonville, Florida

- Neighborhood
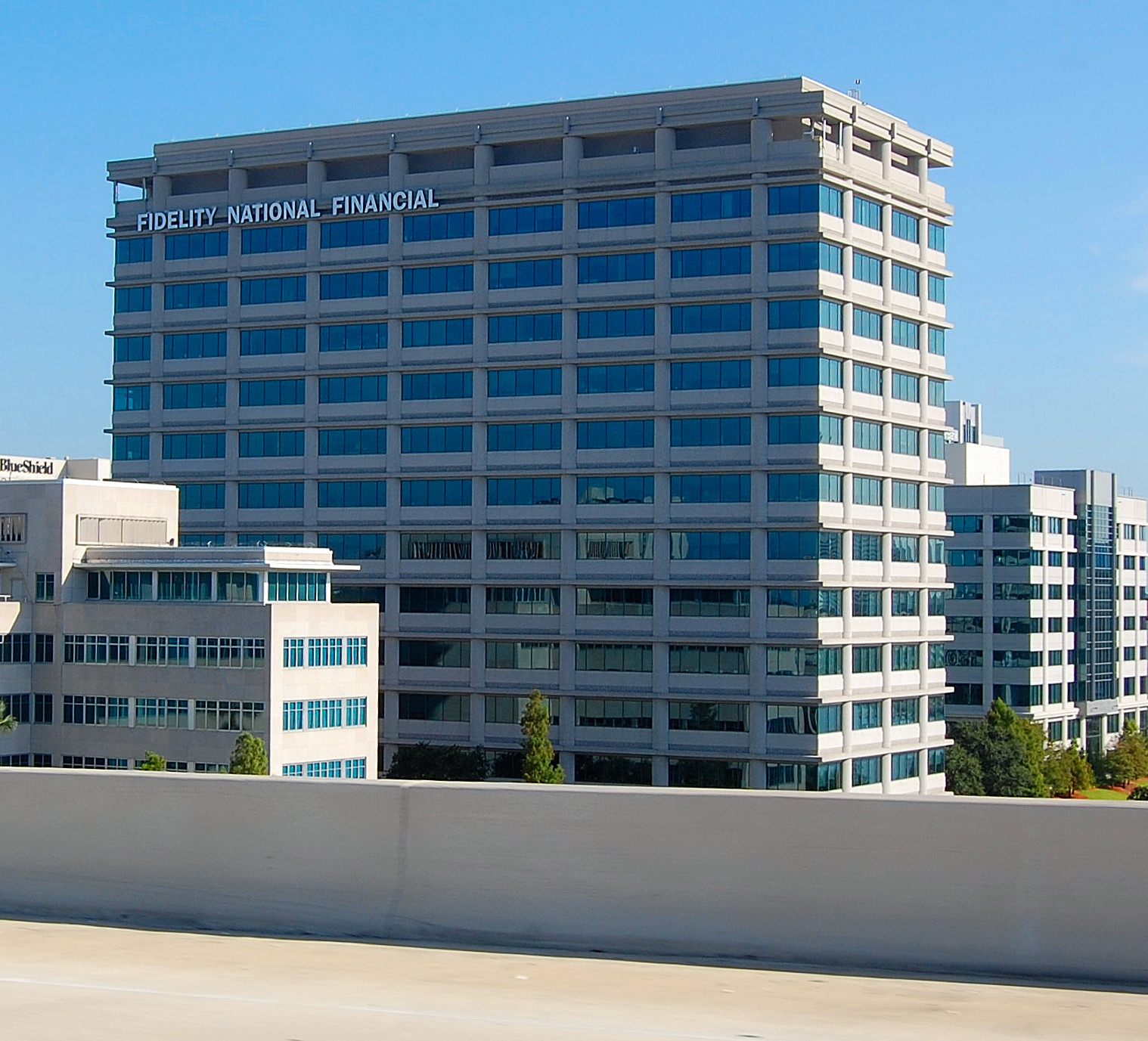
- Fidelity National Financial located on Riverside Avenue in Brooklyn.

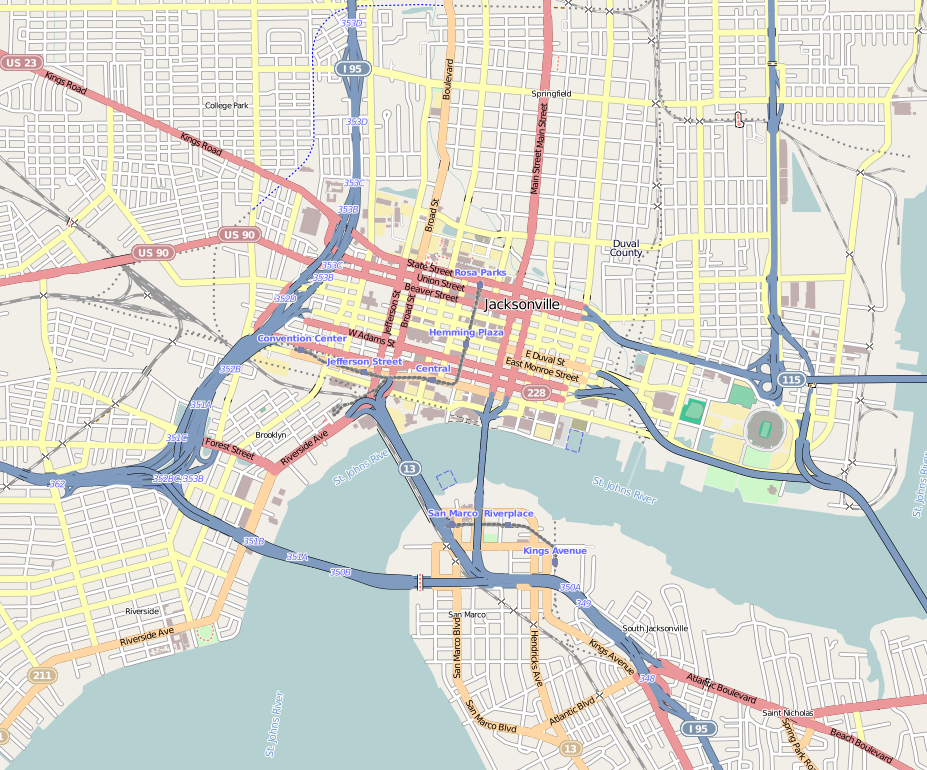
- Location within Central Jacksonville
- Coordinates: 30°19′25″N 81°40′28″W
- Country: United States
- State: Florida
- City: Jacksonville

Area
  - Total: 0.502 sq mi (1.30 km^{2})
  - Land: 0.502 sq mi (1.30 km^{2})
- Elevation: 20 ft (6.1 m)

Population (2008)
  - Total: 325
  - Density: 647/sq mi (250/km^{2})
- Time zone: UTC-5 (Eastern (EST))
  - Summer (DST): UTC-4 (EDT)
- ZIP Code: 32202, 32204
- Area code: 904
- GNIS feature ID: 279437

Brooklyn is a neighborhood of Jacksonville, Florida, considered part of the downtown area. Originally a residential suburb, commercial uses became prominent during the 20th century, particularly along the St. Johns River and Riverside Avenue, and the area became included in Jacksonville's central business district. In the 21st century, it has become the site of mixed-use developments.

== Location ==
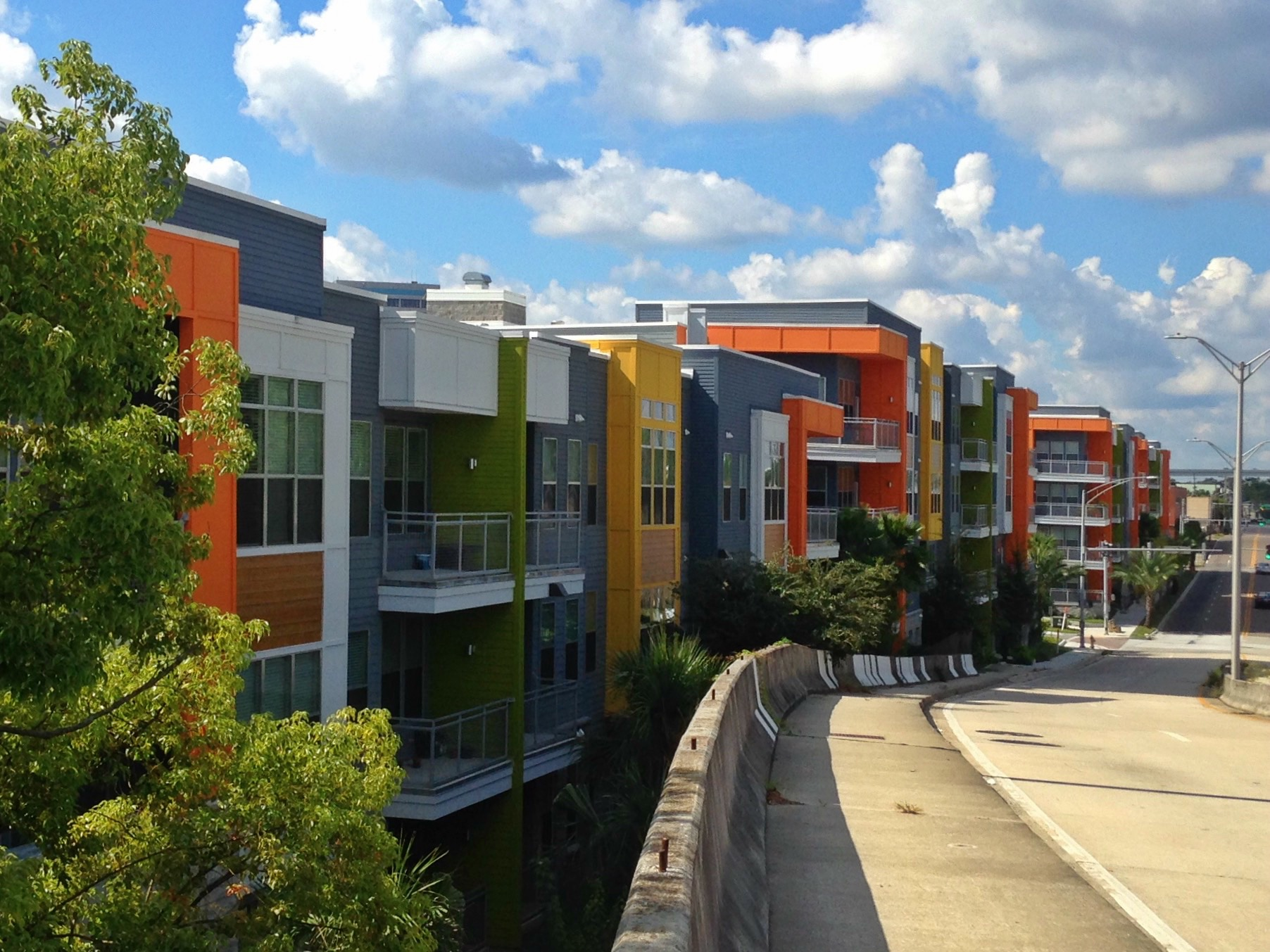
Rapid redevelopment in Brooklyn has transformed once blighted areas of the neighborhood.

Brooklyn is located along the St. Johns River, south of Lavilla and the Downtown Core, and immediately north of Riverside. It is roughly bounded by McCoy's Creek and the CSX Railroad lines to the north, the river to the east, and Interstate 95 to the south and west. Brooklyn has come to be considered part of Jacksonville's greater downtown.

== History ==
The area was first settled in 1801, when Phillip Dell started a large 800-acre plantation there known as Dell's Bluff. Dell's Bluff changed hands several times before the American Civil War. After the war it was acquired by Miles Price, who sold the southern half of the property to be developed as the suburb of Riverside. The northern section he retained and developed himself as Brooklyn.

It appears that Price gave Brooklyn its name, but it is not known why a former staunch Confederate would have chosen a name so associated with the New York borough of Brooklyn. Price's Brooklyn was initially a residential suburb, growing quickly with the establishment of a streetcar line. The area held a population of 1,000 and a few hundred homes and mansions. African-American former soldiers (known as Buffalo Soldiers) lived in the neighborhood, and one of their houses still stands, though in disrepair. In 1887 Brooklyn and several other suburbs were annexed by Jacksonville. It remained primarily residential into the 20th century, but it eventually developed into a commercial and industrial area with the increasing use of the railway. In the 1950s, Interstate 95 over the Fuller Warren Bridge cut off the historically black neighborhood. In the late 20th century, a number of commercial skyscrapers and other building were constructed along the river and Riverside Avenue.

Subsequently, a rift emerged between the office-centered part of the neighborhood on the river and the traditional neighborhood further inland. As such, the city developed plans in the late 20th and early 21st century to reintroduce residential zoning and mixed-use development.

Gentrification is affecting the long-term residents of Brooklyn.
