= Theatre Jacksonville =

- Little Theatre
- U.S. National Register of Historic Places
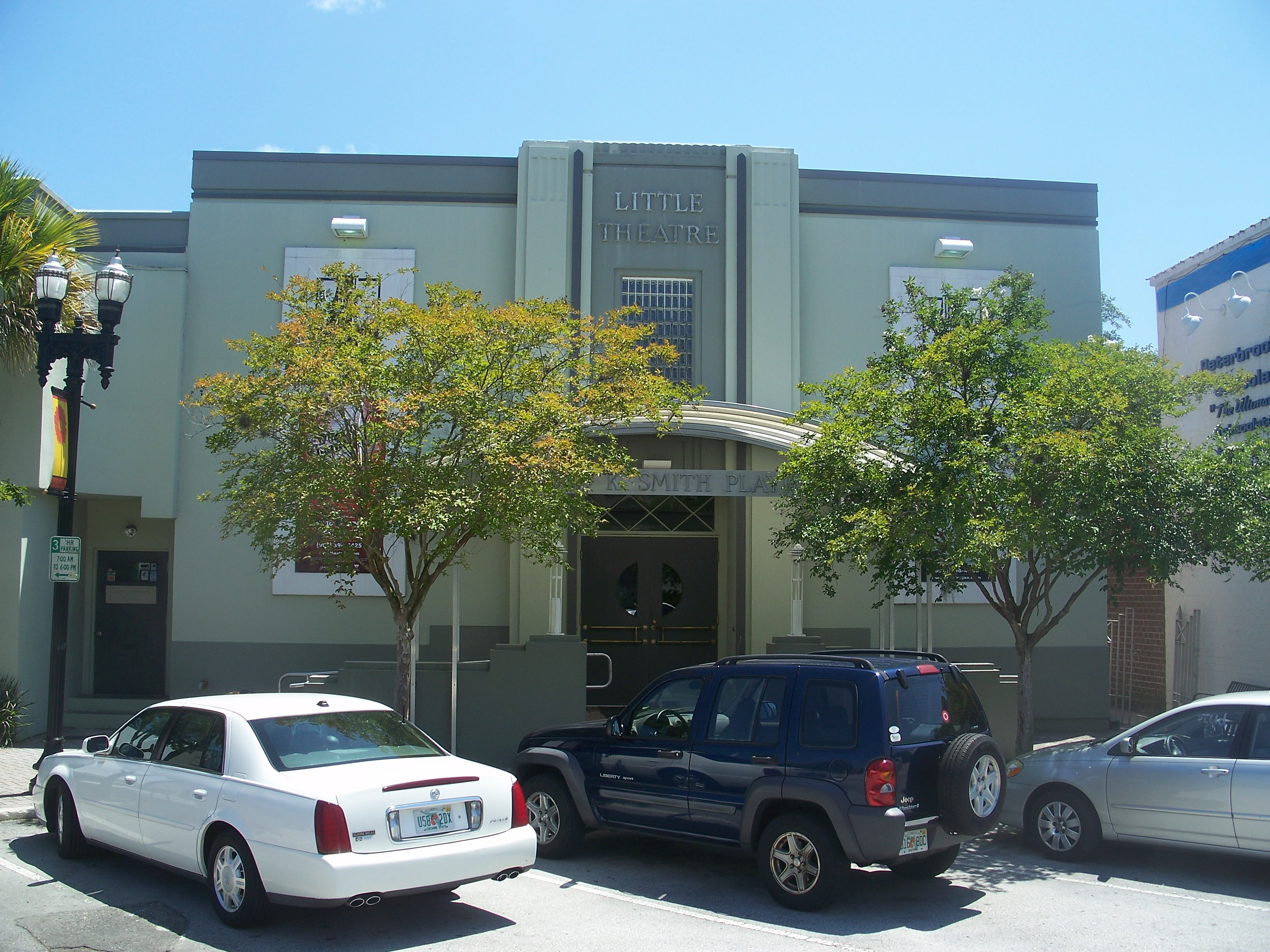
- Theatre Jacksonville in 2011

- Location within Florida Location within the United States
- Location: Jacksonville
- Coordinates: 30°19′51.86″N 81°40′8.01″W
- Built: 1938
- Architect: Ivan H. Smith
- Architectural style: Art Deco
- NRHP reference No.: 91000895
- Added to NRHP: July 12, 1991

Theatre Jacksonville is a community theater based in Jacksonville, Florida, United States (Duval County). It is the oldest continuously-operating community theater in the state of Florida, and one of the oldest in the United States. Its building, also known as the Little Theatre, was added to the National Register of Historic Places in 1991.

== History ==
The Little Theatre company was founded at Jacksonville, Florida, in 1919 and then changed its name to "Little Theatre of Jacksonville" in 1926. Cigar magnate Carl Swisher financed a new building in the San Marco neighborhood (2032 San Marco Boulevard) in 1927. It took until January 4, 1938 for the first premiere to take place, namely Boy meets Girl.

Logo

In 1969, because of its recent growth as a performance venue, the Little Theatre of Jacksonville became Theatre Jacksonville. Mayor Hans Tanzler issued a proclamation naming Theatre Jacksonville as Jacksonville's official theater.

On July 12, 1991, the Little Theatre building was added to the U.S. National Register of Historic Places. The $500,000 Harold K. Smith Playhouse Endowment for facility maintenance was established in June, 1997. In October, 2000 the theater facade renovation was completed and the facility was formally dedicated as the Harold K. Smith Playhouse.
