= Red Bank Plantation House =

- Red Bank Plantation
- U.S. National Register of Historic Places
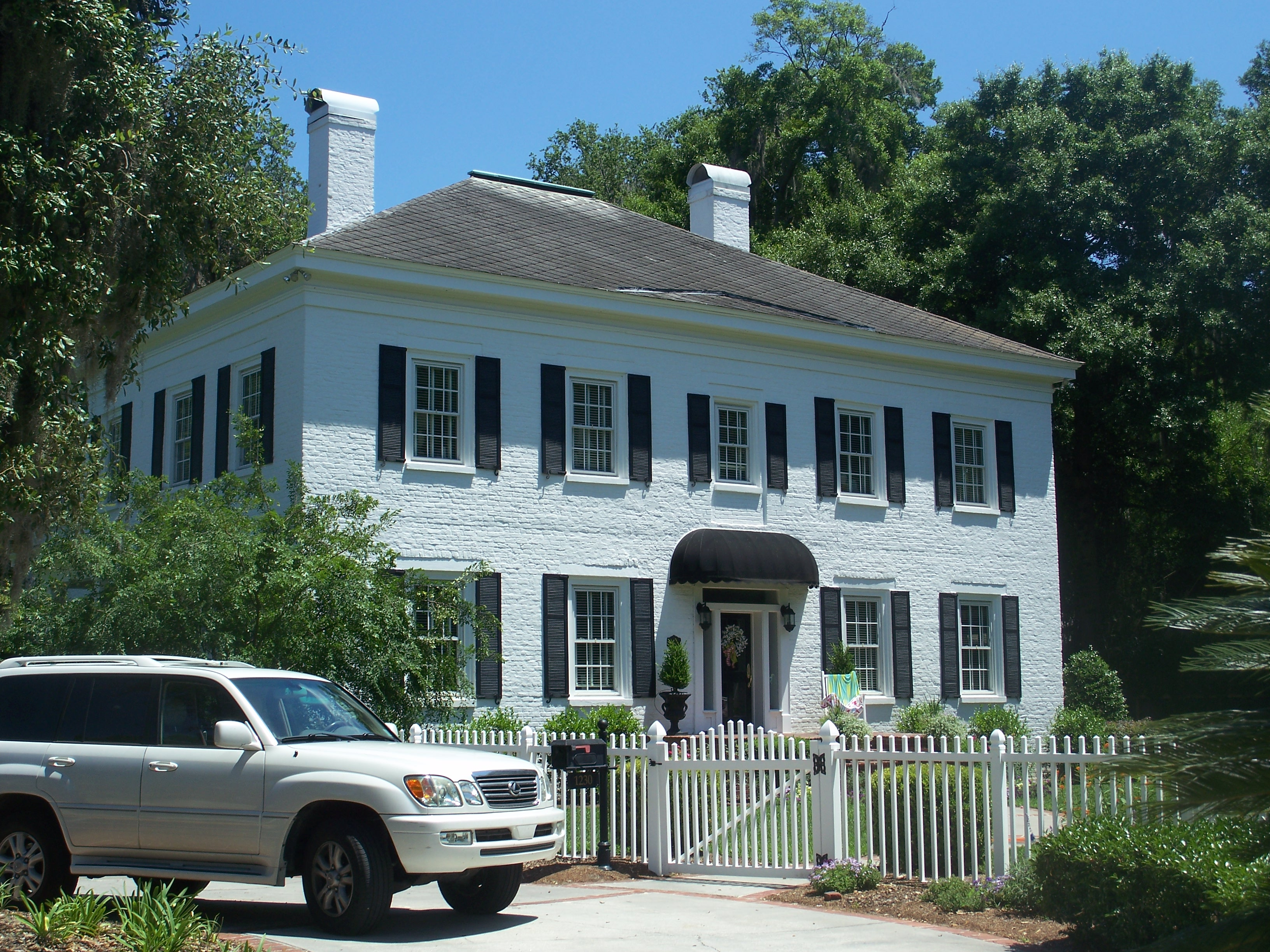
- Front and side of the house

- Location within Florida Location within the United States
- Location: 1230 Greenridge Rd., Jacksonville, Florida
- Coordinates: 30°17′2″N 81°39′9″W
- Area: Less than 1 acre (0.40 ha)
- Built: 1854
- Architectural style: Georgian
- NRHP reference No.: 72000311
- Added to NRHP: October 18, 1972

The Red Bank Plantation House is a historic former plantation house in Jacksonville, Florida. Built in 1854 as the main house for the Red Bank plantation, it is now a private residence within the Colonial Manor area of Jacksonville's San Marco neighborhood. It is located at 1230 Greenridge Road, and was added to the National Register of Historic Places on October 18, 1972.

== Red Bank Plantation ==
Red Bank Plantation dates to the 18th century. The name was in use by 1793, during Florida's second Spanish period, when Francisco Flora owned the property. In 1799 William Craig acquired the land, and it subsequently passed through the hands of several powerful landholders: Isaiah Hart, Isaac Hendricks, and finally Albert Gallatin Philips. Philips developed the 450-acre slave plantation on the site. Philips married Isaac Hendricks' daughter Margaret; this, combined with Hendricks' marriage to Elizabeth Hudnall, another large landowner, meant that by 1850 most land in the area was connected by marriage. Philips built Red Bank Plantation House beginning in 1854.

After the American Civil War ended the plantation era, the Philips family remained on the property, though they sold most of the outlying land for residential development after Philips' death in 1873. The area became absorbed into the growing community of South Jacksonville, now known as San Marco. A small settlement known as Philips grew up around the train station east of the house. During the 1920s the remainder of the land was platted for the South Riverside and Colonial Manor developments.

== House ==
Albert Philip's first plantation house at Red Bank was a wood-frame structure that burned down after a few years. This caused him to build the current, brick house from 1854 to 1857. The two-story house was made from red clay bricks hand-made on the property, and was at the time reportedly the only brick structure between Jacksonville and Palatka.

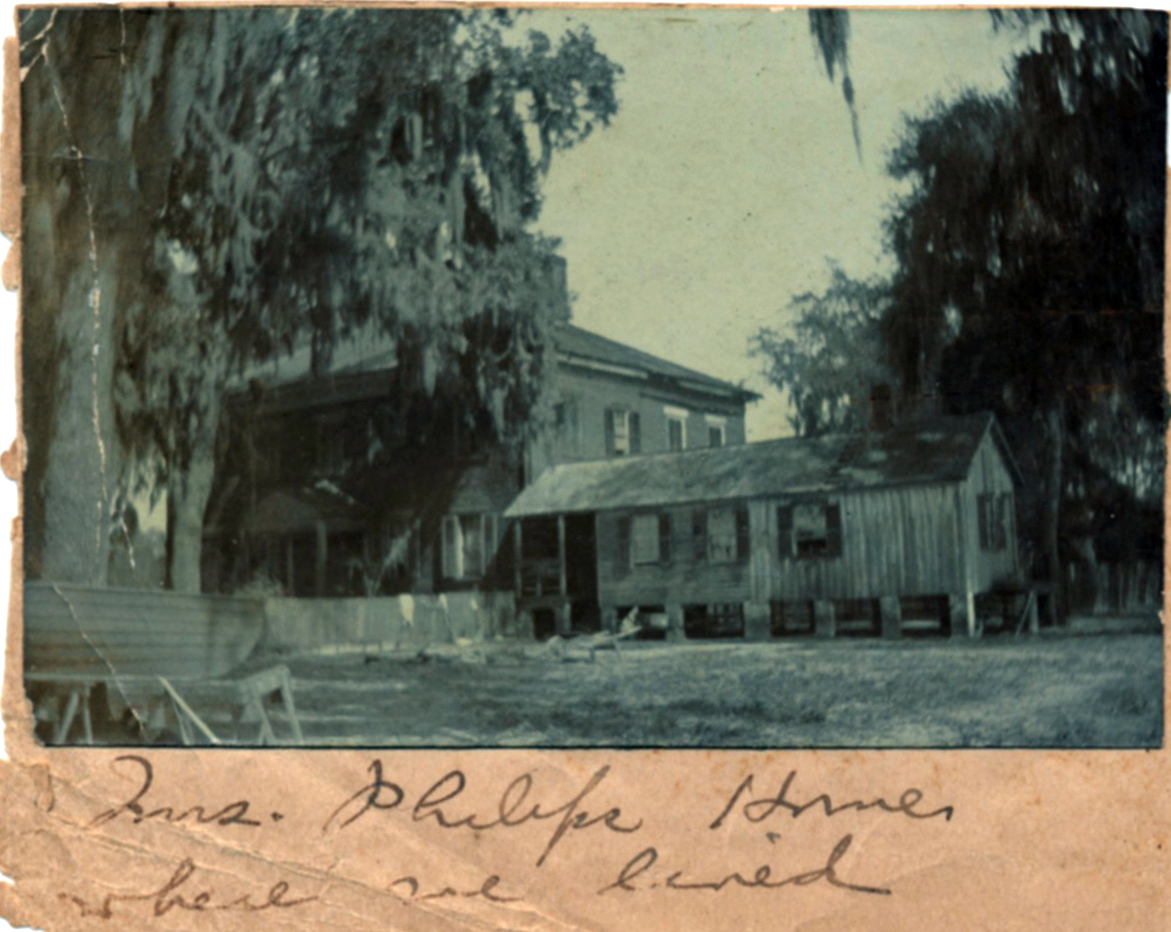
Red Bank in an undated family photo from the early 1900s.

After Philips died in 1873 his son Matthew Philips continued living in the house. The house remained in use as the former plantation land was sold off for residential development. In the 1920s, as the Colonial Manor development grew around the house, the house's front door faced the wrong direction from Greenridge Road. It was moved to the other side of a house and a small porch was added. The building was converted into a restaurant, first known as the Candlewick Inn and then Johnson's Chicken House, but returned to residential use in 1937. It is now the second oldest residence in Jacksonville still in use as such. It was added to the National Register of Historic Places on October 18, 1972.
