= San Marco (Jacksonville) =

Neighborhood of Jacksonville, Florida

- Neighborhood of Jacksonville
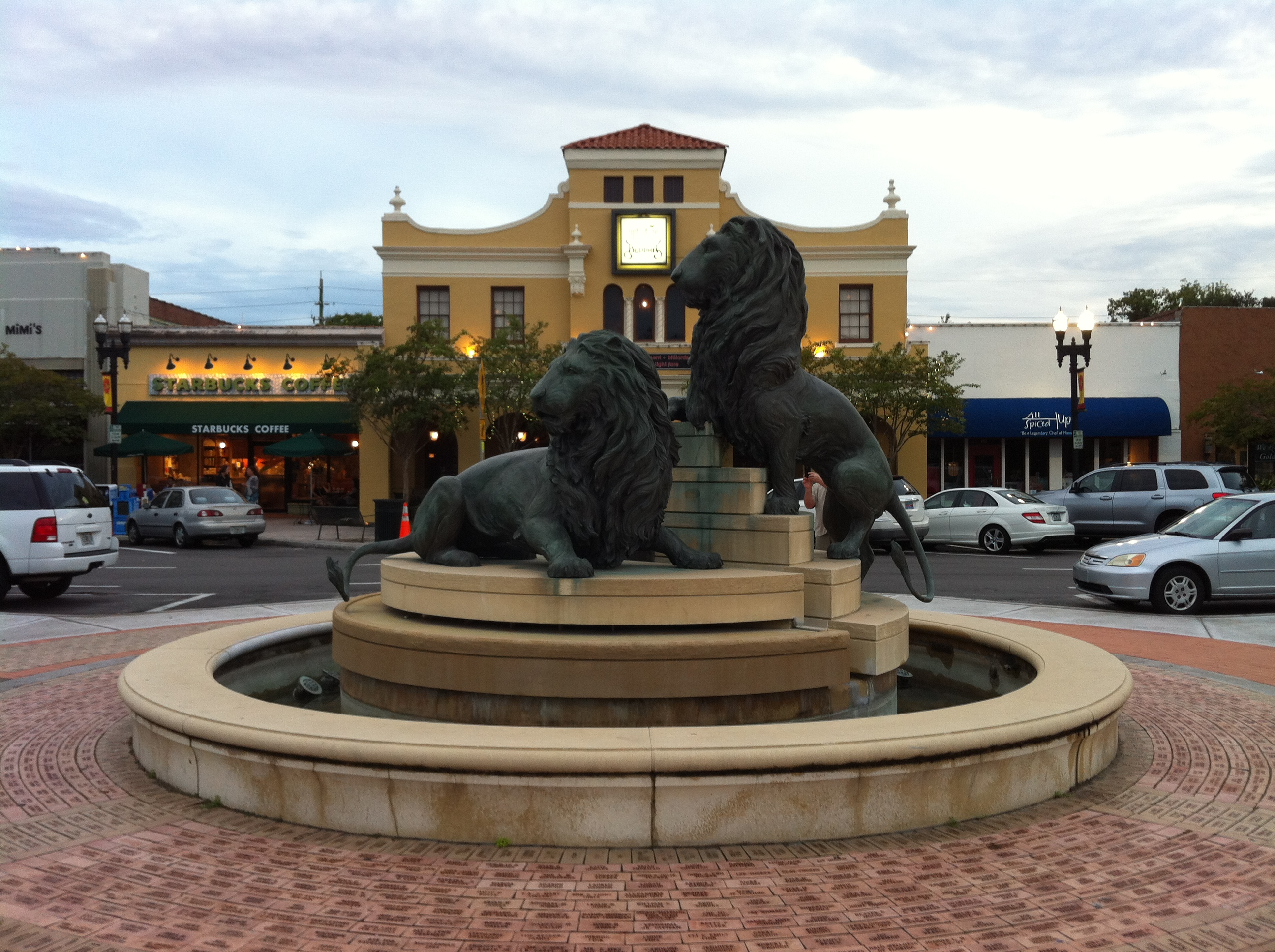
- Lion statues in San Marco Square

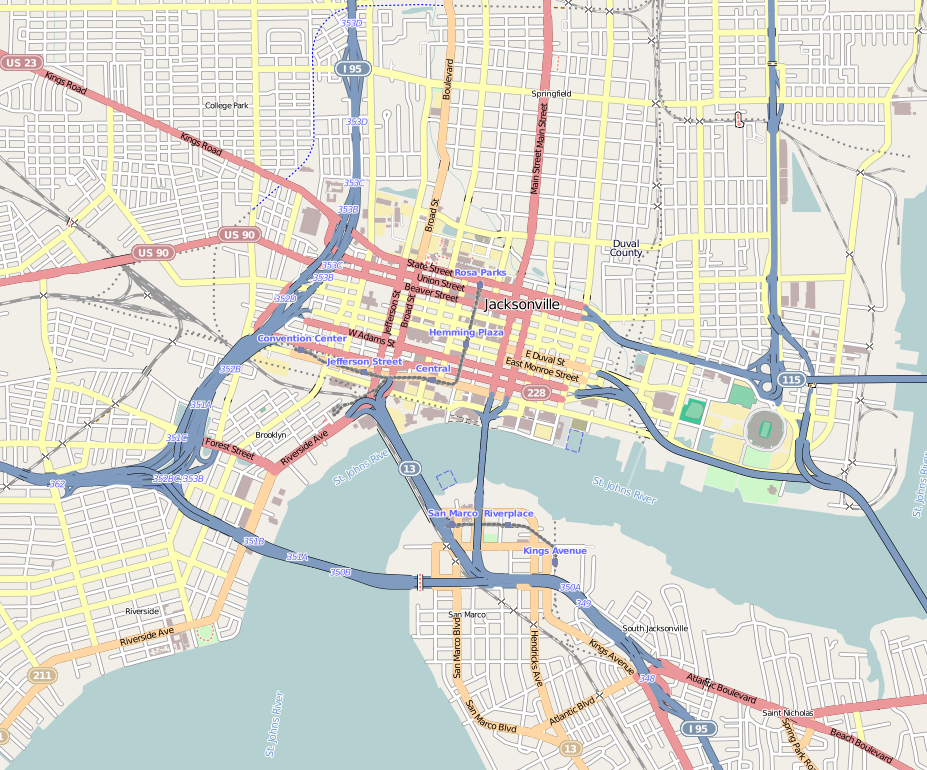
- Location within Central Jacksonville
- Coordinates: 30°18′14″N 81°39′15″W

Government
  - City Council: Lori N. Boyer; Warren Jones
  - Florida House: Reggie Fullwood; Charles McBurney
  - Florida Senate: Aaron Bean; Audrey Gibson
  - U.S. House: John Rutherford (R)
- ZIP Code: 32207
- Area code(s): 904, 324

San Marco is a neighborhood of Jacksonville, Florida, United States. South of Downtown across the St. Johns River, the neighborhood was formerly the independent city of South Jacksonville until it was annexed by Jacksonville in 1932. The neighborhood is primarily residential, with an integrated commercial sector known as San Marco Square.

The South Jacksonville community emerged after the American Civil War and incorporated in 1907. It saw its greatest growth after the Acosta Bridge was completed in 1921, connecting the neighborhood to Downtown Jacksonville. This period included the construction of the original San Marco development, which eventually gave its name to the area as a whole. Since the 1990s, the neighborhood has seen several historic preservation and redevelopment projects. It is home to fourteen city parks, several schools and other amenities.

== Geography ==
"San Marco" originally designated only one development within South Jacksonville, but the name is now used for much of the former city's territory, south and east of the St. Johns River across from downtown Jacksonville. The place name "South Jacksonville" or Southside has similarly evolved, and now signifies a much larger area of southeastern Duval County. The neighborhood's borders are not official and have changed over time. The boundaries used by the San Marco Preservation Society are Interstate 95 to the north, Philips Highway to the east, Greenridge Road to the south, and the St. Johns River to the west. The area along the riverbank north of I-95, known as the Southbank, was historically part of the community but was designated part of the downtown Jacksonville business district in the 1980s. Notable neighborhoods within San Marco include Colonial Manor and South Riverside. The St. Nicholas neighborhood is immediately to the east of San Marco.

== History ==
=== Early history ===
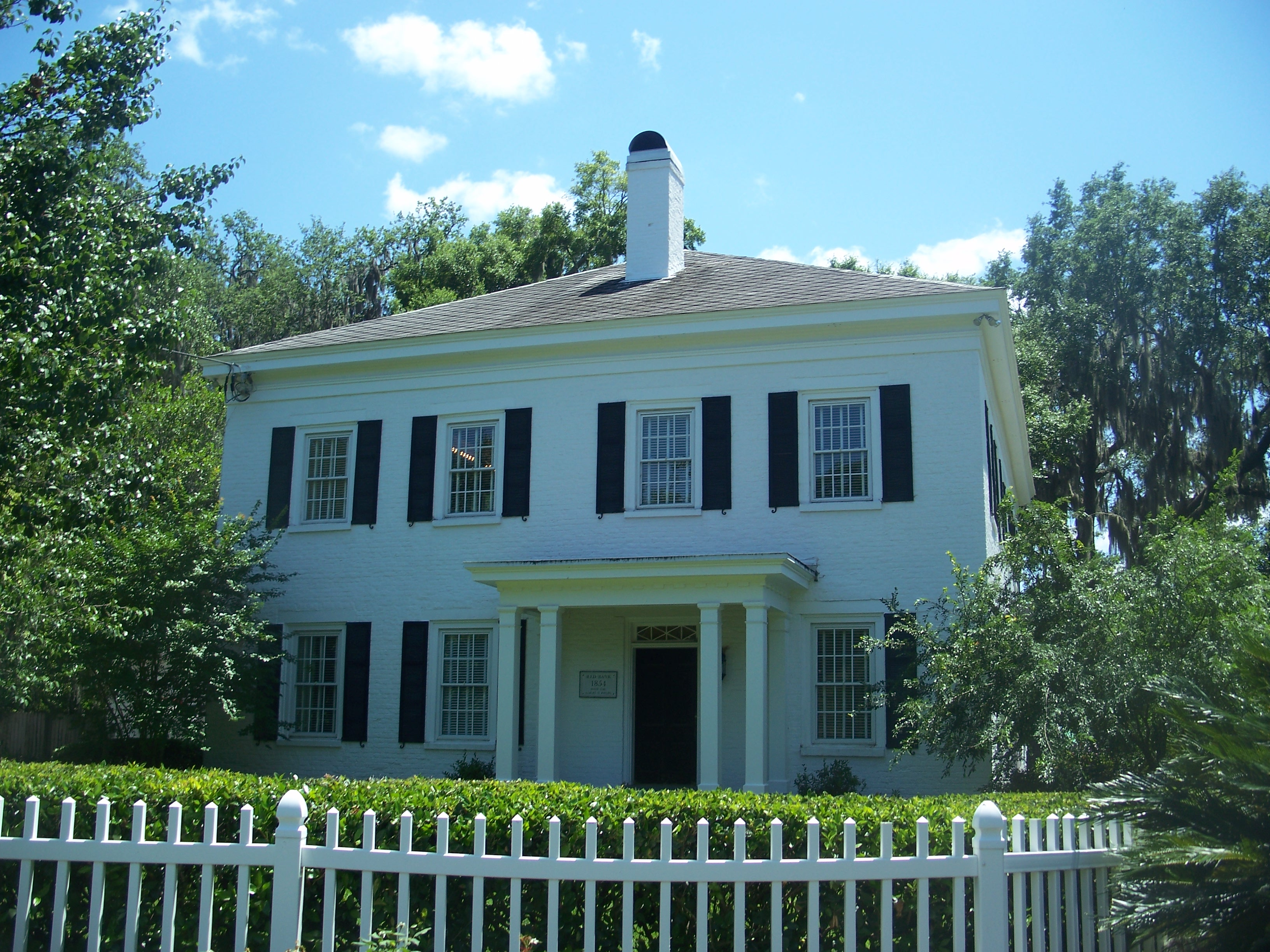
The Red Bank Plantation House, now a private residence in San Marco

Permanent habitation on this part of the St. Johns River came only during Florida's British period, when officials established a ferry crossing at the Cow Ford in 1760. The ferry docked on the river's southern bank, which was thus populated continuously long before what is now downtown Jacksonville. When the Spanish resumed control of Florida in 1783 they built Fort San Nicolas beside the ferry landing in present-day St. Nicholas. In 1793 the Spanish government issued a land grant for a slave plantation, which was eventually taken over by Isaac Hendricks. By 1850, Hendricks had married Elizabeth Hudnall, who owned a large adjacent tract, and his daughter Margaret married Albert Gallatin Philips, owner of the nearby Red Bank Plantation; as a result much of the area was owned by families connected to each other by marriage.

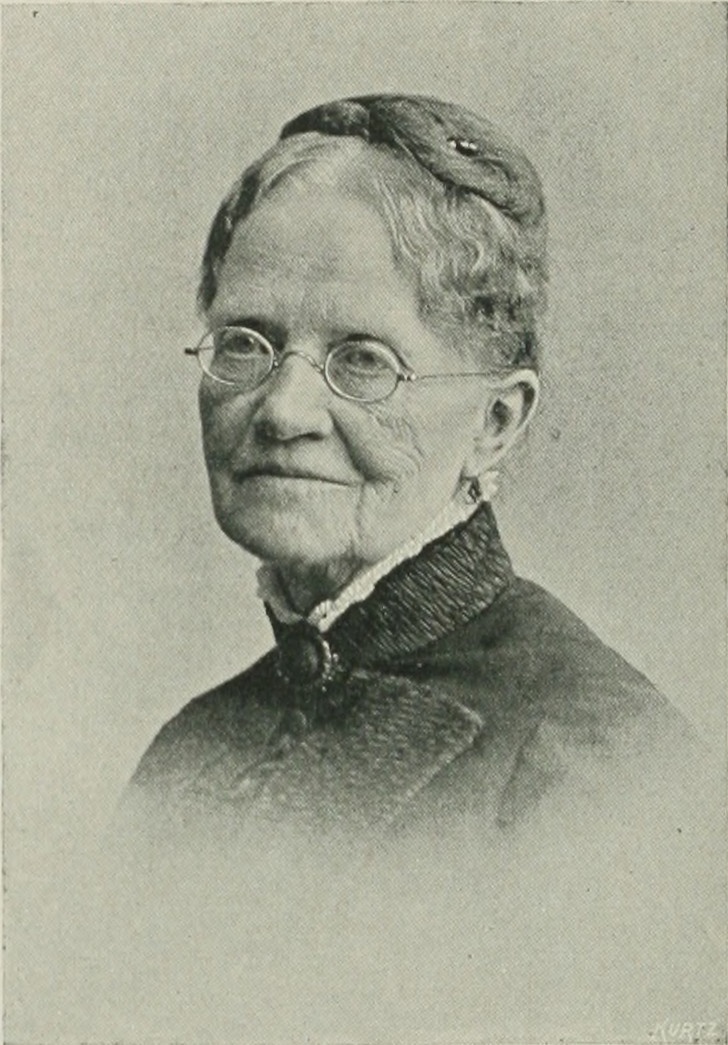
Martha Reed Mitchell

After the American Civil War, the plantations were broken up for residential developments. In 1873, Elizabeth Hendricks sold the eastern part of the Hendricks-Hudnall tract to retiring Florida governor Harrison Reed, who moved there and established the original South Jacksonville development. In 1882, Hendricks developed the western portion of her land as "Oklahoma". South of Oklahoma, Harrison Reed's sister, Martha Reed Mitchell, and her husband Alexander established the vast estate of Alexandria as a winter home. Martha Mitchell became a prominent fixture in Jacksonville society, involved in a number of charities and causes. By 1900, the developments had grown into a community generally known as "South Jacksonville".

=== South Jacksonville ===
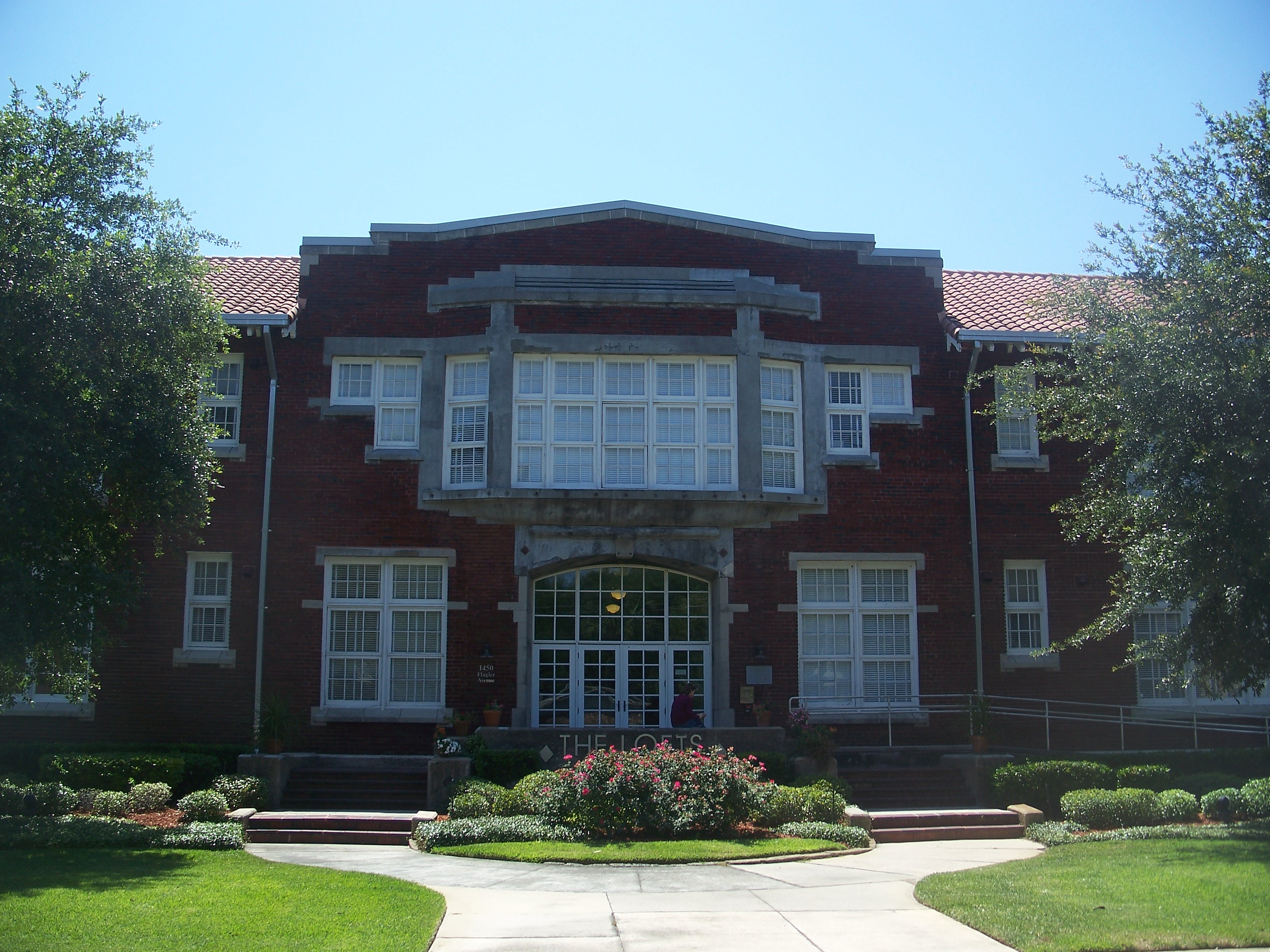
The former South Jacksonville Grammar School, now converted to lofts

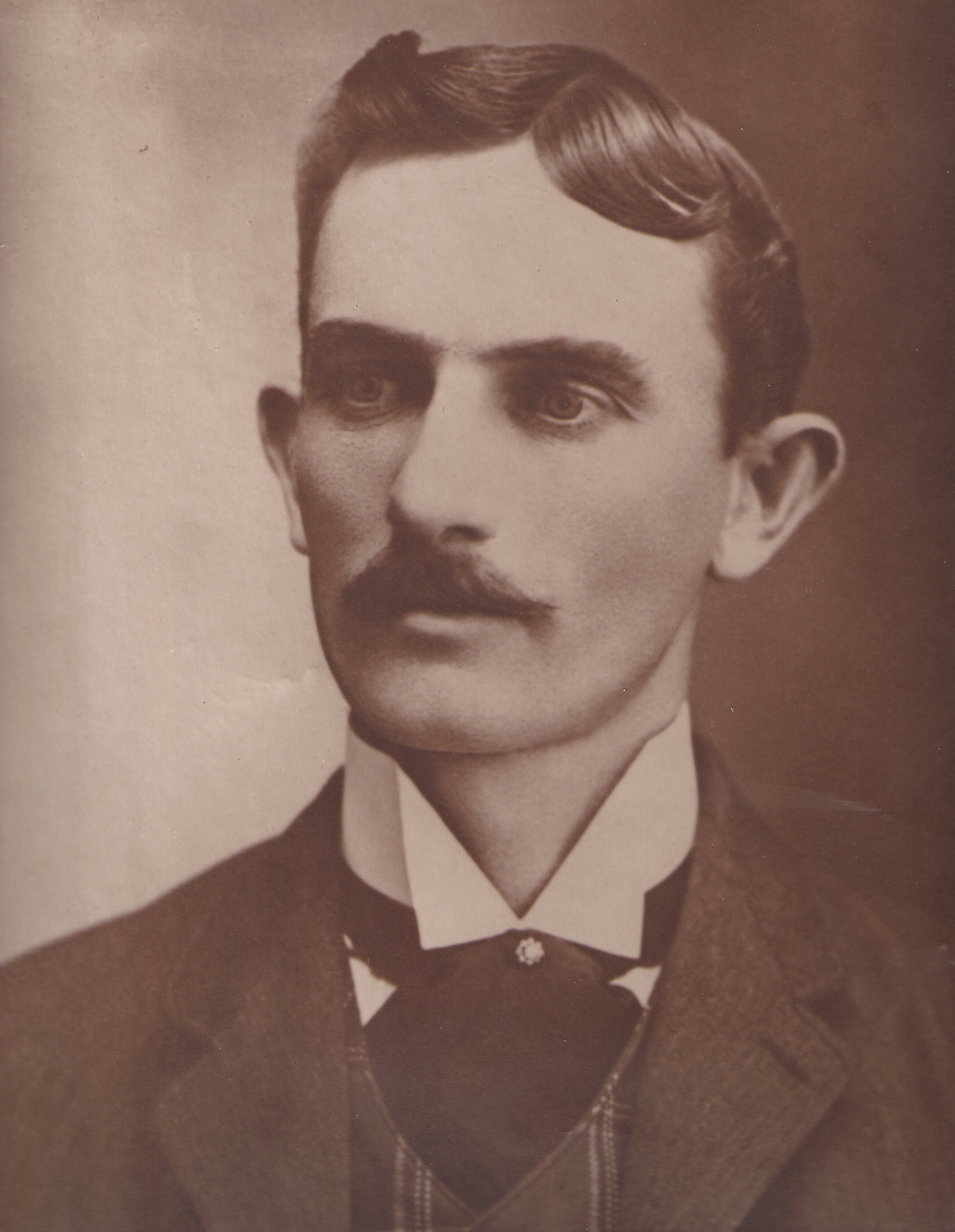
John Fletcher White Jr., the first Mayor of South Jacksonville

Promoters marketed South Jacksonville as a suburb of Jacksonville, though access to the city across the river was limited to ferries. Following the completion of the FEC Railway Bridge in 1890, several railways serviced South Jacksonville, contributing to its growth. By 1907, South Jacksonville was a regional transit hub with a population of around 600, though it still lacked paved streets, sidewalks, and electric lights. Led by businessman John Fletcher White and the Hendricks and Philips families, residents voted to incorporate the town. S. M. Scruggs was appointed its first mayor; White defeated him in the inaugural election six months after.

Growth came rapidly over the next few years as the town saw the construction of a bank, a public school, a city hall, several sizable industries and a series of amusement parks at present-day Treaty Oak Park. In 1910, Atlantic Boulevard opened between South Jacksonville and the Jacksonville Beaches, further cementing South Jacksonville's place as a hub for car and ferry traffic. By 1917, the town's population was ten times what it had been when it was incorporated, so local leaders planned the original Acosta Bridge, connecting Jacksonville and South Jacksonville by road for the first time.

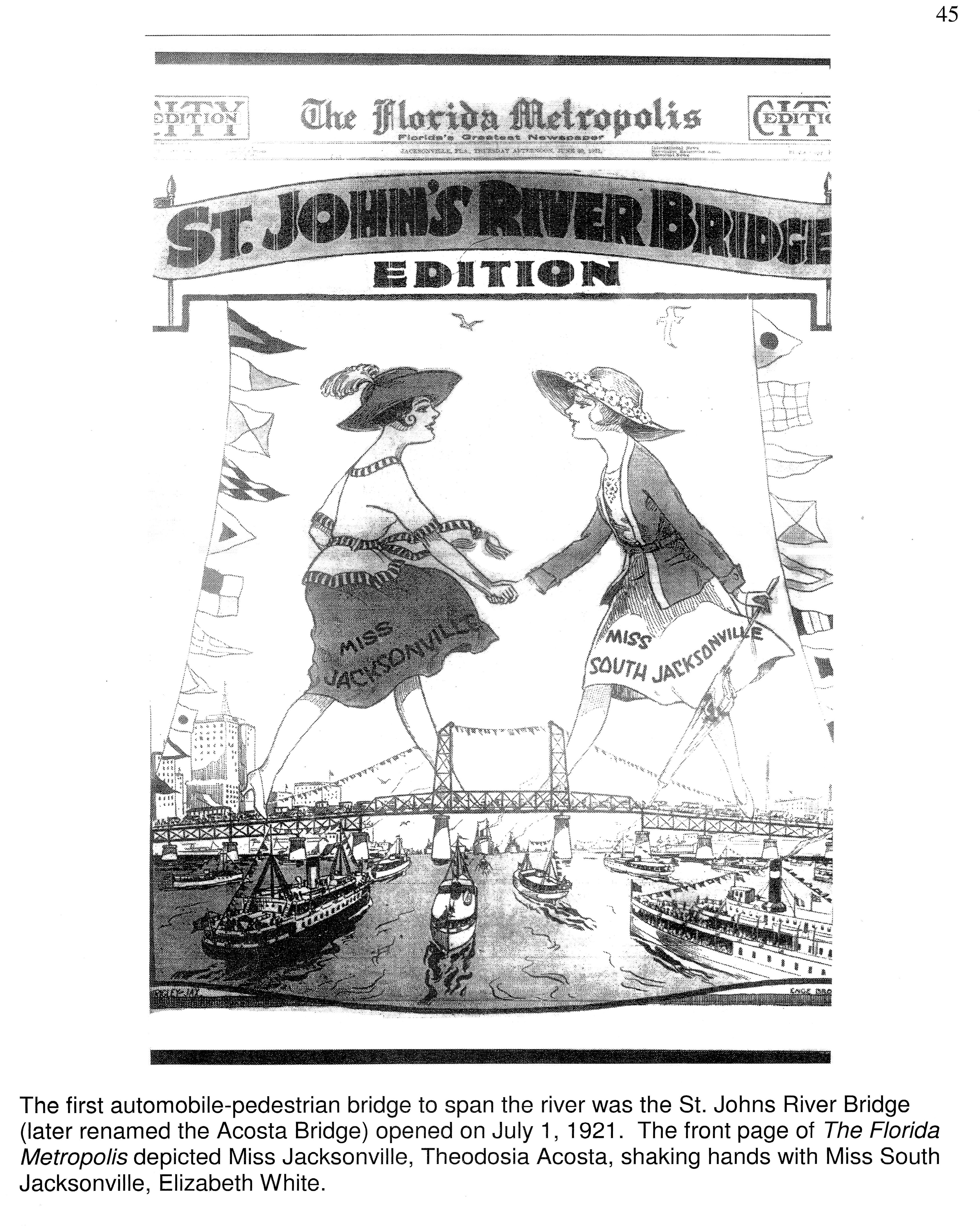
Jacksonville Journal cover celebrating the opening of the Acosta Bridge

The bridge opened in 1921 and spurred a new wave of development in South Jacksonville. New subdivisions were platted in Oklahoma and Villa Alexandria, including South Shores, Alexandria Place, River Oaks, and the original San Marco development, while the old Red Bank plantation became South Riverside and Colonial Manor. In 1857, the Red Bank Plantation House became a residence in the Colonial Manor neighborhood that grew around it; it is Jacksonville's second oldest residential building still in use. The bridge triggered economic development in South Jacksonville as well, though it greatly reduced the ferry business, which disappeared entirely within twenty years.

=== San Marco development ===
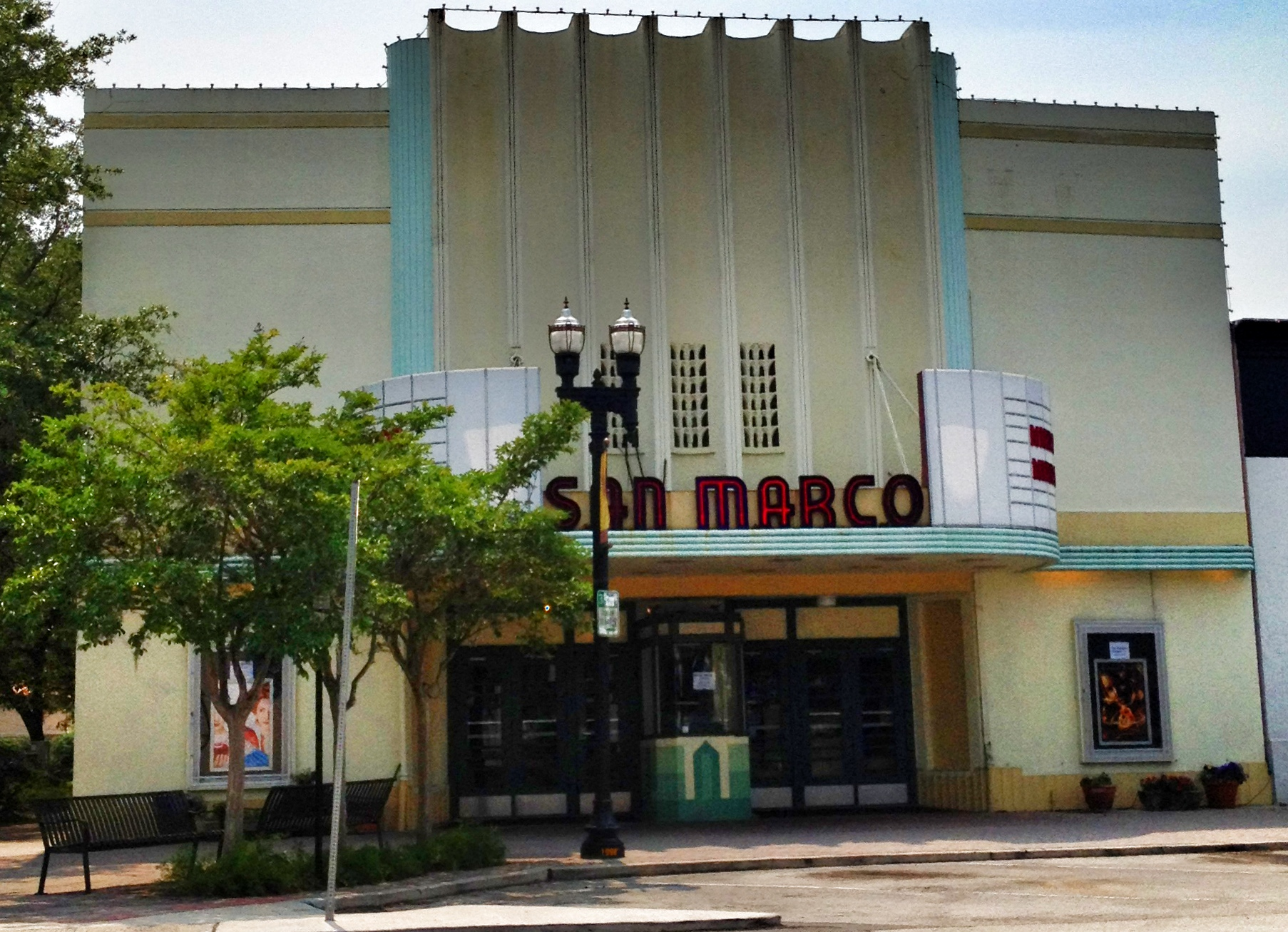
San Marco Theatre

San Marco, which eventually gave its name to the former area of South Jacksonville, broke ground in 1925 as the city's most ambitious development. It was constructed over 80 acres of the former Villa Alexandria estate, which had deteriorated after Martha Reed Mitchell's death in 1902. The developer was Telfair Stockton, who had previously established the exclusive Avondale neighborhood on the other side of the river. San Marco, designed as a fashionable, upscale development in keeping with Villa Alexandria's reputation, comprised 250 lots and a commercial district. It was remarkably successful from the beginning; apparently driven by land speculation, San Marco shattered local records by selling every lot within three hours of putting them up for sale, even though very little work had begun.

Construction on the first buildings started in 1926. San Marco was originally planned in the Italian Renaissance revival style, which influenced the name of the development and several of its streets. The commercial district was called "San Marco Square" after Venice's Piazza San Marco, and featured several Mediterranean buildings and a fountain. Ultimately, however, few of the homes built there kept to the style, which was falling out of favor at the time. Instead, a diverse mix of contemporary architectural styles appeared in the development in the late 1920s. A former clay pit was landscaped into an artificial lake, Lake Marco.

Unlike most of Jacksonville's neighborhoods, San Marco's momentum and profusion of desirable properties carried it through the collapse of the 1920s Florida land boom and the onset of the Great Depression. While other neighborhoods faltered in the downturn, in 1929, Telfair Stockton formed a company to purchase and develop the remainder of the former Villa Alexandria property as the "First Addition to San Marco". San Marco grew steadily through the 1930s, with new lots selling into the 1940s.

=== Annexation and later history ===
By 1931, many Duval County residents were warming to the idea of merging municipal and county governments to reduce bureaucracy, corruption and weak management. As a result, in 1932, citizens of both cities voted for the annexation of South Jacksonville into Jacksonville. While full city-county consolidation was voted down, the efforts of the 1930s set the stage for further attempts, ultimately resulting in the 1968 Jacksonville Consolidation.

In 1937, Jacksonville annexed the neighborhoods on the old Red Bank property. As development continued to spread south of the city limits, much of the former city of South Jacksonville came to be called "San Marco". The area was increasingly integrated into Jacksonville's urban fabric, and in the 1980s the area along the St. Johns River, known as the Southbank, was designated part of the Downtown Jacksonville central business district and was developed primarily for commercial office uses. Meanwhile, the neighborhood began to decline under the pressure of suburban sprawl. In 1975, the San Marco Preservation Society (SMPS) was formed to encourage historic preservation and to revitalize the commercial district. Subsequently, the society and the City of Jacksonville undertook a series of urban renewal projects, including renovating San Marco Square, building a new branch library and park complex, and converting the former South Jacksonville City Hall as the SMPS headquarters.

== San Marco Square ==
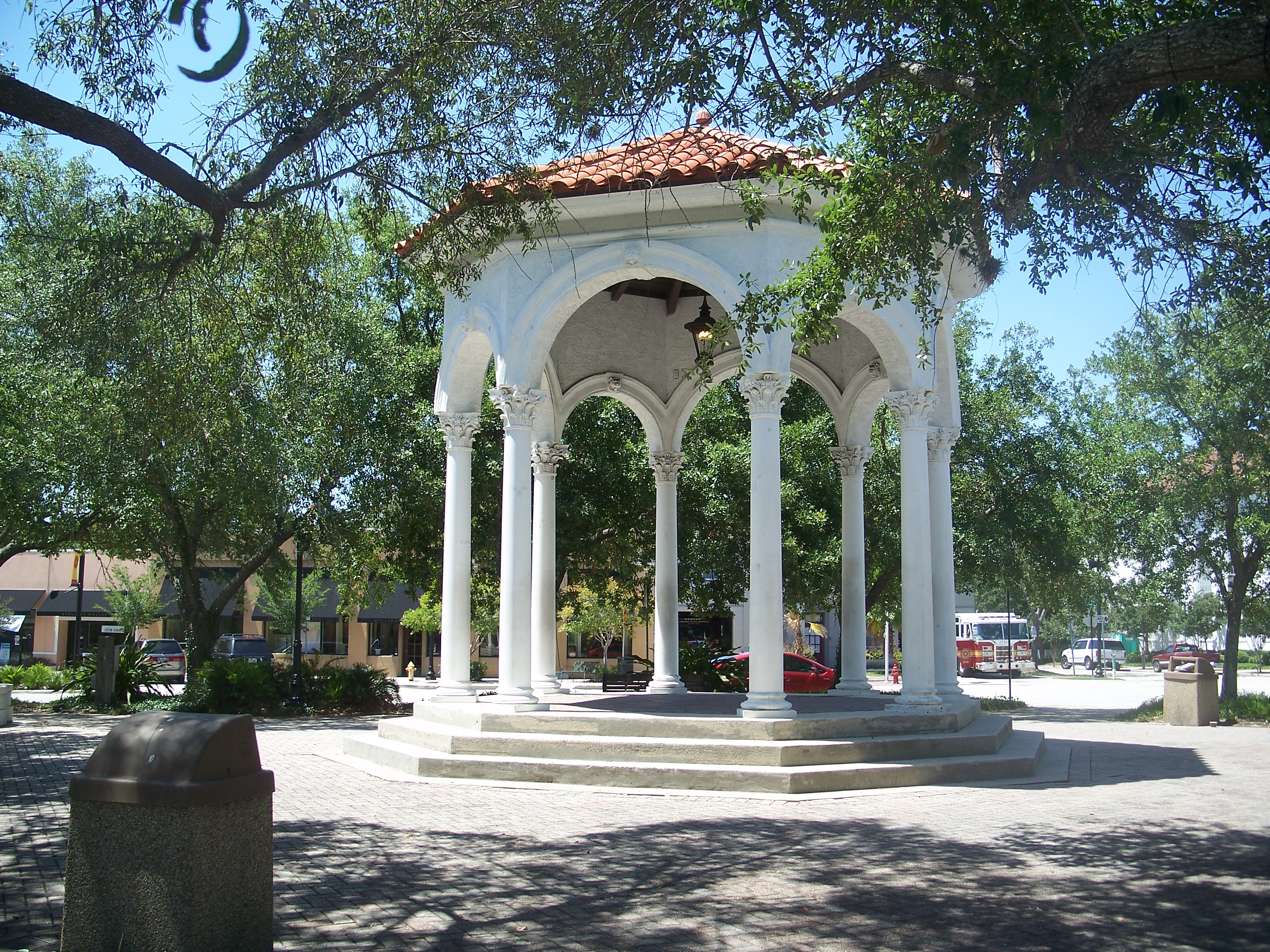
Gazebo in San Marco Square

San Marco Square is the neighborhood's major commercial district. The triangular district is located at the three-way juncture of Atlantic Boulevard, Hendricks Avenue and San Marco Boulevard; a tiered fountain at the center of the square originally marked the convergence of these streets. The San Marco Building, a Mediterranean Revival structure completed in 1927, was the district's first commercial building and set its architectural tone. Other features of the square include the San Marco Theatre, an art deco single-screen movie theater first opened in 1938; and the Little Theatre, home to Theatre Jacksonville, one of the country's oldest community theater troupes.

Designed as the commercial heart of San Marco, the square had declined seriously by the 1970s, with many businesses closing. The original, compass-themed fountain was demolished. In the 1990s, the City of Jacksonville undertook a major renovation and streetscaping project, which included restoring the fountain with three lion statues inspired by the Piazza San Marco. Since then, the square has become a popular commercial destination with many shops, restaurants and bars. In 2013, the square underwent another renovation project that rerouted the streets and expanded the small park in the center, named Balis Park, into a larger pedestrian green space.

== Features ==
San Marco has a number of parks of various sizes and purposes; the San Marco Preservation Society lists fourteen within its boundaries. There are two more in the Southbank: Treaty Oak Park, home of one of Jacksonville's oldest live oaks, and Friendship Fountain Park. Other amenities on the Southbank include the Museum of Science and History (MOSH) and the Southbank Riverwalk. San Marco is served by an elementary school, a middle school, and the Southside Branch Public Library. Two major projects of the San Marco Preservation Society have been the restoration of the former South Jacksonville City Hall as the society's headquarters and the conversion of the former St. Paul's Episcopal Church building into Preservation Hall, a reservable banquet hall.
