= Jefferson station (Jacksonville) =

Station of the Jacksonville Skyway

Jefferson
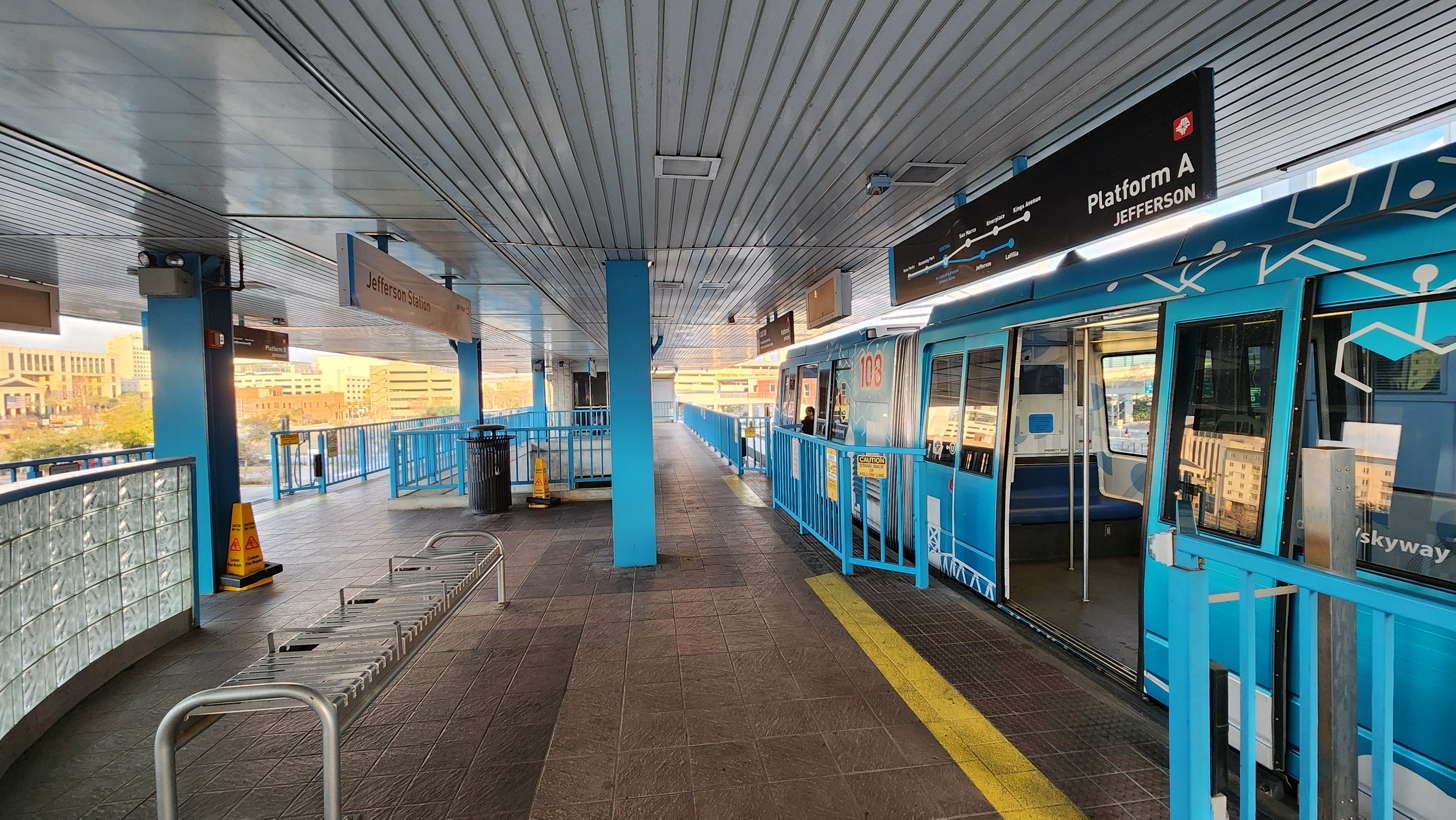

General information
- Location: 800 Bay Street West; Jacksonville, Florida
- Coordinates: 30°19′39.5″N 81°40′03″W
- Owner: Jacksonville Transportation Authority
- Platforms: 1 island platform
- Tracks: 2
- Connections: JTA Bus: 1, 3, 4, 8A, 10, 11, 13, 17, 18, 19, 21, 22, 25, 53, 201 (Clay Express), 800 (Nassau Express), XS2 (St. Johns Express); First Coast Flyer: Blue, Green, Red

Construction
- Structure type: Elevated
- Accessible: Yes

History
- Opened: May 30, 1989; 37 years ago

Services
Preceding station	Jacksonville Transportation Authority	Following station
LaVilla Terminus	Skyway	Central toward Rosa Parks
Location

Jefferson station is a Skyway monorail station in downtown Jacksonville, Florida. It is located on Bay Street just west of Jefferson Street.

== History ==
Jefferson was one of the three original stations that opened with the initial 0.7-mile (1.1 km) segment of the Skyway on May 30, 1989. It is located between Terminal station to the west and Central station to the east. All three stations were closed between December 1996 and December 1997, when the Skyway was converted into a monorail.

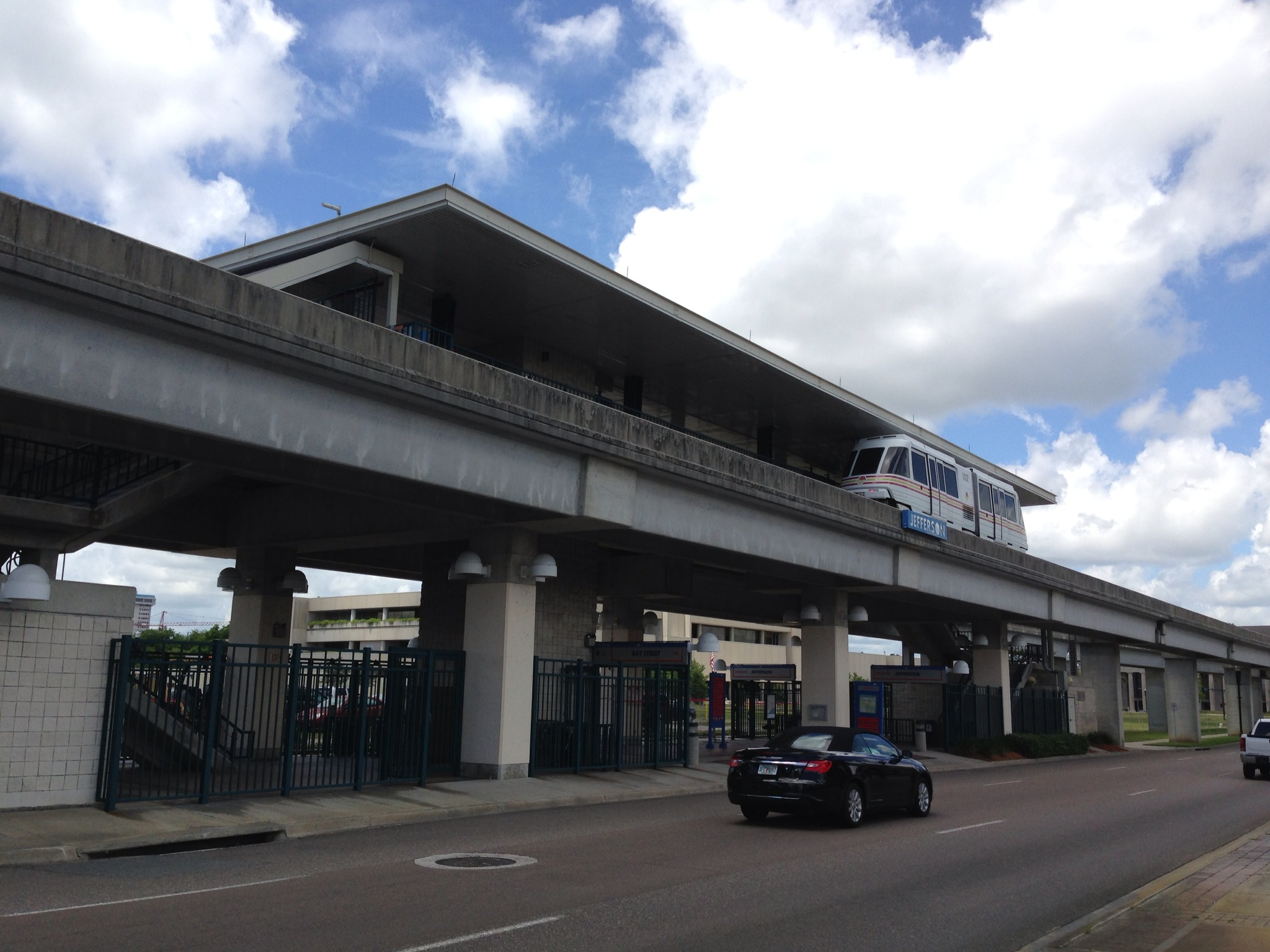
Exterior in 2013

The station was closed from July 5, 2017 until May 4, 2020 during the construction of the Jacksonville Regional Transportation Center at LaVilla and an adjacent apartment complex.
