= Downtown Jacksonville =

Neighborhood of Jacksonville, Florida

- Neighborhood
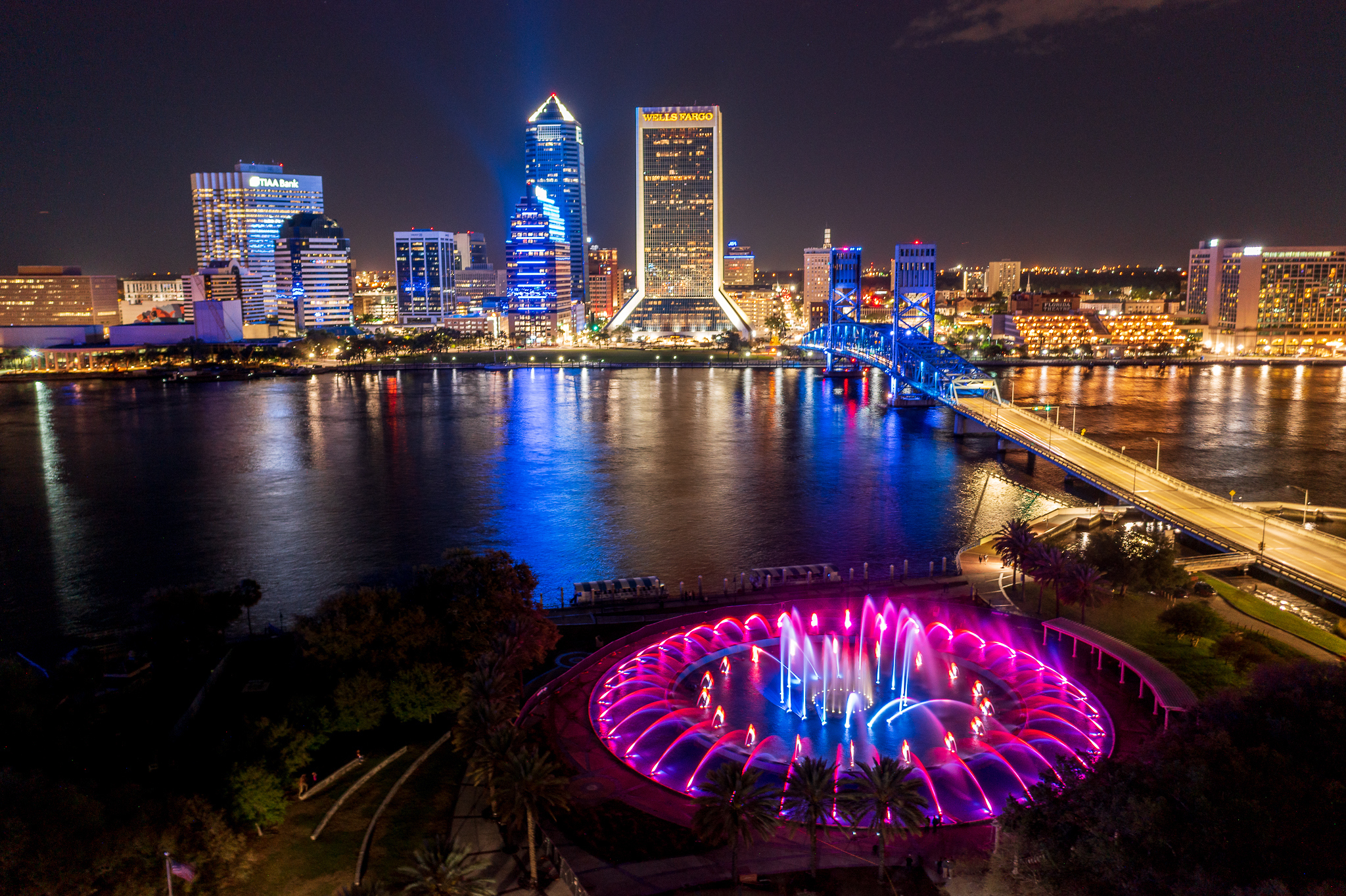
- Downtown Jacksonville in 2022

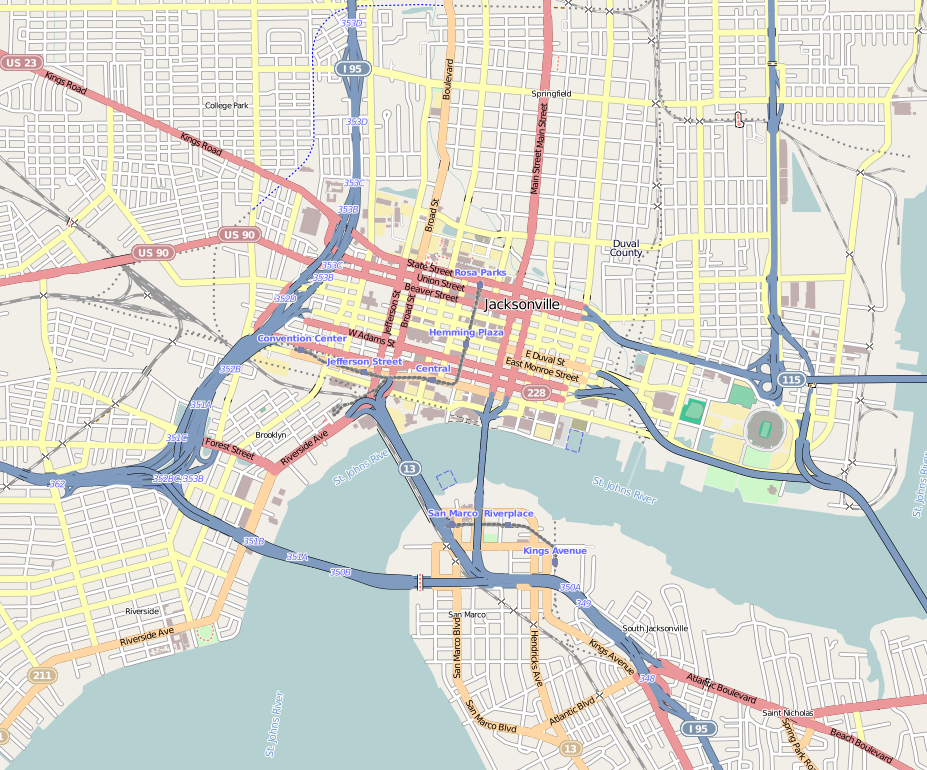
- Central Jacksonville
- Coordinates: 30.32764°N 81.66012°W

Government
  - City Council: LeAnna Cumber, Reggie Gaffney, Don Redmon (former), Warren A. Jones (former), Dr. Johnny Gaffney (former)
  - State Assembly: Reggie Fullwood (former)
  - State Senate: Audrey Gibson
  - U.S. House: Aaron Bean (R)

Area
  - Total: 3.91 sq mi (10.1 km^{2})
  - Land: 2.75 sq mi (7.1 km^{2})

Population (2015)
  - Total: 8,000
  - Density: 2,900/sq mi (1,100/km^{2})
- ZIP Code: 32202,32207
- Area codes: 904, 324
- Website: downtownjacksonville.com

Downtown Jacksonville is the historic core and central business district (CBD) of Jacksonville, Florida, United States. It comprises the earliest area of the city to be developed and is located in its geographic center along the narrowing point of the St. Johns River.

Downtown Jacksonville is one of eight districts in the city. The other seven include: the Central Core (or Northbank), the Southbank, LaVilla, Brooklyn, the Working Waterfront, the Cathedral, the Church, and the Entertainment & Sports District. Downtown Jacksonville is the home to several major corporations, including CSX Corporation, Fidelity National Financial, TIAA Bank, Black Knight Financial, Rayonier Advanced Materials, Interline Brands, Haskell, FIS, and Stein Mart.

== History ==
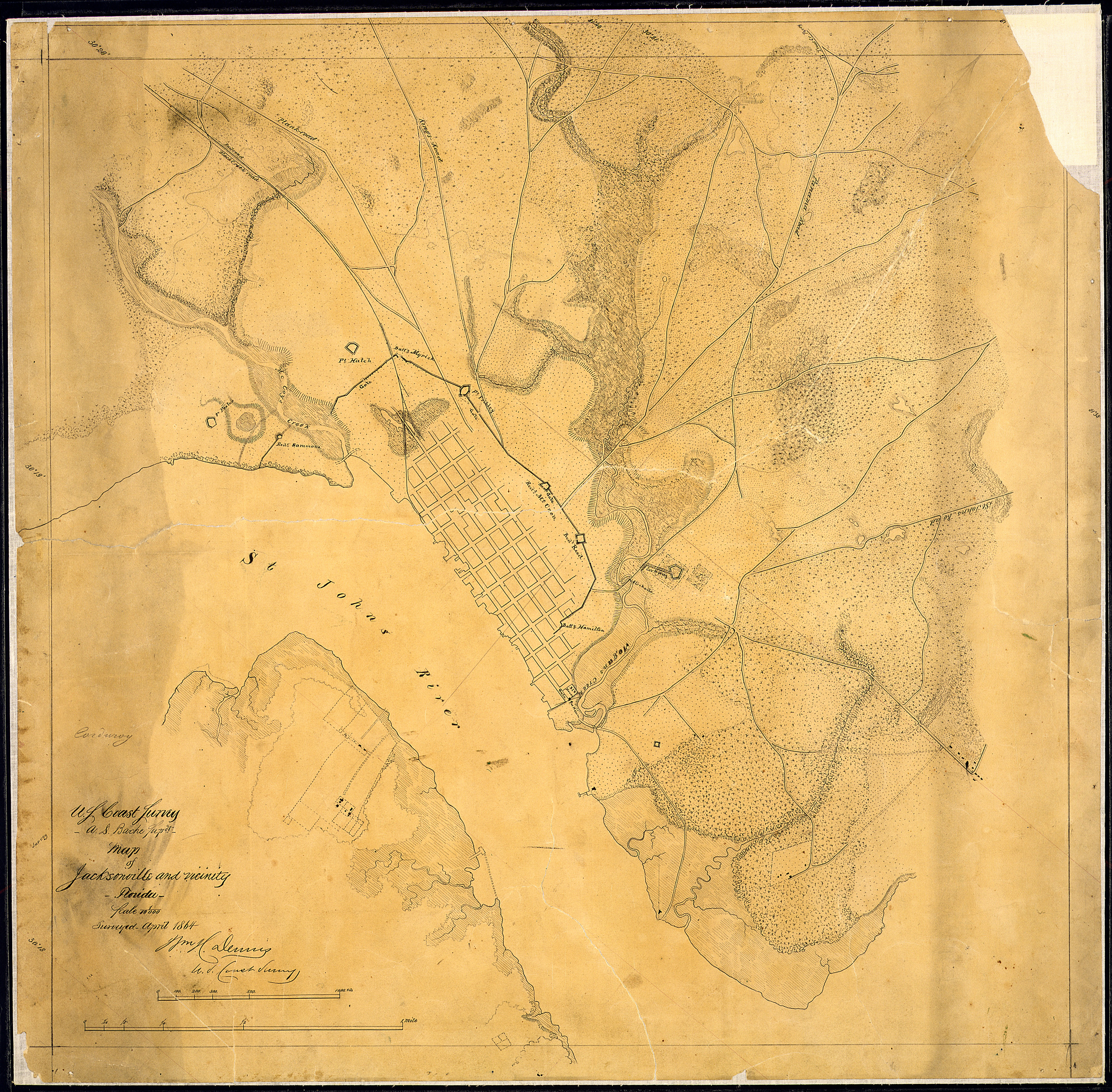
Jacksonville in April 1864

The site of modern Downtown Jacksonville originated at a crossing of the St. Johns River known to the Seminole as Wacca Pilatka, to the Spanish as the Pass de San Nicolas, and to later British settlers as the Cow Ford. Histories of the city report that there was once an Indian village at the site called Ossachite. White settlement in the area began during Florida's British period (1763–1783), when the East Florida government built the King's Road to connect St. Augustine with the British colonies to the north. A ferry and tavern were built, and when Spanish rule resumed in Florida, Fort San Nicolas was built beside the southern landing of the King's Road ferry. American farmer Robert Pritchard became the first white settler on the north bank of the Cow Ford when he received a 450-acre land grant from the Spanish government in 1791, however, he died shortly after and the area was abandoned.

The settlement that became Jacksonville largely formed from two land grants issued in 1816: one to Maria Taylor, née Suarez, and one to Juan LeMaestre. Over time a small settlement including some homes, an inn and a store grew at the Cow Ford, and in 1822, shortly after Spain ceded the Floridas to the United States, resident Isaiah D. Hart proposed establishing a town on the north bank. Hart eventually convinced his neighbors to join him in donating land for the venture, and the first streets were platted in June. The settlement was named "Jacksonville" after Andrew Jackson, who had become popular among many Floridians for his actions in the First Seminole War. It was incorporated in 1832.

The town grew in fits and starts: it saw disruption during the Second Seminole War (1835–1842), and the business district burned down in 1854 when sparks from the steamboat Florida started a fire. During the American Civil War, Jacksonville was home to many Union sympathizers, and was occupied for most of the war by Union troops who took the city four separate times. The war devastated Jacksonville and caused over half the population to flee. After the war, the city rebounded quickly when it became Florida's first major tourist destination; though tourism declined by the late 1880s growth and industry continued apace through the late 19th century.

On May 3, 1901, downtown Jacksonville was ravaged by a fire that started at a fiber factory. Known as the Great Fire of 1901, it was one of the worst disasters in Florida history and the largest urban fire in the southeastern United States. In just eight hours, it destroyed the business district and left approximately 10,000 residents homeless. Architect Henry John Klutho was a primary figure in the reconstruction of the city.

== Geography ==
Multiple definitions of Downtown Jacksonville are in common use. Often, the name "Downtown" is used exclusively for the historical core. This is bounded roughly by State Street to the north, Hogans Creek to the east, the St. Johns River to the south, and the LaVilla neighborhood to the west. This definition is used, for example, by the Jacksonville Historic Preservation Commission and their book, Jacksonville's Architectural Heritage. However, the City of Jacksonville and other entities use a wider definition that includes not only the Downtown Core (also known as the Northbank), but surrounding areas on both sides of the river. In this definition, the boundaries are State Street to the north, the St. Johns River to the east, and Interstate 95 to the south and west. This area covers 1,234 acres (499 ha; 1.928 sq mi). Downtown Vision, Inc., which oversees Jacksonville's downtown improvement district, covers an even smaller area of about 90 blocks in the Downtown Core and Southbank, bounded by Church Street in the north, Market Street in the east, Prudential Drive in the south, and Broad Street in the west.

Under the broader definition, Downtown Jacksonville is divided into several districts or neighborhood. In addition to the historical Downtown Core, the most commonly used districts are: the Southbank, a commercial and residential district directly across the St. Johns River from the Downtown Core; LaVilla, a historically African-American neighborhood west of the Downtown Core; Brooklyn, to the southwest of the Downtown Core; and the Stadium District, an area containing the city's major sports and entertainment venues to the east of the Downtown Core.

A historic district encompassing a significant portion of downtown Jacksonville was listed on the National Register of Historic Places in 2016. Its boundaries are roughly Beaver Street to the north, Catherine and Liberty Streets to the east, the St. Johns River to the south, and North Pearl Street to the west. This area is significant for its pre-1965 architecture, most of which post-dates Jacksonville's great 1901 fire.

=== Districts of Downtown Jacksonville ===
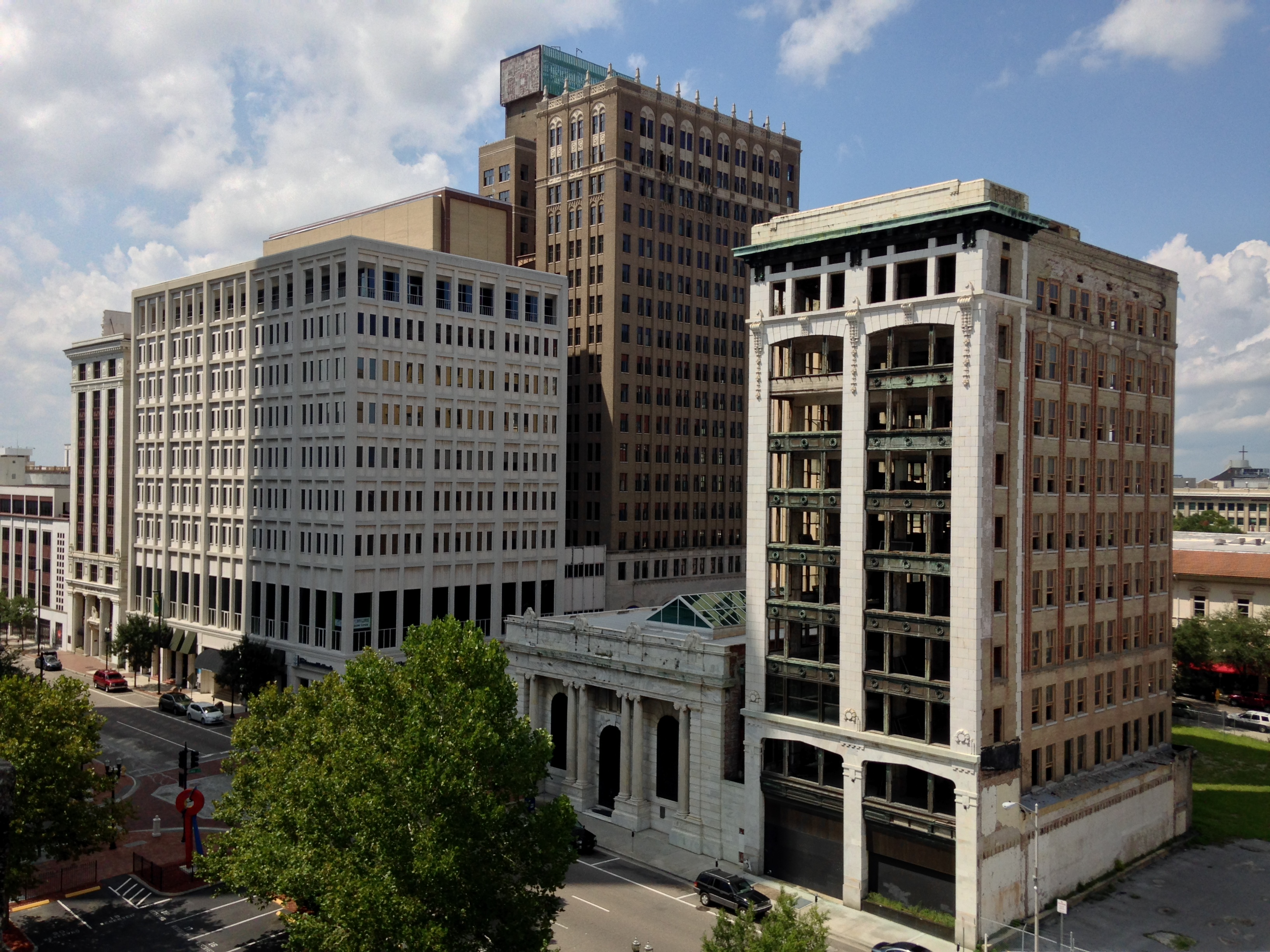
Corner of Laura and Forsyth Streets located in the Northbank Core

=== Central Core ===
Also known as the Northbank, is Jacksonville's traditional city center and what most people associate with Downtown and Jacksonville in general. It is the location of many government offices, including City Hall, the Jacksonville Sheriff's Office headquarters, and the Bryan Simpson United States Courthouse, and amenities such as the Jacksonville Main Library, the Museum of Contemporary Art Jacksonville, and the Jacksonville Riverwalk. Several of the city's largest skyscrapers are located there, such as the Bank of America Tower, the Wells Fargo Center, TIAA Bank Center, and the SunTrust Tower, and are home to some of the city's major employers, such as TIAA Bank and CSX Corporation.

=== The Cathedral District ===
Located in the northeast corner, near Hogans Creek. The 36-block area encompasses 118 acres. The neighborhood is currently being redeveloped. The District extends north to south from State Street to Adams Street and east to west from Main Street to N. Liberty Street. This mixed-used neighborhood is home to many of Jacksonville's landmark churches, including St. John's Episcopal Cathedral, the Mount Zion AME Church, Immaculate Conception Catholic Church, First Presbyterian Church, and the First United Methodist Church. Due to the area's close proximity to the former courthouse many of the residential structures have been converted into attorneys' offices.

=== The Entertainment & Sports District ===
Also known as the East Bay Street District and other names, exists in the southeastern corner of the Downtown Core, centered on East Bay Street. This area was historically industrial before the abandonment of the Jacksonville Shipyards and related industries. Committed to creating an authentic entertainment experience, The Elbow offers a wealth of diverse, walkable and award-winning culinary, nightlife, live music and performance venues. Cultivated around the historic Florida Theatre, The Elbow is one destination that encompasses many diverse restaurants, bars, and breweries. The formal boundaries are Bay Street to Adams Street and Main Street to Liberty Street. The Sports District, also known as the Sports Complex, is located east of the Downtown Core, and contains Jacksonville's major sporting and entertainment venues. Historically part of Jacksonville's Eastside, it is home to EverBank Stadium, VyStar Ballpark, VyStar Veterans Memorial Arena, Daily's Place Amphitheater, Metropolitan Park, and the Greater Jacksonville Fair and Expo Center. EverBank Stadium occupies the footprint of the old Gator Bowl Stadium, which was razed in 1994.

=== Southbank ===
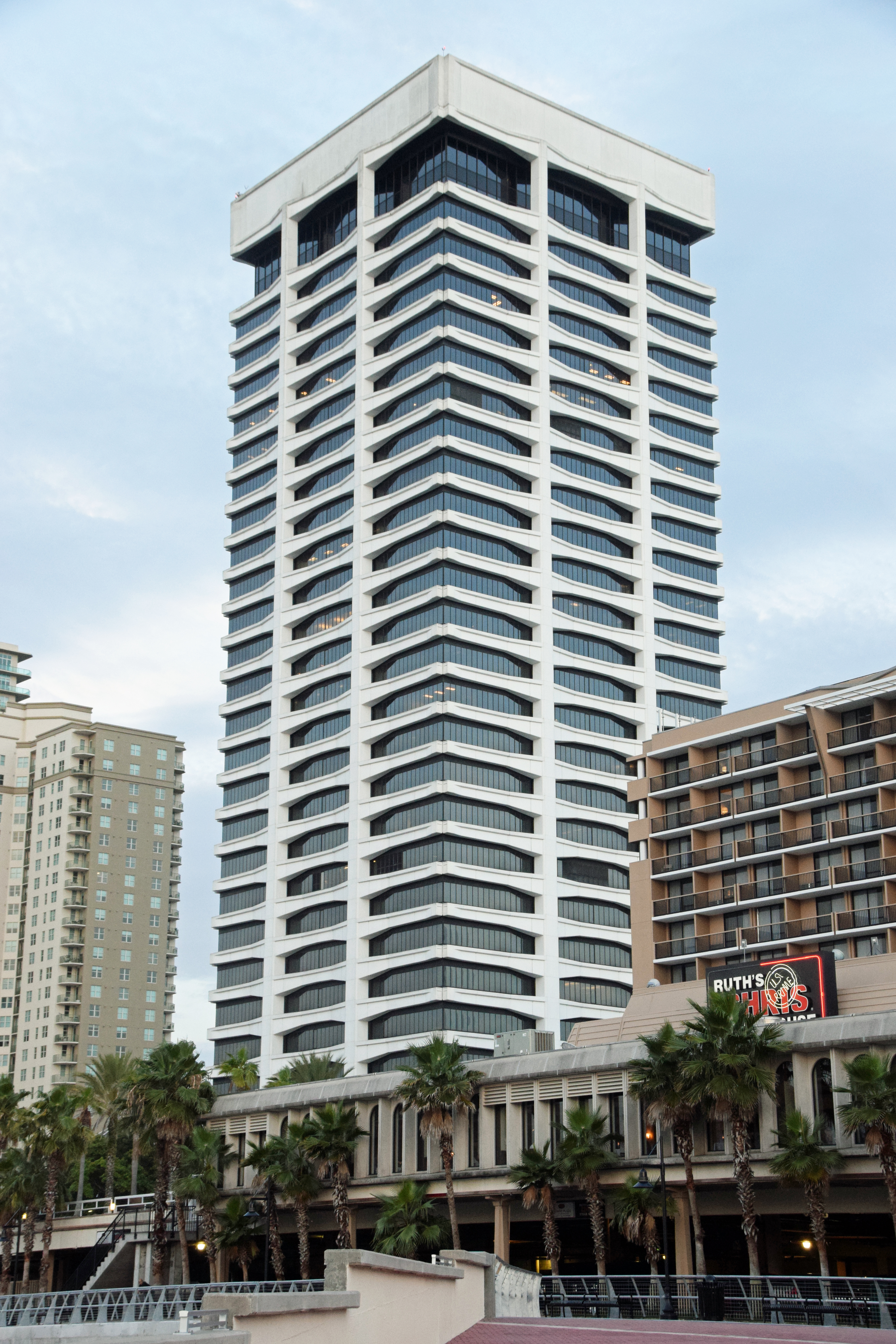
Riverplace Tower in Southbank

A mixed commercial and residential district on the southern shore of the St. Johns River, directly across from the Northbank. It is closely associated with (and sometimes considered part of) Jacksonville's San Marco neighborhood. It includes large office towers such as the Aetna Building, Riverplace Tower, and Baptist Medical Center. Residential towers include The Peninsula, The Strand, and San Marco Place. There are six major hotels on the Southbank as well as amenities such as the Museum of Science and History, Friendship Fountain and the Southbank Riverwalk. Though historically poorly designed for pedestrians, the city hopes to better integrate it with the rest of Downtown as well as San Marco.

=== LaVilla ===
A district immediately west of the Downtown Core. Jacksonville's first suburb, the predominantly African-American neighborhood was an independent municipality until being annexed in 1887. The area of the neighborhood north of Adams Street emerged as a mecca of African-American culture, and was home to many venues showcasing black performers, such as the Ritz Theatre. The southern part of the neighborhood was a major railroad hub and was also Jacksonville's chief red light district for a period.

The neighborhood went into serious decline in the 1960s, and has not recovered. Urban renewal projects commenced in the 1980s, resulting in the loss of many buildings. More recent projects have aimed at bringing commercial development and public amenities to the area.

=== Brooklyn ===
Located at the far southwestern corner of downtown, it comprises the area south of Lavilla and north and west of Interstate 95. Originally a residential suburb, it was annexed into Jacksonville in 1887. It is connected to Jacksonville's Riverside neighborhood by Riverside Avenue. It is home to Fidelity National Financial, TIAA Bank, and FIS corporate headquarters, and other offices.

Commercial and industrial uses became prominent in the 20th century, and many commercial office buildings were constructed along the river. Subsequently, a rift emerged between the office-centered part of the neighborhood on the river and the traditional neighborhood further inland. As a result, in the 21st century the city re-introduced residential zoning and the neighborhood has become the site of mixed-use developments.

=== Adjacent neighborhoods ===
- Springfield
- Eastside
- Arlington
- St. Nicholas
- San Marco
- Riverside and Avondale
- Mixon Town
- New Town
- Durkeeville

== Architecture ==
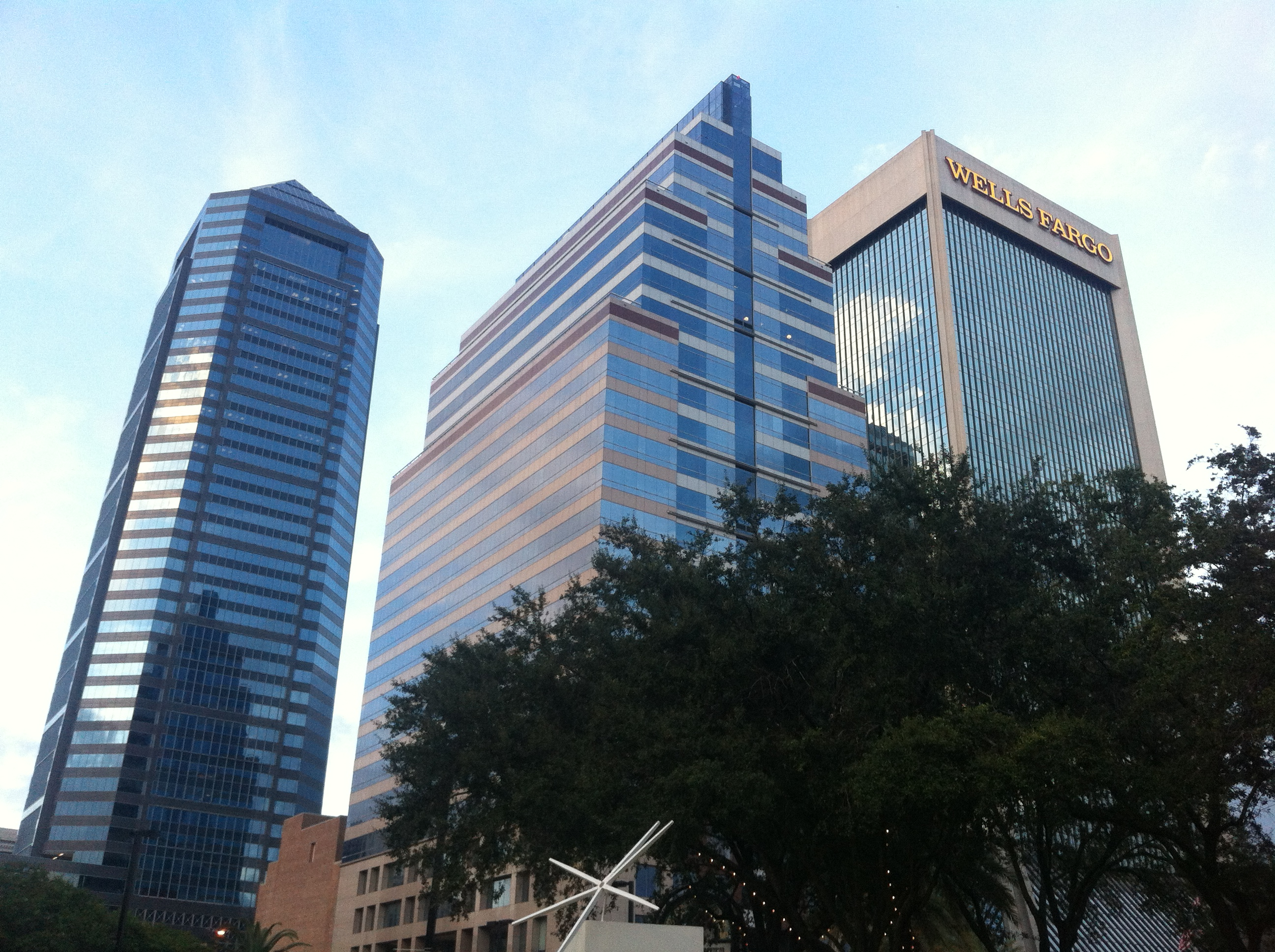
Downtown Northbank

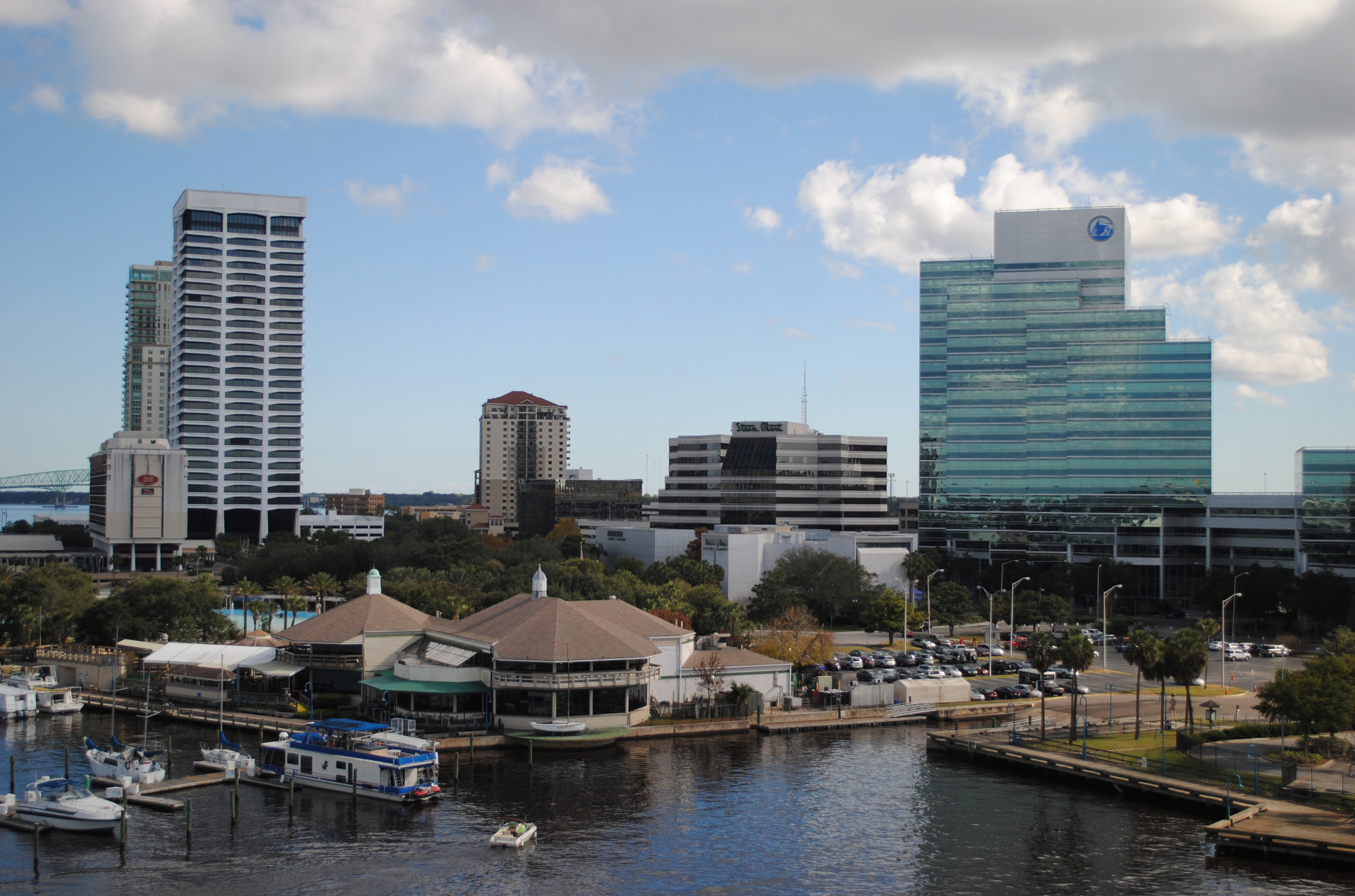
Downtown Southbank

The 14 tallest standard structures:

Std. rank	Name	Year	Location (Downtown)	Floors	Standard height ft	Std. hgt m	Notes
1	Bank of America Tower	1990	North Laura Street & West Bay Street	42	617	188	
2	Wells Fargo Center	1974	Laura Street & Independent Drive	37	535	163	
3	TIAA Bank Center	1983	West Bay Street & Pearl Street	32	447	136	
4	The Peninsula	2006	1431 Riverplace Boulevard	36	437	133	
5	Riverplace Tower	1967	Riverplace Boulevard & Flagler Avenue	28	432	132	
6	SunTrust Tower	1989	Laura Street & Independent Drive	24	357	109	
7	The Strand	2006	1401 Riverplace Boulevard	28	328	100	
8	Eight Forty One	1954	841 Prudential Drive	22	309	94	
9	Two Prudential Plaza	1985	Museum Circle & San Marco Boulevard	21	305	93	
10	One Enterprise Center	1986	Water & Hogan Streets	21	299	91	
11	Blue Cross Blue Shield Building	1971	Riverside Avenue & Edison Street	19	287	87	
12	BB&T Building	1974	West Forsyth & Hogan Streets	18	278	85	
13	John Milton Bryan Simpson United States Courthouse	2002	West Duval & Hogan Streets	15	277	84	
14	JEA Tower	2005	West Church & Main Streets	19	268	82	

== Parks and plazas ==
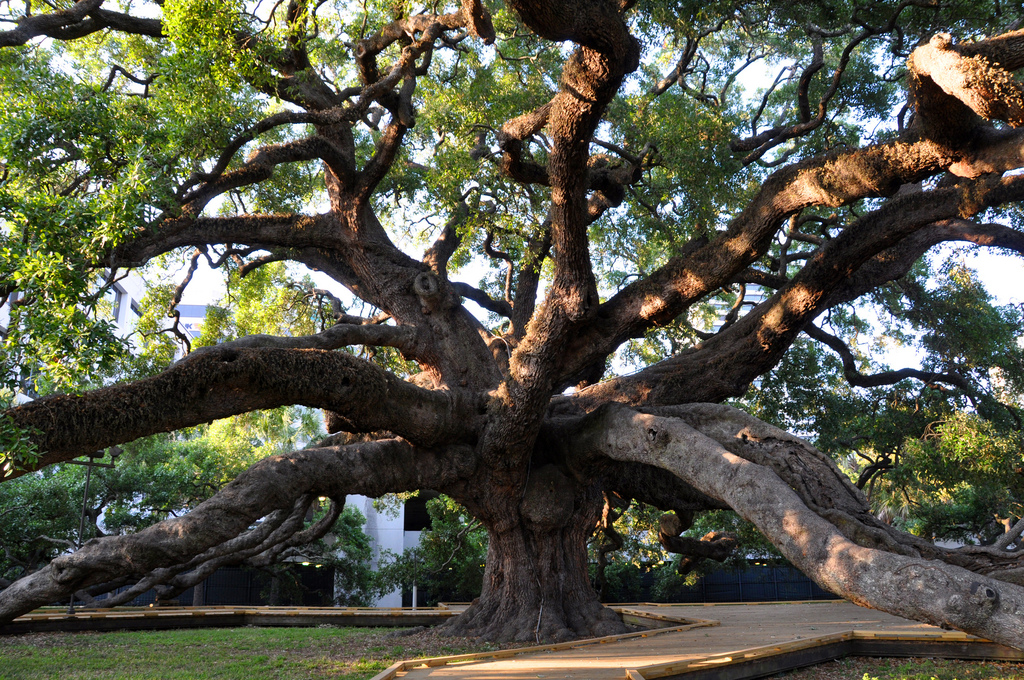
Treaty Oak Park

Downtown is home to numerous parks, large and small:

- Brooklyn Park
- Courthouse Lawn
- Friendship Fountain
- James Weldon Johnson Park
- Metropolitan Park
- Northbank Riverwalk
- Southbank Riverwalk
- Plaza at TIAA Bank Center
- Treaty Oak Park
- Riverfront Plaza

== Economy ==
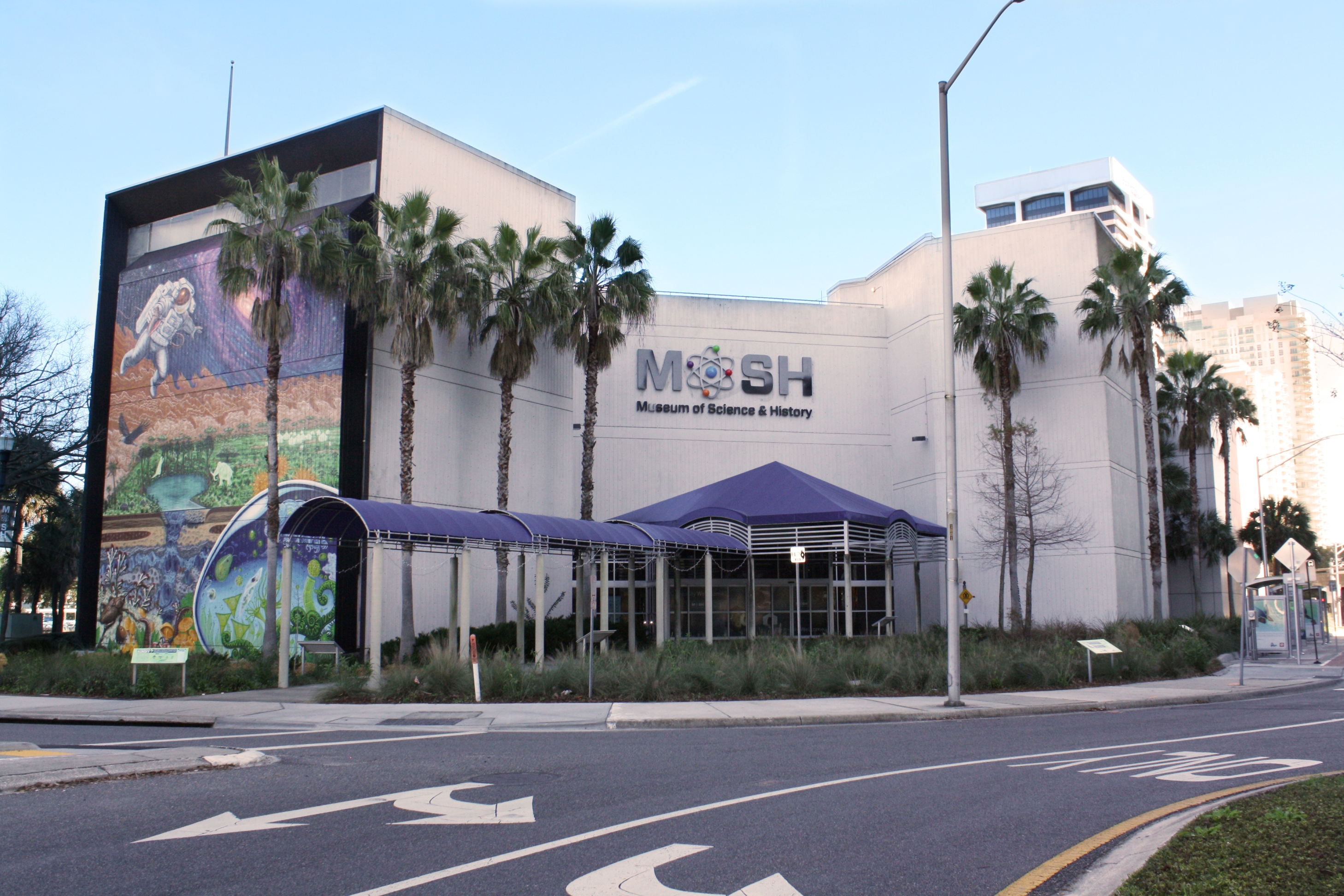
Museum of Science and History

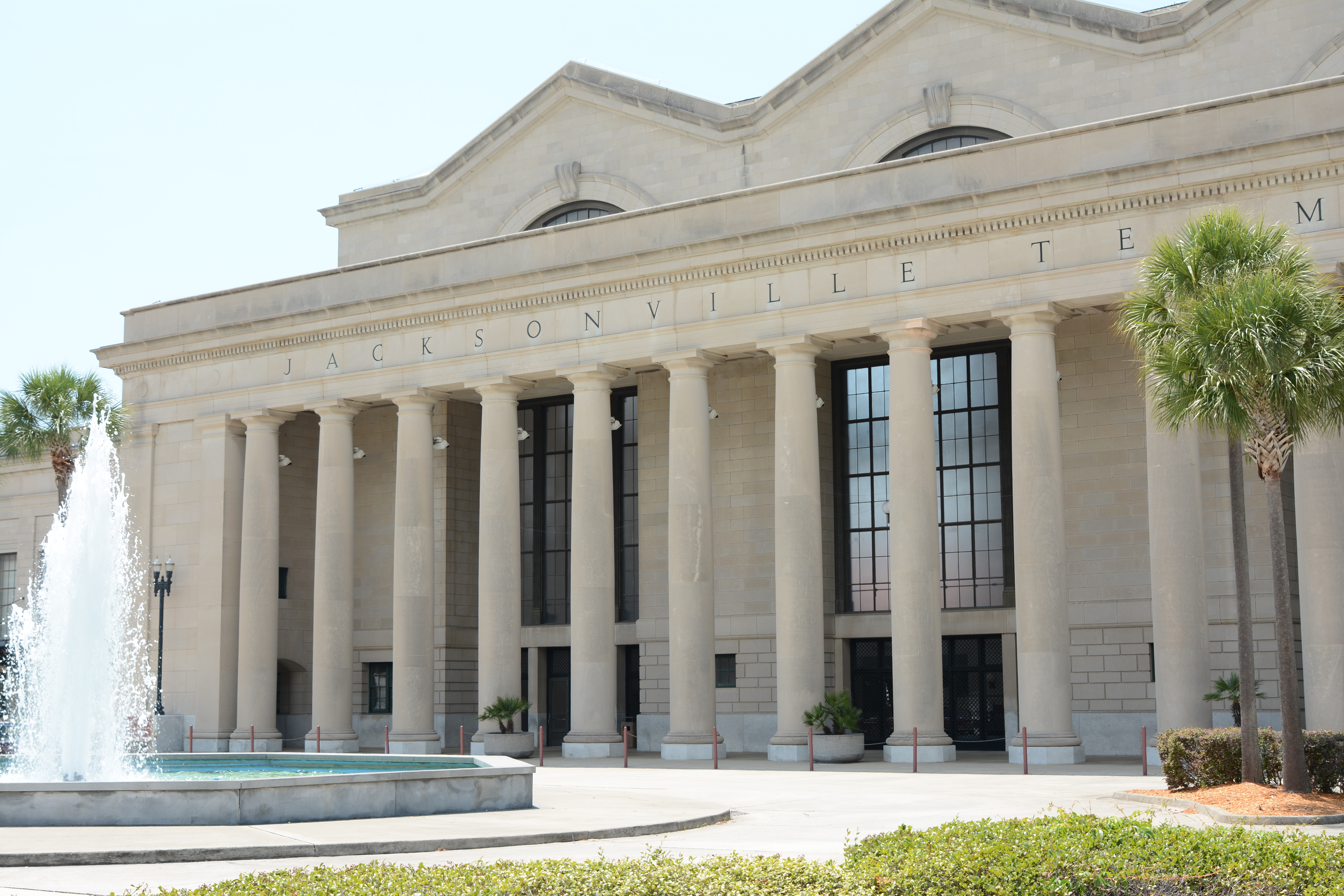
Prime F. Osborn III Convention Center

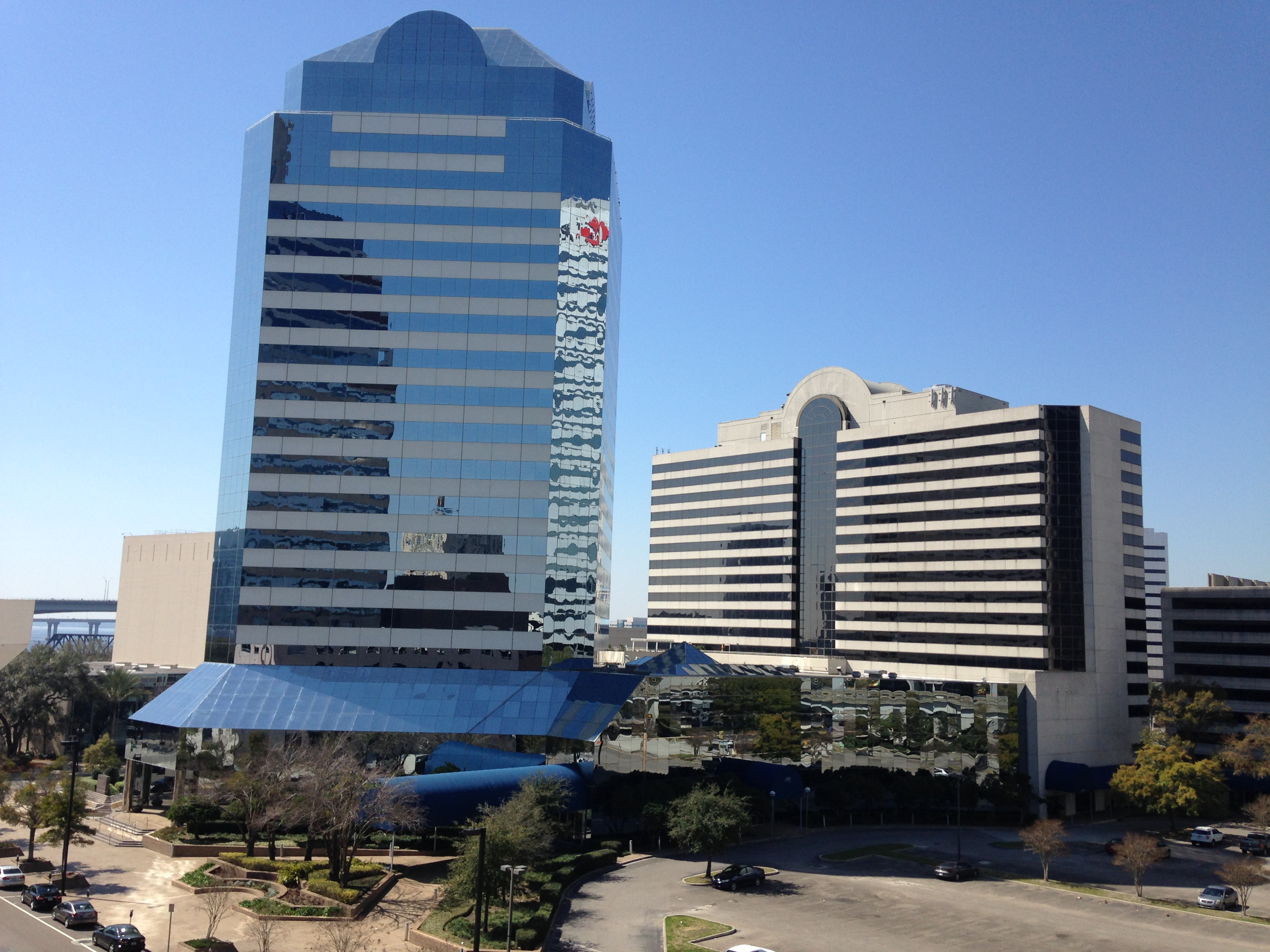
Omni Jacksonville Hotel adjacent to One Enterprise Center

=== Tourism ===
The following attractions are located in the downtown Jacksonville area:

- TIAA Bank Field
- Baseball Grounds of Jacksonville
- Jacksonville Veterans Memorial Arena
- Prime F. Osborn III Convention Center
- Museum of Contemporary Art Jacksonville
- Museum of Science and History
- Jacksonville Fire Museum
- Ritz Theatre & Museum
- Florida Theatre
- Times-Union Center for the Performing Arts

== Transportation ==
Downtown Jacksonville transportation options include bus, JTA Skyway, water taxi, as well as major roadways.

=== Public transportation ===
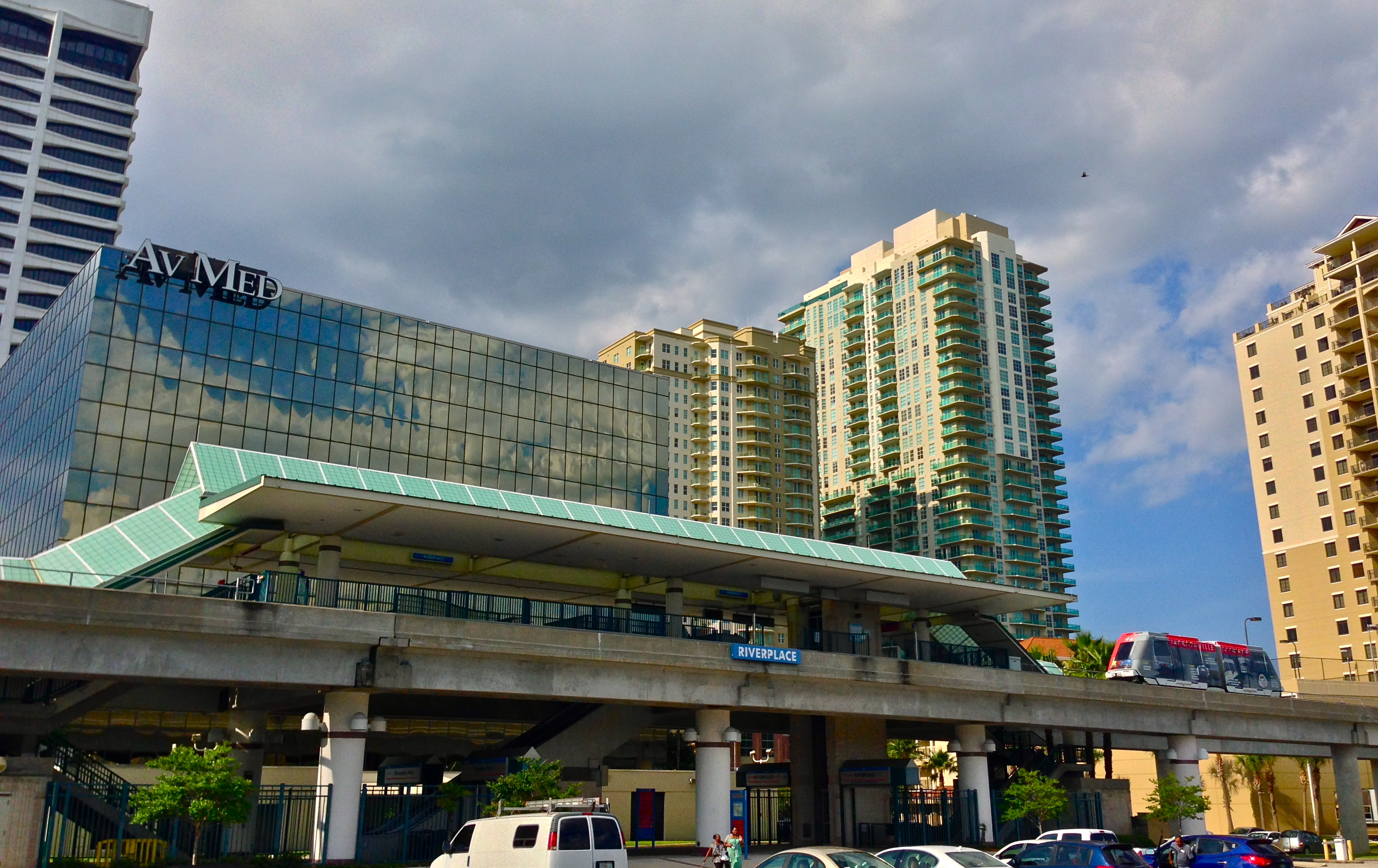
Riverplace Station on the Southbank Line of the Jacksonville Skyway

Downtown is served by the Jacksonville Transportation Authority's zero-fare automated people mover system (known as the "Skyway") and an extensive bus network. The Skyway has the following stations:

Current Skyway Stations

- Rosa L. Parks/FSCJ located at the northernmost extent of downtown, serving Florida State College at Jacksonville and the neighborhood of Springfield.
- James Weldon Johnson Park at Hogan Street & Duval Street, serving City Hall, U.S. Federal Courthouse, and Main Library.
- Central at Hogan Street & Bay Street, serving TIAA Bank Center, Omni Hotel, Jacksonville Landing, Bank of America Tower, and BB&T Tower.
- Jefferson at Jefferson Street & Bay Street, serving the Federal Reserve Building and Courthouse.
- Convention Center on Bay Street serving the Prime F. Osborn III Convention Center.
- San Marco near the Acosta Bridge on San Marco Blvd. It serves the Museum of Science and History, Baptist Medical Center, and the Prudential Building.
- Riverplace on Flagler Ave services Riverplace Tower.
- Kings Avenue at Kings Ave & Prudential Dr and is the southern terminus of the Skyway

Downtown is also home to Greyhound's Jacksonville bus terminal.

=== Bridges ===
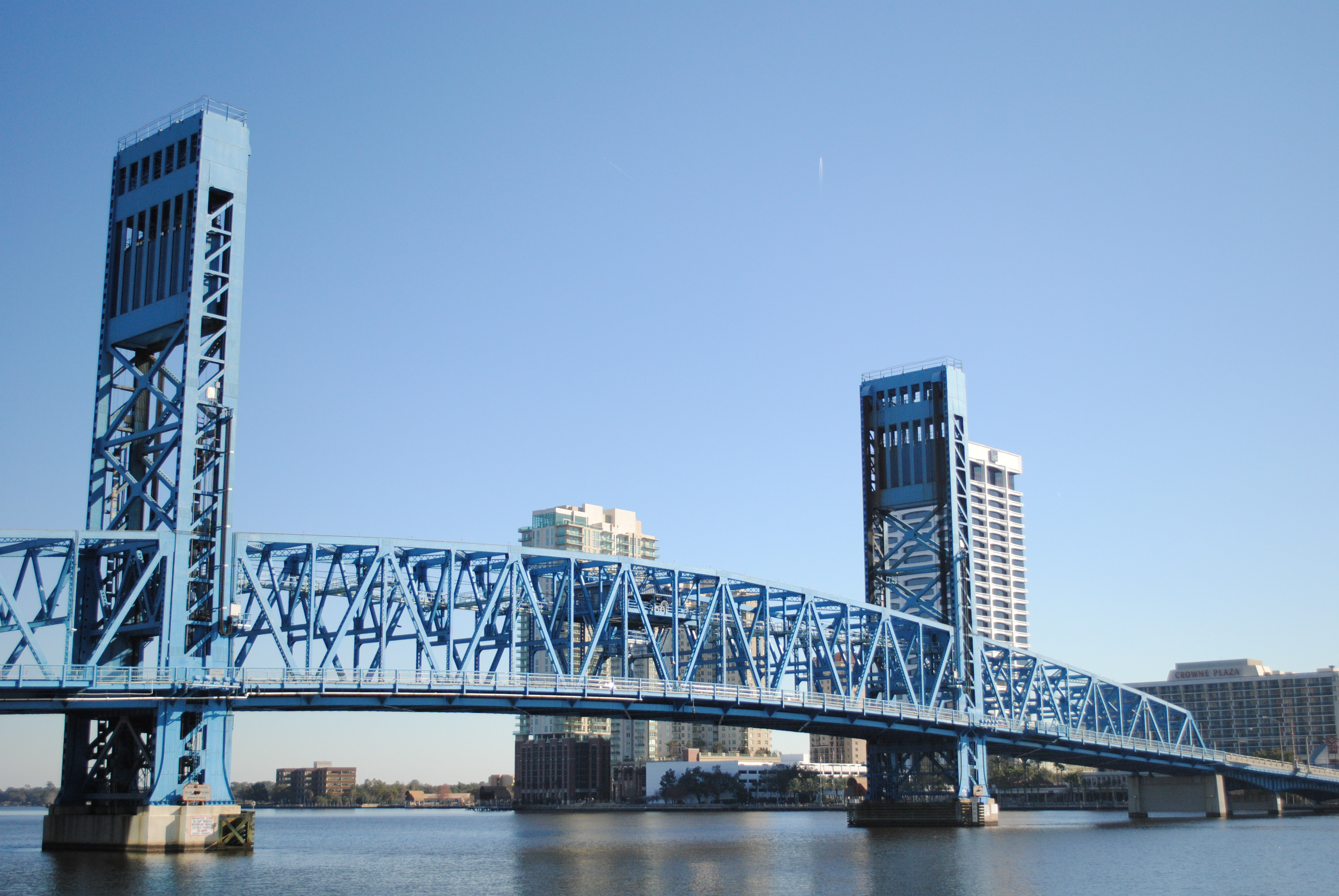
Main Street Bridge

Jacksonville is nicknamed "The River City". Historically, life in the city existed around the economic activity along the shores of the St. Johns River. Downtown lies on a portion of river that narrows before it empties out into the Atlantic Ocean. The areas strategic location makes it home to a high concentration of bridges. Just in Downtown, there are 5 bridges (listed below) connecting the two halves of Duval County.

- Fuller Warren Bridge
- Acosta Bridge
- Main Street Bridge
- Hart Bridge
- Mathews Bridge

=== Highways ===
Major roadways serving Downtown from the suburbs include (I-10) from Baldwin, (I-95) North from the airport area, (I-95) South from St. Augustine, Arlington Expressway from the Beaches, and the Hart Expressway from the Southside area. Other important roadways are U.S. Route 1, U.S. Route 17, and U.S. Route 90. Downtown is also the southern terminus of U.S. Route 23.

== See also ==
- Neighborhoods of Jacksonville
- Architecture of Jacksonville
- National Register of Historic Places listings in Duval County, Florida
