= First Coast Flyer =

Bus rapid transit system in Jacksonville, Florida

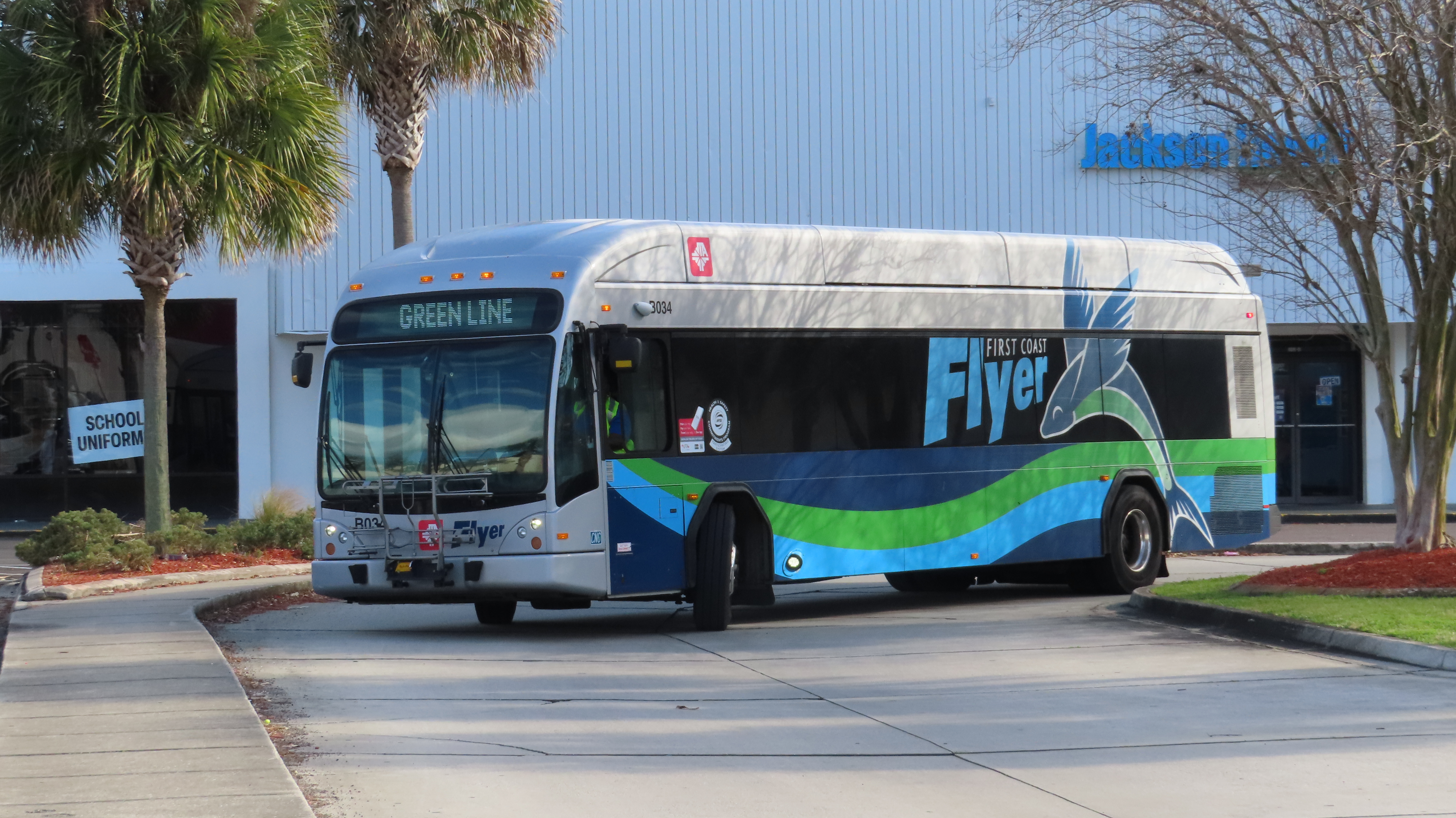
- First Coast Flyer bus at the Gateway Hub on the Green Line

Overview
- Operator: Jacksonville Transportation Authority
- Depot: Myrtle Avenue Operations Campus
- Status: Operating
- Began service: December 7, 2015

Routes
- Routes: 4
- Locale: Jacksonville, Florida
- Length: 58 mi (93 km)
- Stations: 50 (as of September 2021)

The First Coast Flyer is a bus rapid transit (BRT) system in Jacksonville, Florida, owned and operated by the Jacksonville Transportation Authority (JTA). It currently consists of four radial routes running north, southwest, southeast, and east from the Jacksonville Regional Transportation Center in Downtown Jacksonville, where it connects to the Jacksonville Skyway. The first phase, including stations in Downtown Jacksonville and the northbound Green Line, opened in December 2015, with the southbound Blue Line opening in 2016. Additional phases, including the eastbound Red Line and southwestern Orange Line opened in 2018 and 2021, respectively.

== History and planning ==
The Jacksonville Transportation Authority began studying building a rapid transit system for Jacksonville in 2000, and identified bus rapid transit as the best fit for some corridors. The North Florida Transportation Planning Organization added the BRT system to the city's long-range plan. After years of planning, the system, named the First Coast Flyer, broke ground in 2014 with transit improvements in Downtown Jacksonville. The system opened on December 7, 2015, with service Downtown and on the Green Line, running north to Interstate 295. About a year after the system opened, the Blue Line opened for service, running south to The Avenues at the intersection of U.S. 1 (Philips Highway) and Southside Boulevard near Interstate 95.

== Routes ==
Currently, the First Coast Flyer serves stations in Downtown Jacksonville and along the Green, Blue, Red, and Orange Lines.

Downtown service runs on Northbound and Southbound routes, and features twelve stations and dedicated lanes for its buses. Downtown service runs from the Jacksonville Regional Transportation Center (next to the Prime F. Osborn III Convention Center), north to the Rosa Parks Transit Station, and south to a station at Kings Avenue on the Southbank.

=== Green Line ===
The North Corridor/Green Line Route 102 runs 9.39 miles north through the Springfield and Northside areas. It runs from the Jacksonville Regional Transportation Center to Interstate 295 at Lem Turner Road. It serves 11 stations.

=== Blue Line ===
The Southeast Corridor/Blue Line Route 107 runs south through the LaVilla, Southbank, San Marco, and Southside areas. It runs from the Jacksonville Regional Transportation Center to The Avenues at the intersection of U.S. 1 (Philips Highway) and Southside Boulevard near Interstate 95. It serves 12 stations.

=== Red Line ===
The Southeast Corridor/Red Line Route 109 runs east from Downtown to Jacksonville Beach along Arlington Expressway, Southside Boulevard and Beach Boulevard. It serves 17 stations.

=== Orange Line ===
The Southwest Corridor/Orange Line Route 105 runs south from the Jacksonville Regional Transportation Center through Riverside and Avondale to Orange Park Mall along Blanding Boulevard. It serves 13 stations.
