= James Weldon Johnson Park station =

Jacksonville Skyway monorail station in Florida, United States

James Weldon Johnson Park
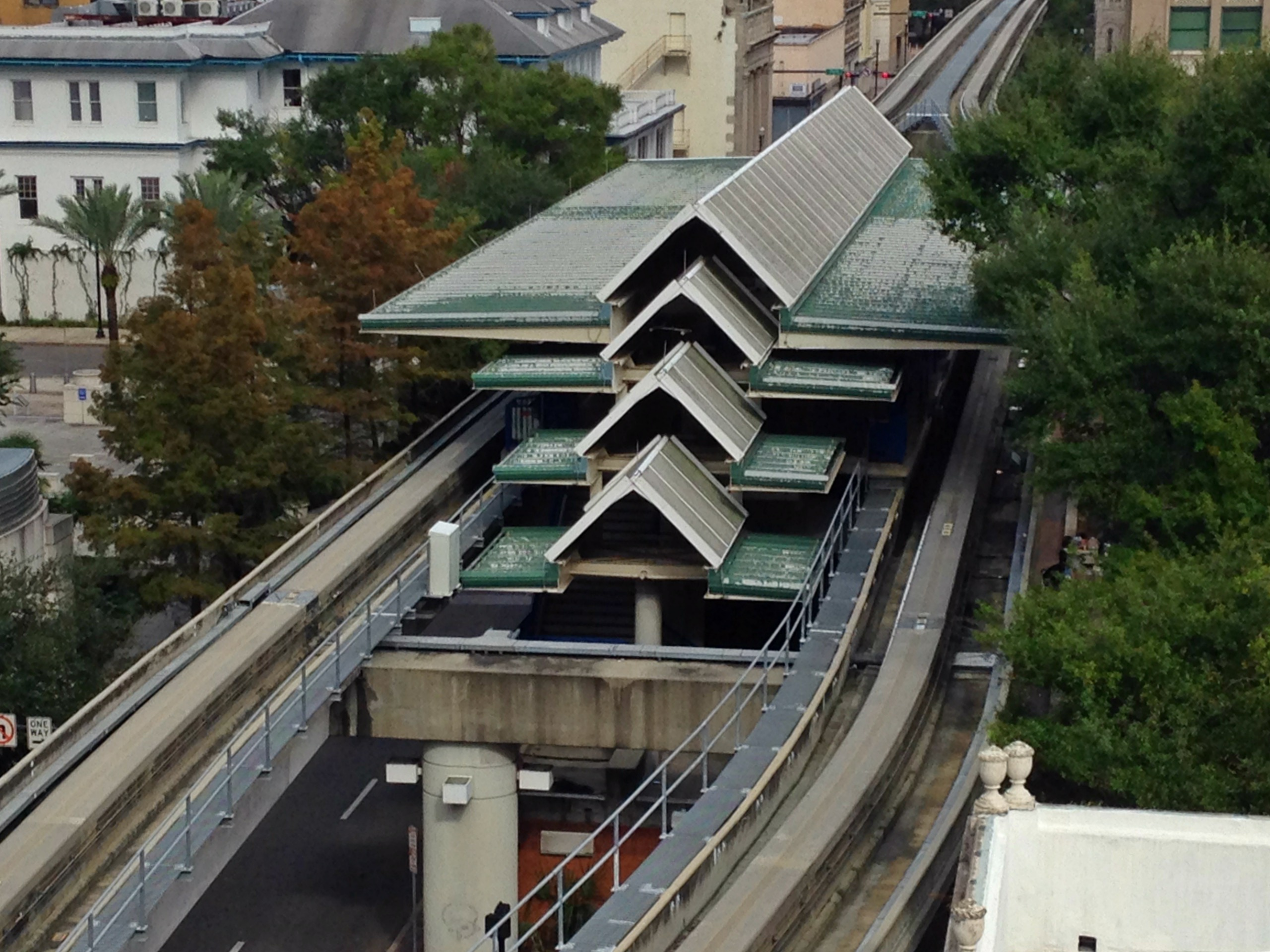

General information
- Location: 301 Hogan Street; Jacksonville, Florida
- Coordinates: 30°19′46.03″N 81°39′35.41″W
- Owner: Jacksonville Transportation Authority
- Platforms: 1 island platform
- Tracks: 2

Construction
- Structure type: Elevated
- Accessible: Yes

History
- Opened: December 15, 1997
- Former names: Hemming Park (1997–2020)

Services
Preceding station	Jacksonville Transportation Authority	Following station
Central toward LaVilla	Skyway	Rosa Parks Terminus
Location

James Weldon Johnson Park station (Note: Also signed as James Weldon Johnson Plaza station) (formerly Hemming Plaza station (Note: Also signed as Hemming Park station prior to renaming)) is a Skyway monorail station in downtown Jacksonville, Florida. It is located on Hogan Street between Duval Street and Monroe Street, adjacent to James Weldon Johnson Park. It is the nearest Skyway station to Jacksonville City Hall, Jacksonville Main Library, the Museum of Contemporary Art Jacksonville, and the John Milton Bryan Simpson United States Courthouse.

== History ==
Hemming Plaza station was built as part of the northward extension of the Skyway to FCCJ, which began construction in 1993. It opened for revenue service on December 15, 1997.

The station was renamed in 2020, when its namesake park (originally named for Confederate soldier Charles Hemming) was renamed in honor of writer and civil rights activist James Weldon Johnson.
