= New Town (Jacksonville) =

- Neighborhood of Jacksonville
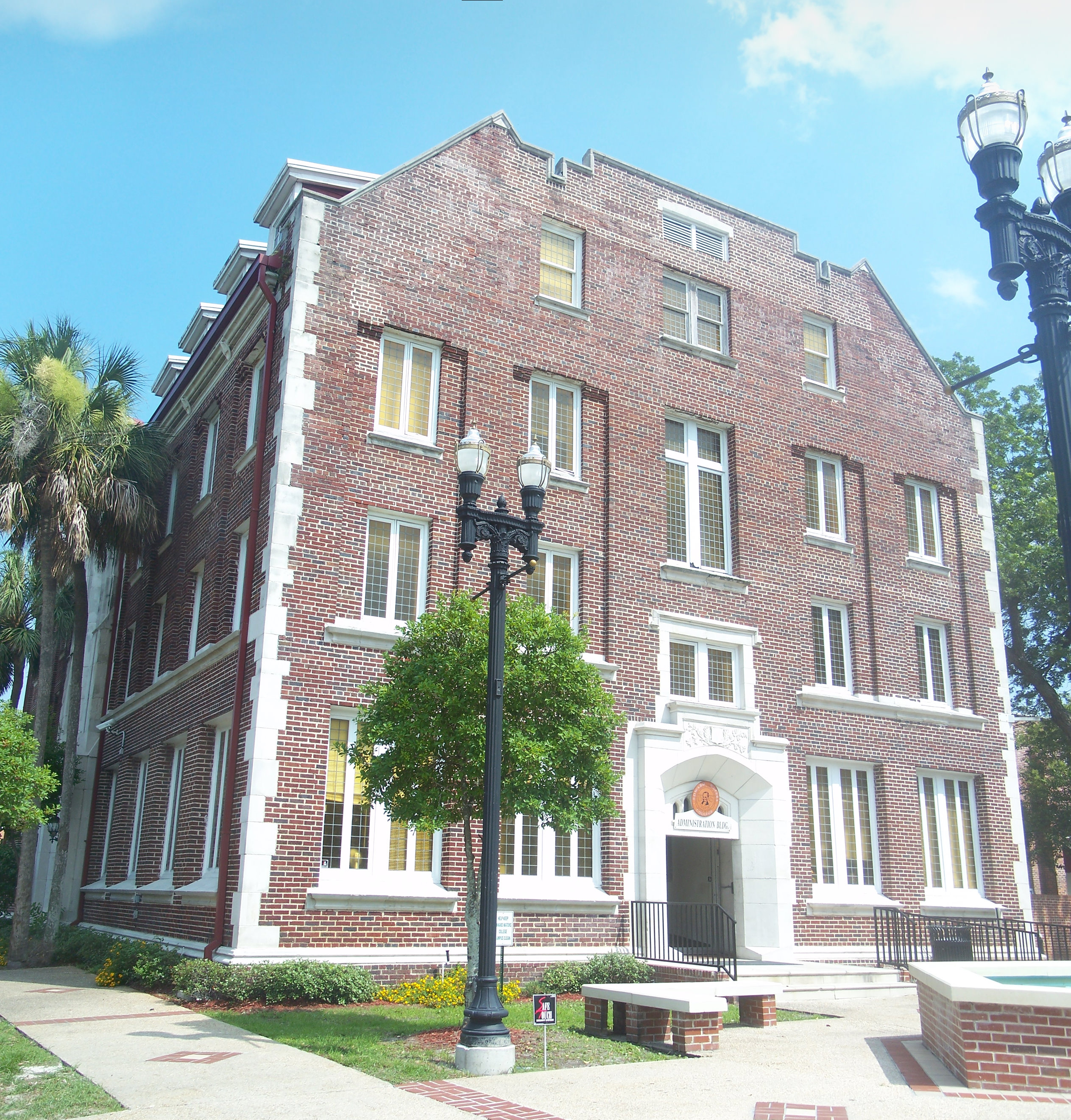
- Edward Waters College located in the northern portion of New Town

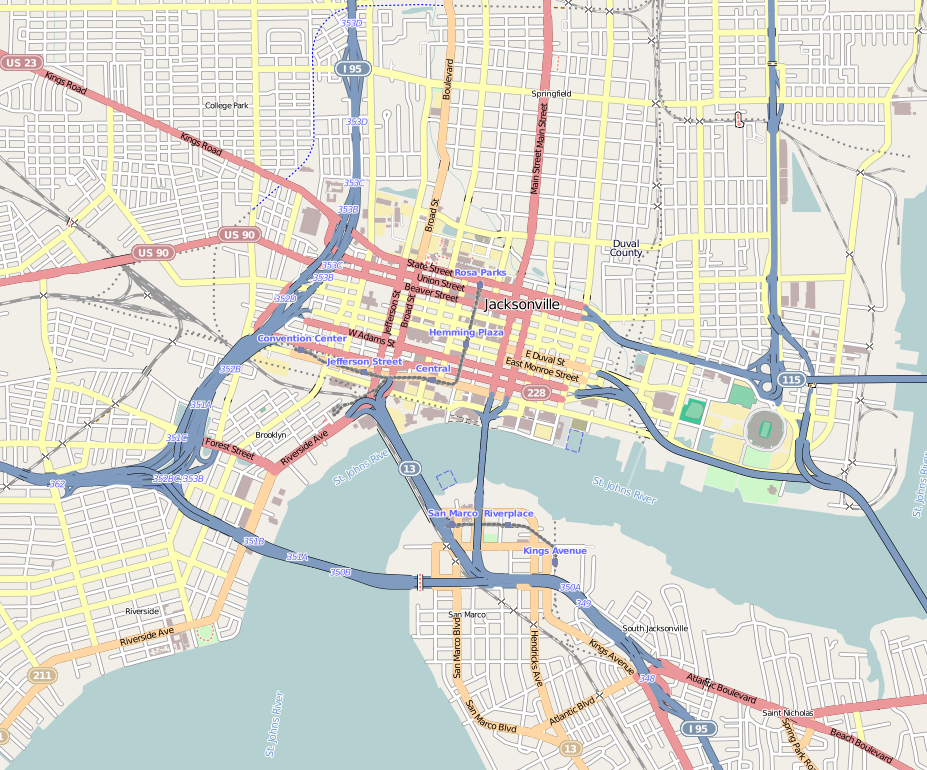
- Location within Central Jacksonville
- Coordinates: 30.3392°N 81.6808°W

Government
  - City Council: Garrett Dennis; Sam Newby
  - State Assembly: Tracie Davis
  - State Senate: Audrey Gibson
  - U.S. House: Al Lawson (D)
- ZIP Code: 32209
- Area code(s): 904, 324
- Website: Newtownsuccesszone.com

New Town is a neighborhood of Jacksonville, Florida. A primarily residential neighborhood, it is located in Jacksonville's Urban Core, immediately northwest of Downtown.

== History ==
New Town was developed in the early 20th century for African-American workers in the railroads and industrial areas to the east, south and west. The neighborhood is home to Edward Waters College, Florida's oldest historically black college. By the 21st century, the neighborhood show considerable signs of urban decay, with residents plagued by crime, failing schools, health problems, and endemic poverty.

== Success zone ==
In 2008, Jacksonville mayor John Peyton and other parties established the New Town Success Zone, modeled after New York City's Harlem Children's Zone, which provides comprehensive social and educational programs and services to children in the neighborhood.

== Habitat build ==
In 2012 a completed HabiJax home was furnished and decorated by a local interior designer as a model for the revitalization of the neighborhood. The project, which constructed more than 100 new homes, was completed in 2012.

== Location ==
New Town is located in the city's Urban Core, immediately northwest of Downtown. It is bounded by King Street to the north, I-95 to the west, Seminary Street to the east, and Beaver Street to the south.
