= Prime F. Osborn III Convention Center =

Convention center in Jacksonville, Florida

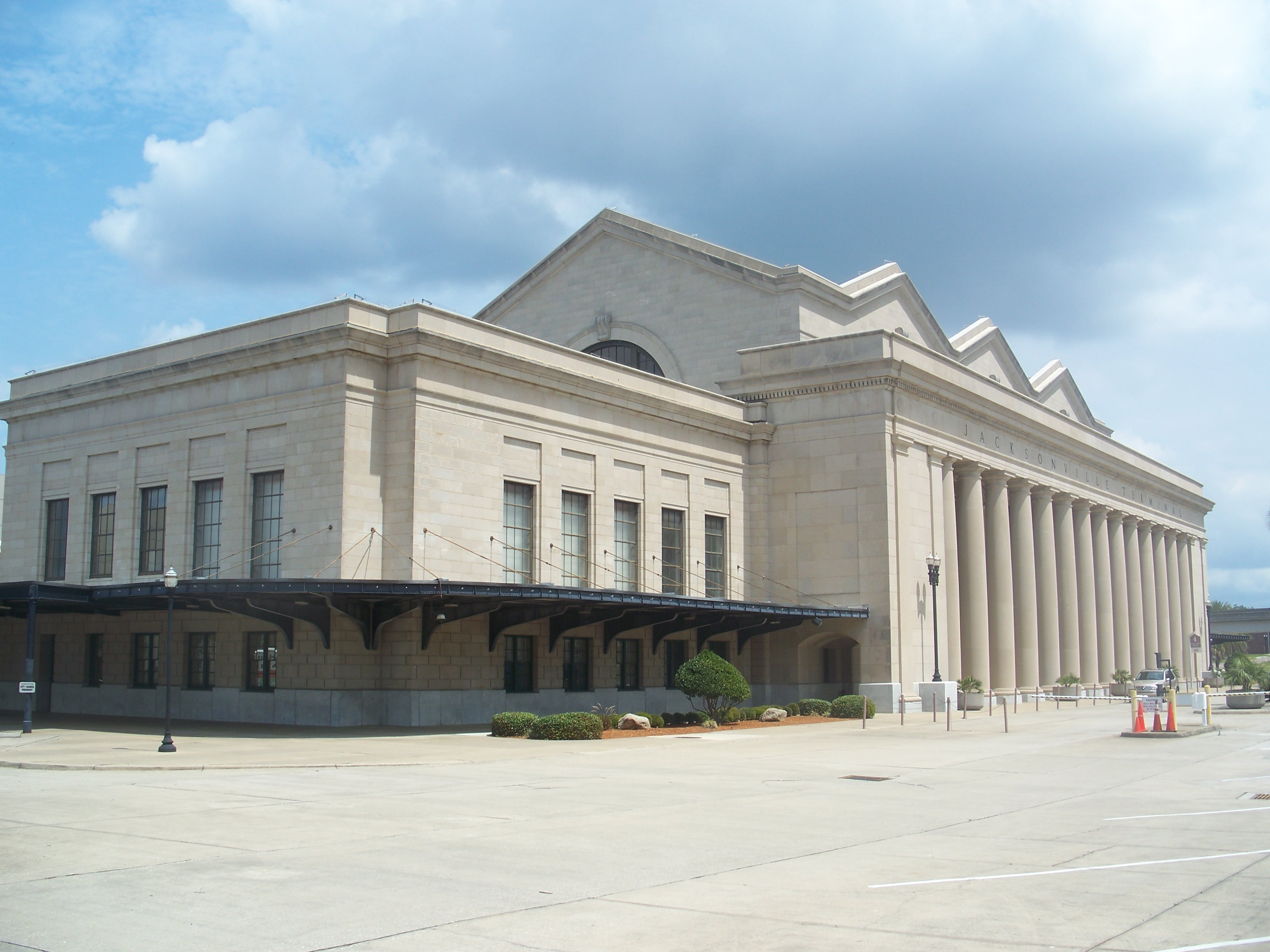
- Interactive map of Prime F. Osborn III Convention Center
- Former names: Union Station
- Address: 1000 Water Street
- Location: Jacksonville, Florida
- Coordinates: 30.32788°N 81.6713°W
- Owner: City of Jacksonville
- Public transit: Monorail: JRTC at LaVilla

Construction
- Built: 1919
- Opened: October 17, 1986

Website
- jaxevents.com
- Jacksonville Terminal Complex
- U.S. National Register of Historic Places
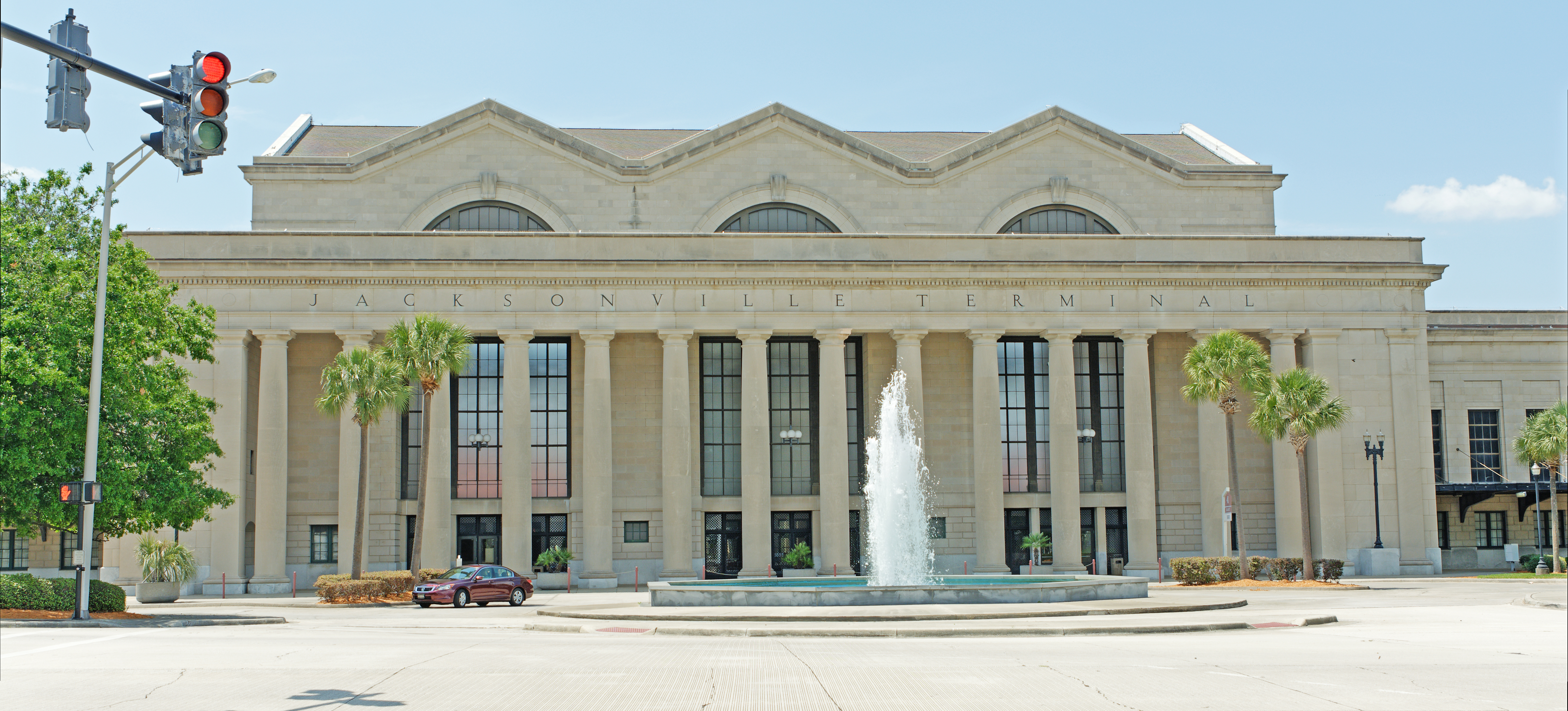
- Front

- Location within Florida Location within the United States
- Location: Jacksonville, Florida
- Architect: Murchison, Kenneth M., Howe, W.B.W.
- Architectural style: Beaux-Arts
- NRHP reference No.: 76000590
- Added to NRHP: 1976

Prime F. Osborn III Convention Center is a 265,000-square-foot (24,600 m^{2}) convention center located in downtown Jacksonville, Florida. Opened in 1986, it was built incorporating Jacksonville Terminal Complex / Union Station as well as several thousand square feet of newly built structure.

Located in the Jacksonville neighborhood of LaVilla, the Prime Osborn contains two exhibition halls totaling 78,500 square feet (7,290 m^{2}), several ballrooms and meetings rooms. The City of Jacksonville is looking to replace the Prime Osborn within the next decade, with a larger 500,000+ square foot convention center in downtown Jacksonville. The JTA Skyway's LaVilla station is located across the street.

The Convention Center was added to the National Register of Historic Places in 1976.

== History ==
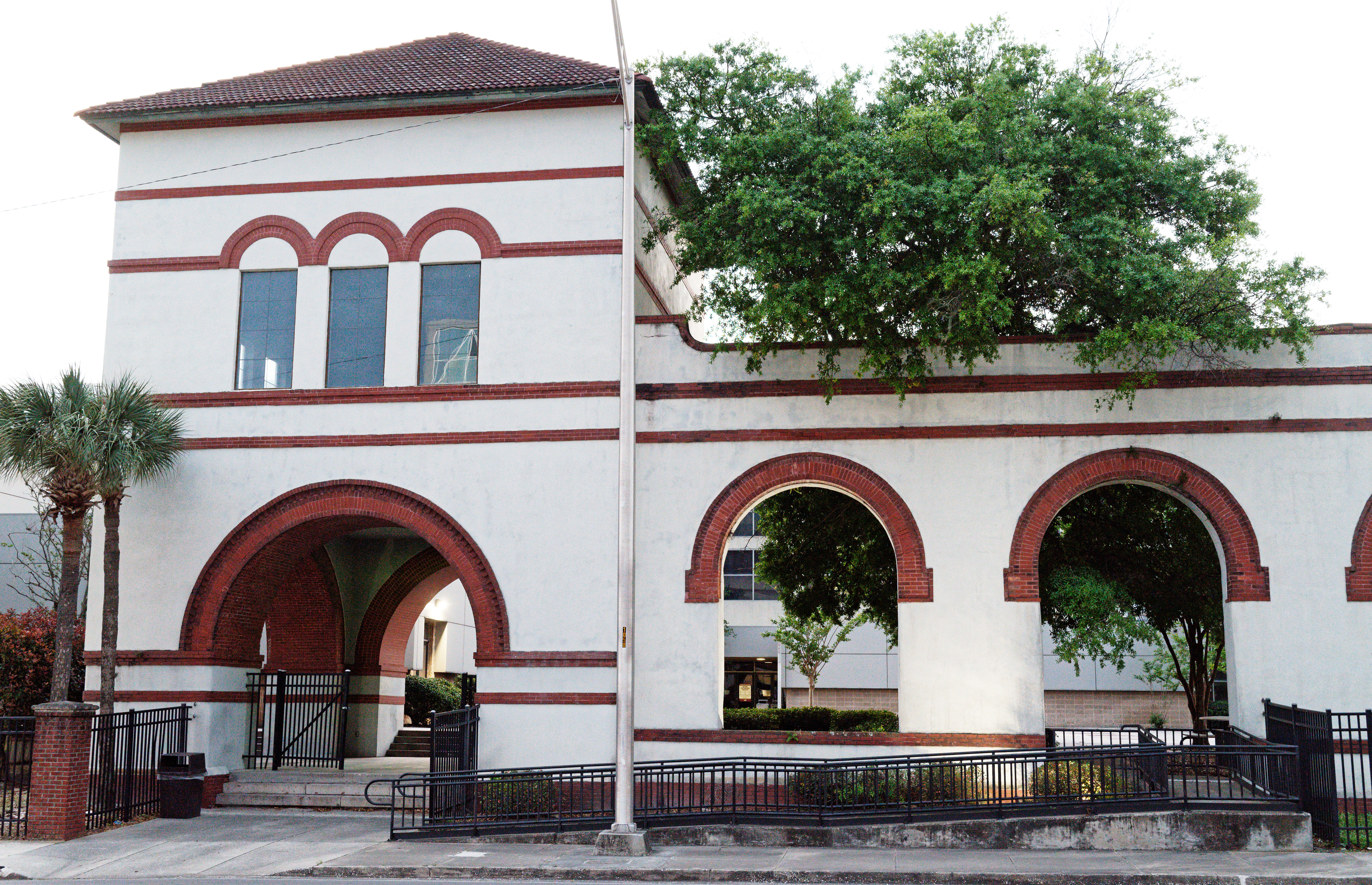
Part of the last remaining segment of the original Union Depot, which opened in 1895

LaVilla, at that time a suburb of Jacksonville, was for many years an important railroad hub. The first union station in the area was built by the Savannah, Florida and Western Railway (later part of the Atlantic Coast Line Railroad) in 1883. The Jacksonville, Tampa and Key West Railway (also later part of the ACL) began to use it in 1884. Other terminals served the Florida Central and Peninsular Railroad (later part of the Seaboard Air Line Railroad), the Florida East Coast Railway, and the Georgia Southern and Florida Railway.

The company was incorporated in 1894 by Henry Flagler, who owned the Florida East Coast Railway. Its first Union Depot opened on February 4, 1895, and was completed on January 15, 1897. It came to be known as the Flagler Depot. Ownership was split between five railroad companies, Atlantic Coast Line Railroad, Florida East Coast Railway, and Seaboard Air Line Railroad each with 25% ownership, Southern Railway and Georgia Southern and Florida Railway each with 12.5% ownership.

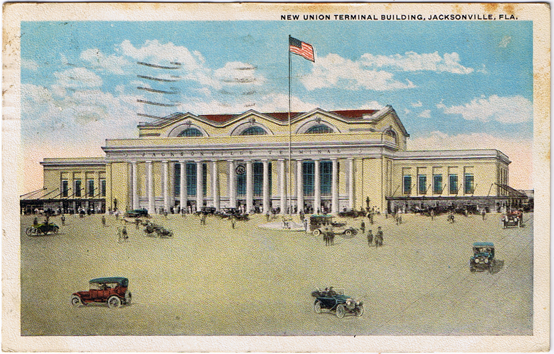
New Union Terminal, opened in 1919

When the second Union Station opened in 1919 (on the site of the original one), it was the largest railroad station in the South. At its peak, the terminal handled as many as 142 trains and 20,000 passengers a day. Some of the passenger trains handled in Jacksonville were 18 to 22 railcars long. Within the terminal, there was a restaurant, snack bars, news stands, a barber shop, florist, a drug store, and gift shops. The Jacksonville terminal had 32 tracks. 29 of those tracks were passenger tracks with platforms. Of those, 1-15 were stub or "head" tracks, which ended at the bumper posts. (Some of these massive decorative concrete posts still stand within the Convention Center Concourse).

The station was last used on January 3, 1974; Amtrak moved to a new smaller station on the Northside. In 1982, a public-private partnership was started, led by former CSX chairman Prime F. Osborn III. The new convention center opened on October 17, 1986.

== Future and proposed projects ==
First Coast Commuter Rail is a proposed passenger rail system serving Jacksonville and the Northeast Florida region. It is currently in the early planning stages. Three routes were analyzed in depth: north to Yulee, southwest to Green Cove Springs, FL, and southeast to St. Augustine, FL.

Brightline is an inter-city passenger rail system between Miami and Orlando. Jacksonville is a likely expansion point for the near future, as the FEC Railway already owns the tracks running there.

== See also ==
- Architecture of Jacksonville
- List of convention centers in the United States
- Northeast Florida Commuter Rail

Preceding station	Amtrak	Following station
Terminus	Carolina Special 1973	Savannah toward New York
DeLand toward St. Petersburg	Champion	Thalmann toward New York
DeLand toward St. Petersburg	Floridian	Waycross toward Chicago
Waldo toward Miami	Floridian	Waycross toward Chicago
Waldo toward Miami	Silver Meteor	Savannah toward New York
Waldo toward Miami	Silver Star	Savannah toward New York
Preceding station	Atlantic Coast Line Railroad	Following station
Wessner toward Tampa	Main Line	Dinsmore toward Richmond
Wessner toward Camp Johnston	Camp Johnston Branch	Terminus
Cambon toward St. Petersburg	Ocala District	Terminus
Preceding station	Florida East Coast Railway	Following station
South Jacksonville toward Miami	Main Line	Terminus
South Jacksonville toward Mayport	Jacksonville – Mayport	Terminus
Preceding station	Seaboard Air Line Railroad	Following station
Marietta toward Tampa or Miami	Main Line	Panama toward Richmond
Marietta toward River Junction	Tallahassee Subdivision	Terminus
Terminus	Jacksonville – Fernandina	Panama toward Fernandina
Preceding station	Southern Railway	Following station
Grand Crossing toward Chattanooga	Chattanooga – Jacksonville	Terminus
