= Rosa Parks Transit Station =

Intermodal transit station in Jacksonville, Florida, United States

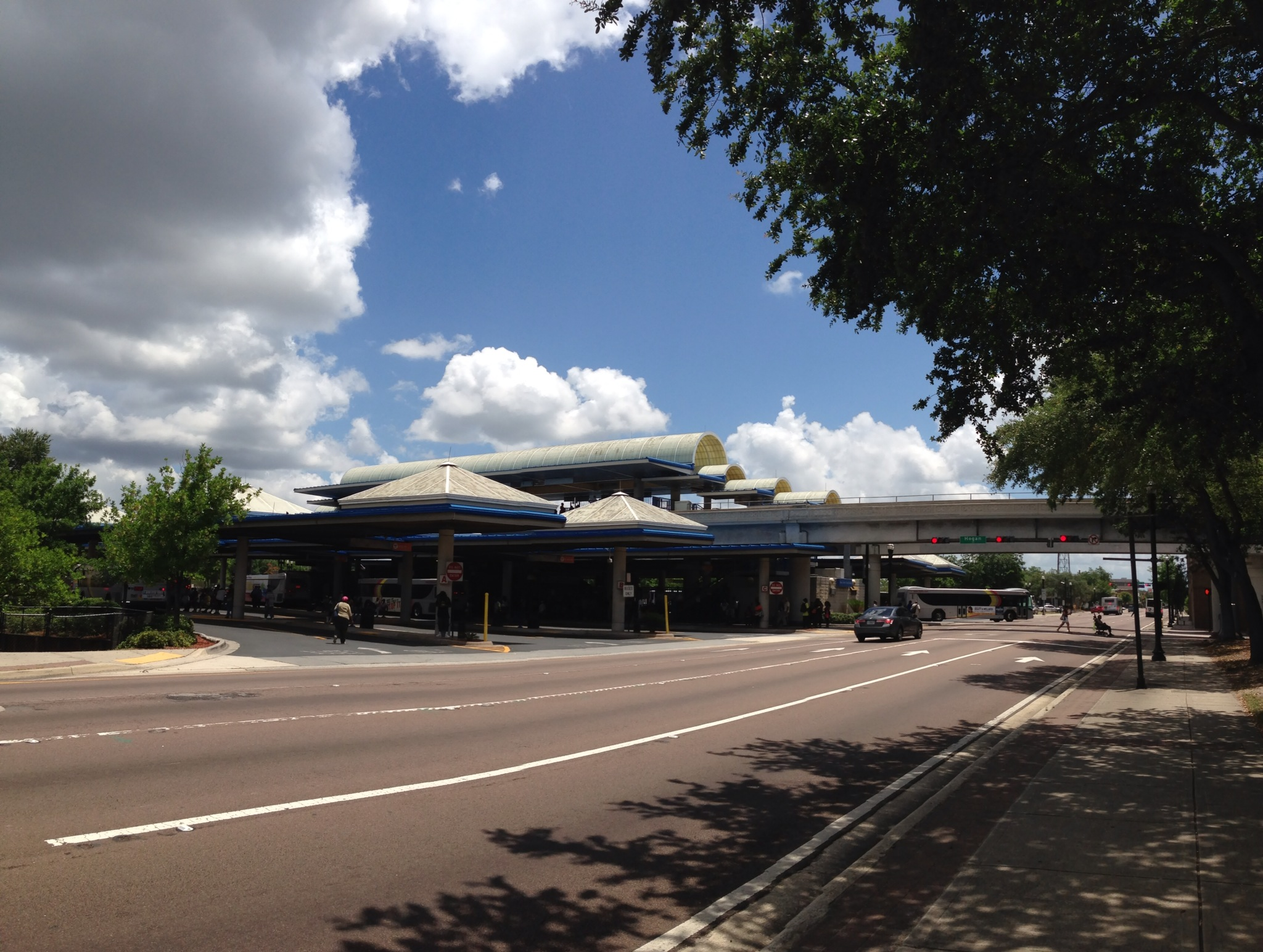

General information
- Location: 201 Union Street West; Jacksonville, Florida, United States
- Coordinates: 30°20′00″N 81°39′32″W
- Owner: Jacksonville Transportation Authority
- Platforms: 1 island platform
- Tracks: 2
- Connections: JTA Bus: 10, 19; First Coast Flyer: Red

Construction
- Structure type: Ground level and elevated
- Accessible: Yes

History
- Opened: December 15, 1997
- Former names: FCCJ (1997–2006); Rosa Parks/FCCJ (2006–2009)

Services
Preceding station	Jacksonville Transportation Authority	Following station
James Weldon Johnson Park toward LaVilla	Skyway	Terminus
Location

Rosa Parks Transit Station is an intermodal transit station in downtown Jacksonville, Florida, served by Jacksonville Transportation Authority (JTA) buses and formerly the Skyway monorail. It served as the northern terminus of the Skyway, and previously served as the main transfer hub of the JTA bus network. It is located on Hogan Street near Union Street, across the street from the Downtown campus of Florida State College at Jacksonville.

== History ==
The station was built to serve as the main transfer station for the JTA's local bus system, and as the terminus of the northward extension of the Skyway, which began construction in 1993. It opened for revenue service as FCCJ station on December 15, 1997. Upon opening, it included 18 bus bays at ground level, below the elevated Skyway platform, and was acclaimed and awarded for its architectural design.

FCCJ station was renamed Rosa Parks/FCCJ on August 28, 2006, in a ceremony attended by Congresswoman Corrine Brown; it was shortened to its current name in 2009.

The station served as the main hub of the JTA bus network until May 2020, when it was replaced by the Jacksonville Regional Transportation Center at LaVilla at the opposite end of the Skyway. JTA committed to maintaining bus and Skyway service at Rosa Parks Transit Station, though with a smaller number of routes. Later that year, the eastern half of the station was decommissioned and demolished to prepare for eventual transit-oriented development opportunities. Nine of the station's bus bays remain standing, but as of 2023, only the three closest to the Skyway platform remain in use.
