= Jacksonville Regional Transportation Center at LaVilla =

Intermodal transit station in Jacksonville, Florida, United States

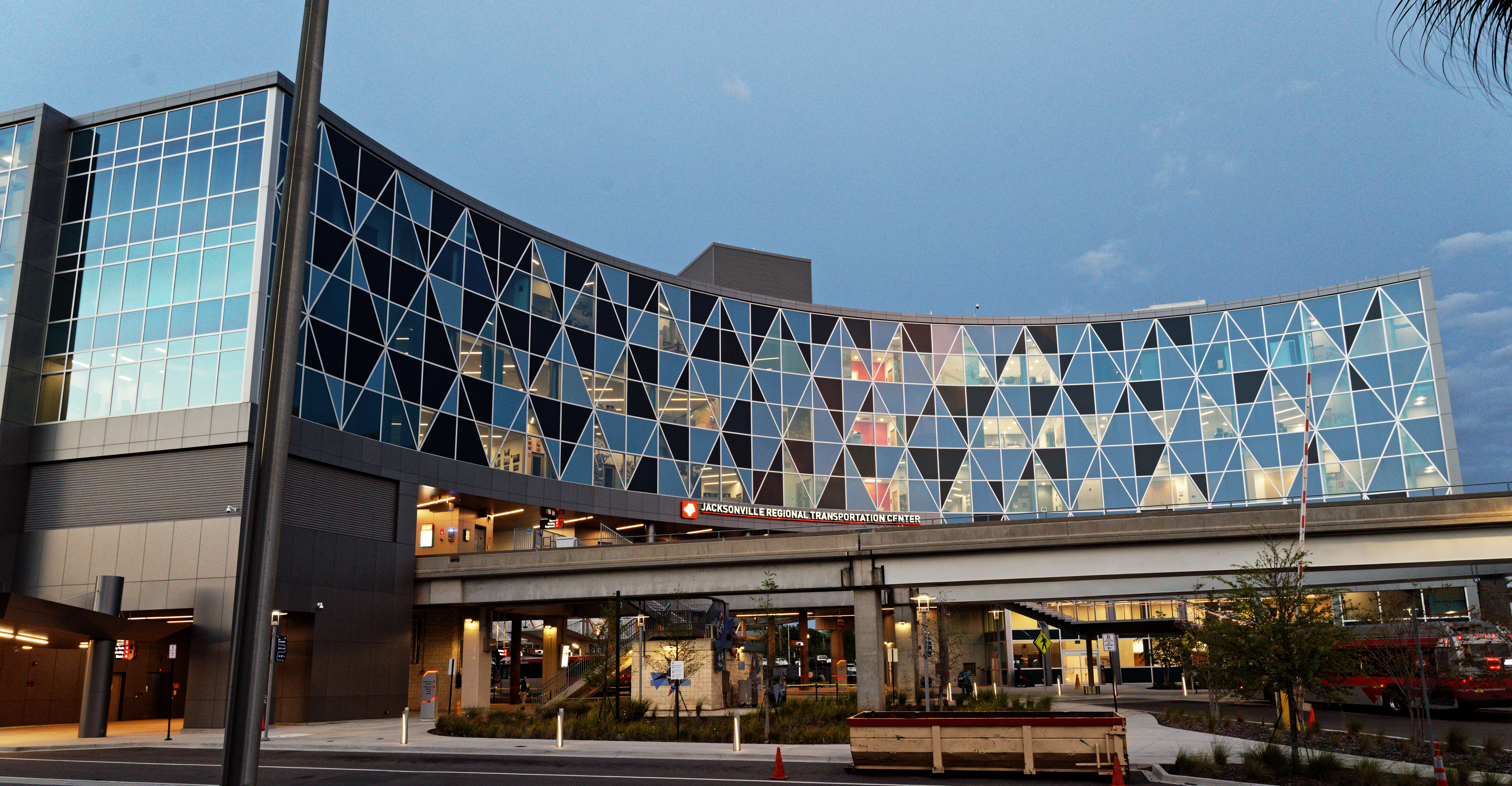

General information
- Location: 100 LaVilla Center Drive; Jacksonville, Florida, U.S.
- Coordinates: 30.329047°N 81.672206°W
- Owner: Jacksonville Transportation Authority
- Platforms: 1 island platform
- Tracks: 2
- Bus routes: JTA Bus: 1, 3, 4, 8A/B, 10, 11, 12, 13, 14, 16, 17, 19, 21, 22, 53, 80, Clay Express Select, Nassau Express Select, St. Johns Express Select; First Coast Flyer: Blue, Green, Orange, Red
- Bus stands: 22
- Connections: Greyhound, Megabus, RedCoach (at Intercity Bus Terminal)

Construction
- Structure type: Ground level and elevated
- Accessible: Yes

History
- Opened: June 1989
- Rebuilt: 1996–1997, 2017–2020
- Former names: Terminal (1989–1999); Convention Center (1999–2017)

Services
Preceding station	Jacksonville Transportation Authority	Following station
First Coast Flyer
Terminus	Green line	Acosta toward Northside
Terminus	Blue line	Acosta toward The Avenues
Terminus	Red line	Acosta toward Jacksonville Beach
Brooklyn toward Orange Park	Orange line	Terminus
Proposed services
Preceding station	Jacksonville Transportation Authority	Following station
Terminus	Southeast Corridor	Avenues Walk toward St. Augustine
Former services
Preceding station	Jacksonville Transportation Authority	Following station
Terminus	Skyway	Jefferson toward Rosa Parks
Location

The Jacksonville Regional Transportation Center at LaVilla (JRTC) is an intermodal transit station in downtown Jacksonville, Florida. It serves as the largest hub of the Jacksonville Transportation Authority (JTA) bus system and the central hub of JTA's First Coast Flyer bus rapid transit (BRT) network, and houses a station on the Jacksonville Skyway and JTA's administrative offices.

It is connected to by a pedestrian bridge to the Intercity Bus Terminal which is served by Greyhound Lines, Megabus, and RedCoach, and is across the street from the Prime F. Osborn III Convention Center.

== History ==
=== Original Skyway station ===
The JRTC stands on the former site of Terminal station, the original western terminus of the Jacksonville Skyway, which opened with the initial 0.7-mile (1.1 km) Phase I-A segment in June 1989. It was named in reference to the Jacksonville Terminal, a former train station that was converted into the Prime F. Osborn III Convention Center in 1986.

All three existing stations were closed from December 1996 until December 1997, when the Skyway was rebuilt as a monorail. Terminal station was renamed Convention Center station in 1999.

The original station was served by an adjacent park and ride lot.

=== Reconstruction ===
The City of Jacksonville had long planned to incorporate the site into an intermodal transit station, with the return of rail service to the Jacksonville Terminal. In May 2017, JTA announced that the station would be closed about two months later for the construction of the Jacksonville Regional Transportation Center (JRTC).

The station reopened as part of the new Jacksonville Regional Transportation Center on May 4, 2020.
