= Jacksonville Transportation Authority =

Agency responsible for public transit in Jacksonville

Coordinates: 30.330763°N 81.676686°W

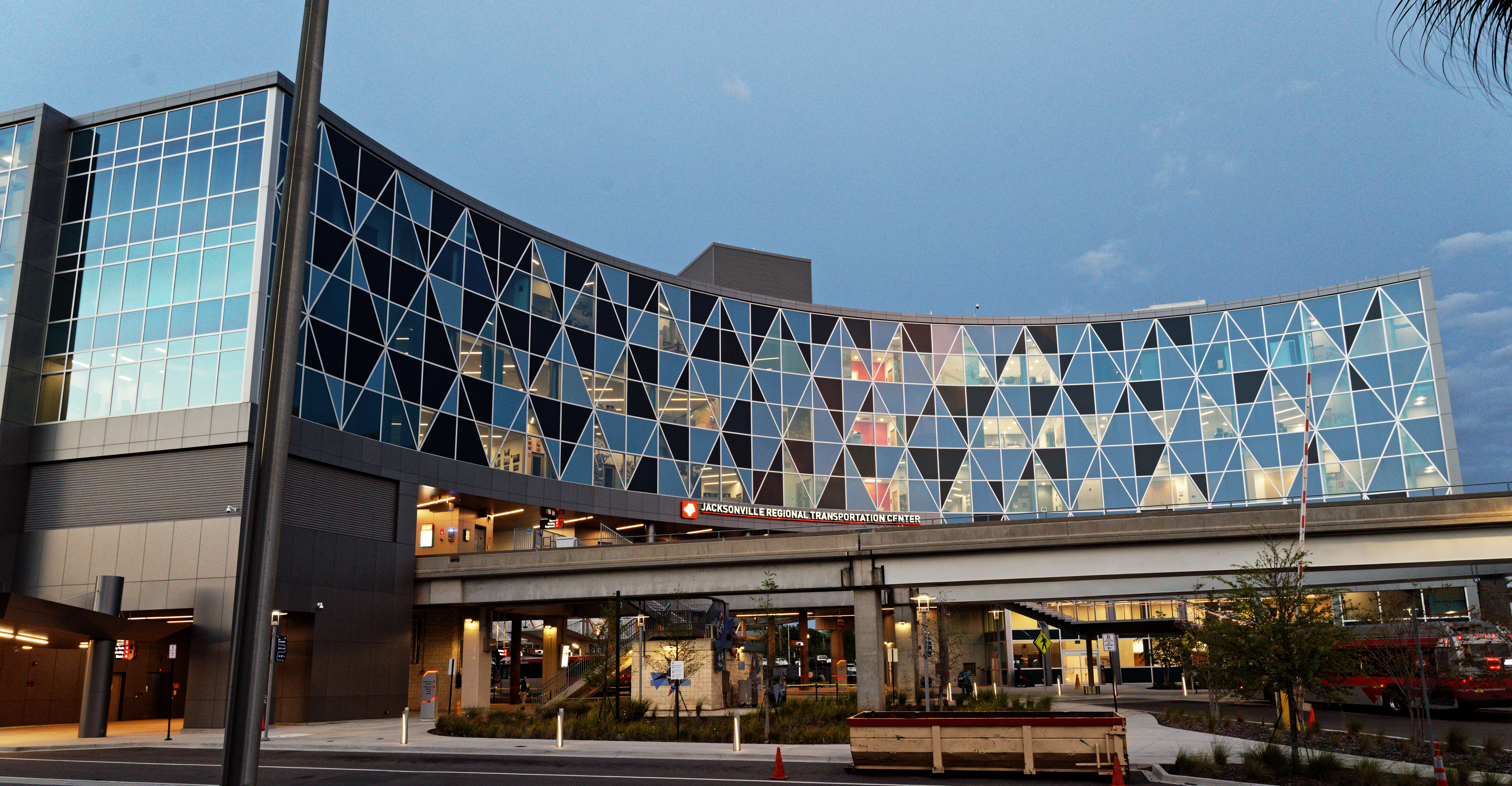
- Jacksonville Transportation Authority headquarters building

Overview
- Locale: Jacksonville, Florida, U.S.
- Transit type: Transit Bus, People Mover, Ferry
- Number of lines: 26 (fixed route bus); 4 (First Coast Flyer)
- Daily ridership: 28,000 (weekdays, Q2 2026)
- Annual ridership: 7,342,300 (2025)
- Headquarters: Jacksonville Regional Transportation Center at LaVilla
- Website: jtafla.com

Operation
- Began operation: 1971 (bus); 1989 (people mover); 2016 (ferry)

The Jacksonville Transportation Authority (JTA) is the independent agency responsible for public transit in the city of Jacksonville, Florida, and roadway infrastructure that connects northeast Florida. However, they do not maintain any roadways. In 2025, the system had a ridership of 7,342,300, or about 28,000 per weekday as of the second quarter of 2026.

== History ==
In 1955, the Florida Legislature established the Jacksonville Expressway Authority. They owned and maintained roads and bridges in Duval County, including several toll bridges, mostly across the St. Johns River. In 1971 the Authority merged with City Coach Company and several smaller private bus companies to form the Jacksonville Transportation Authority.

The following were built by the Expressway Authority or Transportation Authority:

- Union Street Expressway and Mathews Bridge, 1952-1953
- Interstate 95 from exit 348 to exit 358, including the Fuller Warren Bridge and Trout River Bridge, 1954-1960
- Interstate 10 from ? to I-95, 1957-1960
- Roosevelt Expressway, 1960
- Arlington Expressway, 1961
- Haines Street Expressway and 20th Street Expressway, 1961-1962
- Southside Boulevard, 1962–63
- Hart Bridge, Hart Bridge Expressway and Emerson Expressway, 1967
- J. Turner Butler Boulevard, 1972-1979
- JTA Skyway, 1984–1989; phases II & III were completed in 2000
- Dames Point Bridge, 1985-1989 aka Napoleon Bonaparte Broward Bridge

Tolls were charged on the Mathews Bridge, Fuller Warren Bridge, Trout River Bridge and Hart Bridge, and on J. Turner Butler Boulevard. Tolls were removed in 1988, and the Florida Department of Transportation now maintains the bridges and freeways.

== Responsibilities ==
The mission of the JTA is to improve Northeast Florida’s economy, environment and quality of life by providing safe, reliable, efficient and sustainable multimodal transportation services and facilities.

=== Roadway infrastructure ===
The JTA develops and implements construction and financing plans for state and city roads, bridges and interchanges in conjunction with the city government and the Florida Department of Transportation. This was the original role of the Expressway Authority.

=== Public transit ===
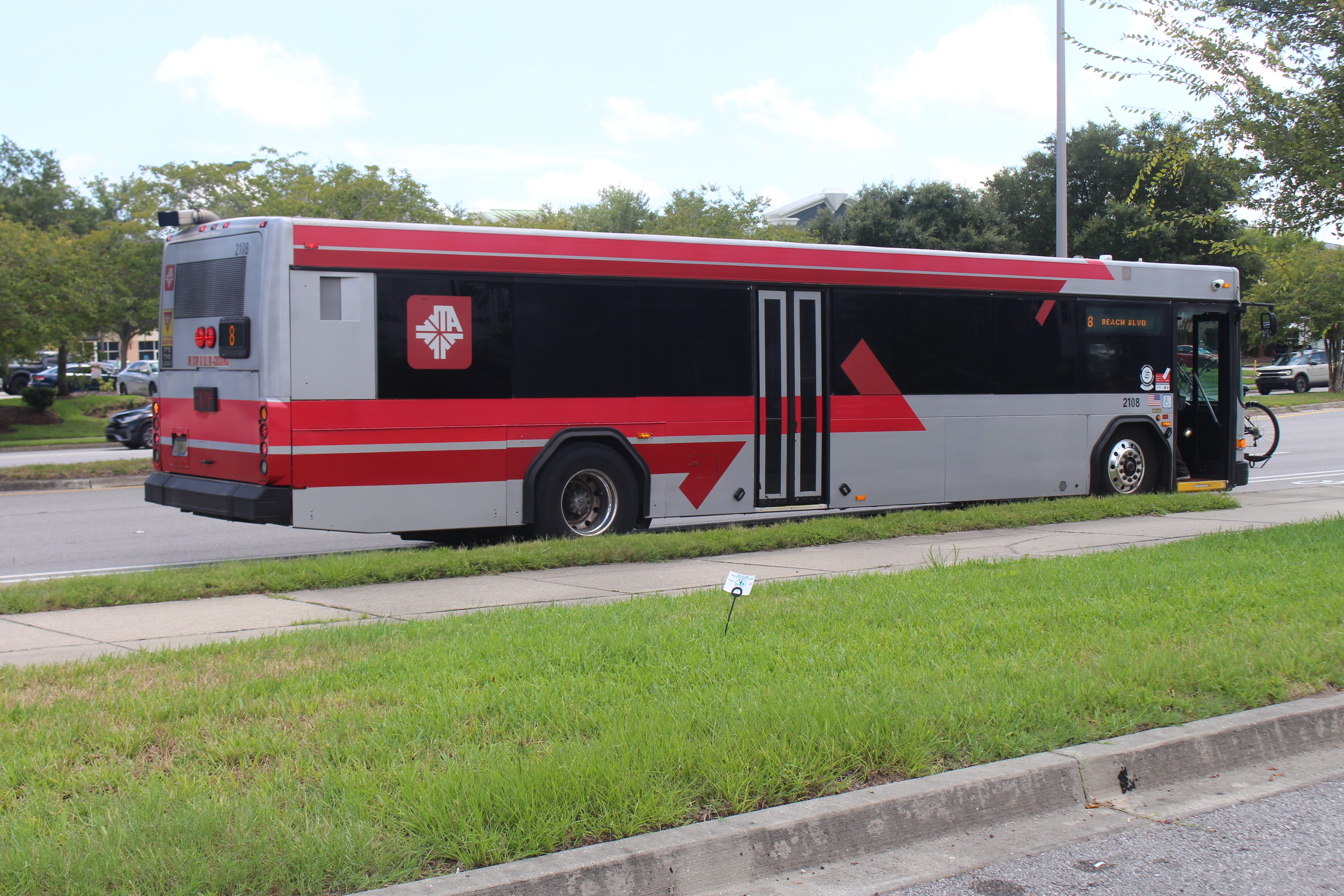
A JTA bus in 2025

As of 2026, JTA operates 147 vehicles on 26 routes in regular bus service. The fare is $1.75 per rider. JTA also operates five once-daily early-morning express routes which originate from an outlying area and go directly to their destination with no intermediate stops, then return in late afternoon. Those fares are $1.50 per rider.

Trolley-replica buses run on the Bay Street, Beaver Street, Riverside, and the Beach trolley. Stadium shuttles transport riders from suburban, downtown and Park-n-Ride locations to Jacksonville Jaguars football games and other events at EverBank Stadium.

In 2016, JTA opened the first line on the First Coast Flyer, its bus rapid transit (BRT) system. The Red route opened in 2018, replacing the Beach Shuttles. All four planned routes are now in operation.

JTA Connexion is a paratransit for the disabled and elderly, provided by private vendors with specially equipped vehicles and drivers.

JTA formerly ran the Jacksonville Skyway, a people mover system which travels 2.5 miles (4.0 km) from the King Street parking garage across the St. Johns River and through the central business district. JTA is undertaking a project to convert the Skyway into an autonomous vehicle network. The first part of Neighborhood Autonomous Vehicle Innovation service began in 2025. However on October 30th, 2026 the Jacksonville Skyway ended service. The termination of service was announced in conjunction with cuts to JTA bus and NAVI services due to a funding gap of $39 million, with NAVI ceasing operations on January 1, 2027.

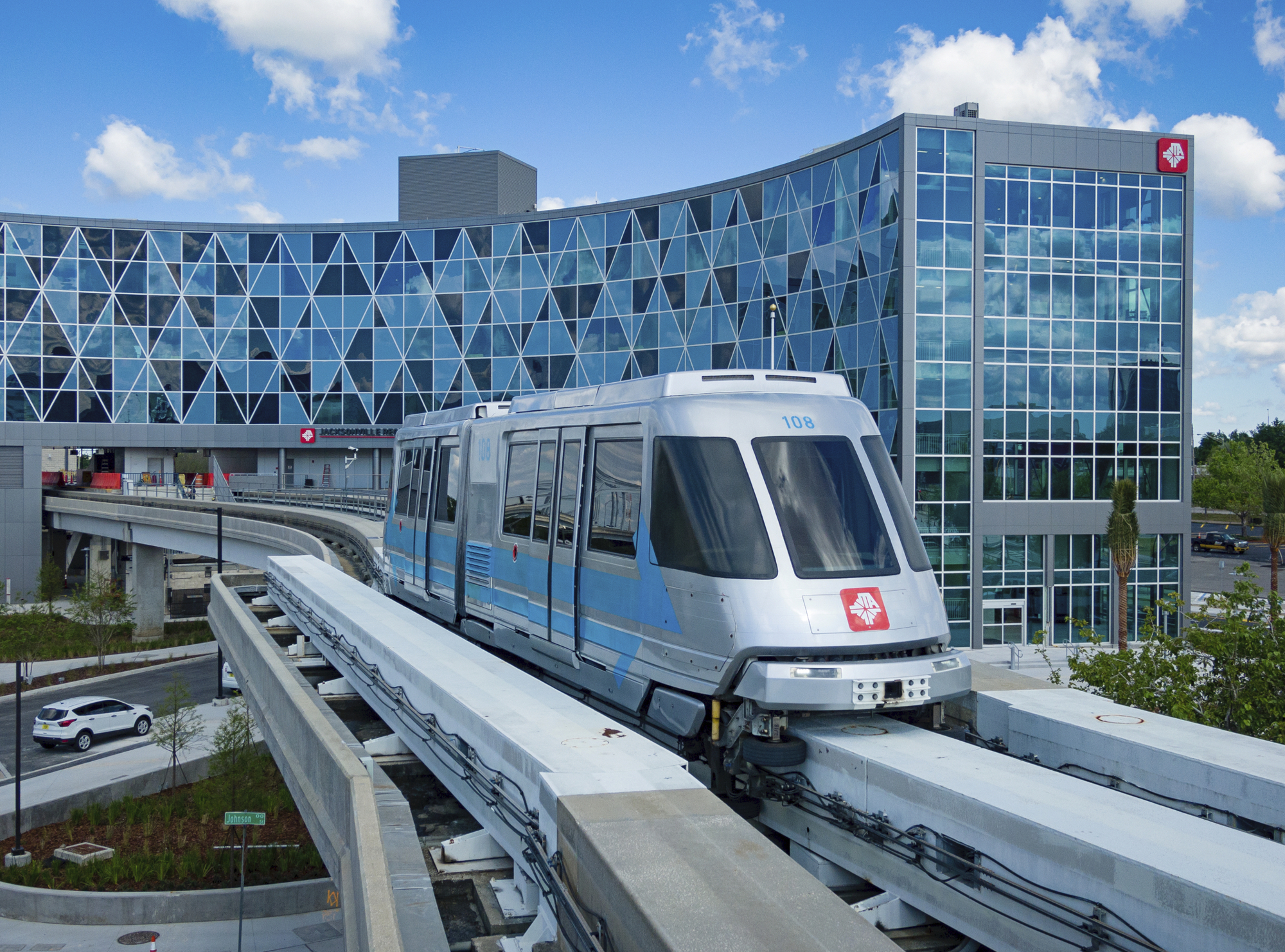
Skyway leaving JRTC in 2020

Jacksonville Regional Transportation Center (JRTC): JTA opened a new intermodal transit center in May, 2020, bringing together Jacksonville Skyway, JTA bus, First Coast Flyer, intercity bus, and rail service in one facility. JRTC replaced the aging and overcrowded Rosa Parks Transit Station. JRTC is situated across the street from the Prime F. Osborn III Convention Center.

Since 2016, JTA has also operated the St. Johns River Ferry a vehicle and pedestrian ferry that operates between Mayport and Fort George Island.

First Coast Commuter Rail: JTA is undertaking evaluations for a future commuter rail system.

=== Hurricanes ===
The JTA has the responsibility to identify, plan and prepare Jacksonville's hurricane evacuation routes. The JTA and the city of Jacksonville established a Hurricane Preparedness Plan that will provide emergency evacuation/patient transport and move civilians and/or emergency service personnel with mass transit.

== Routes ==
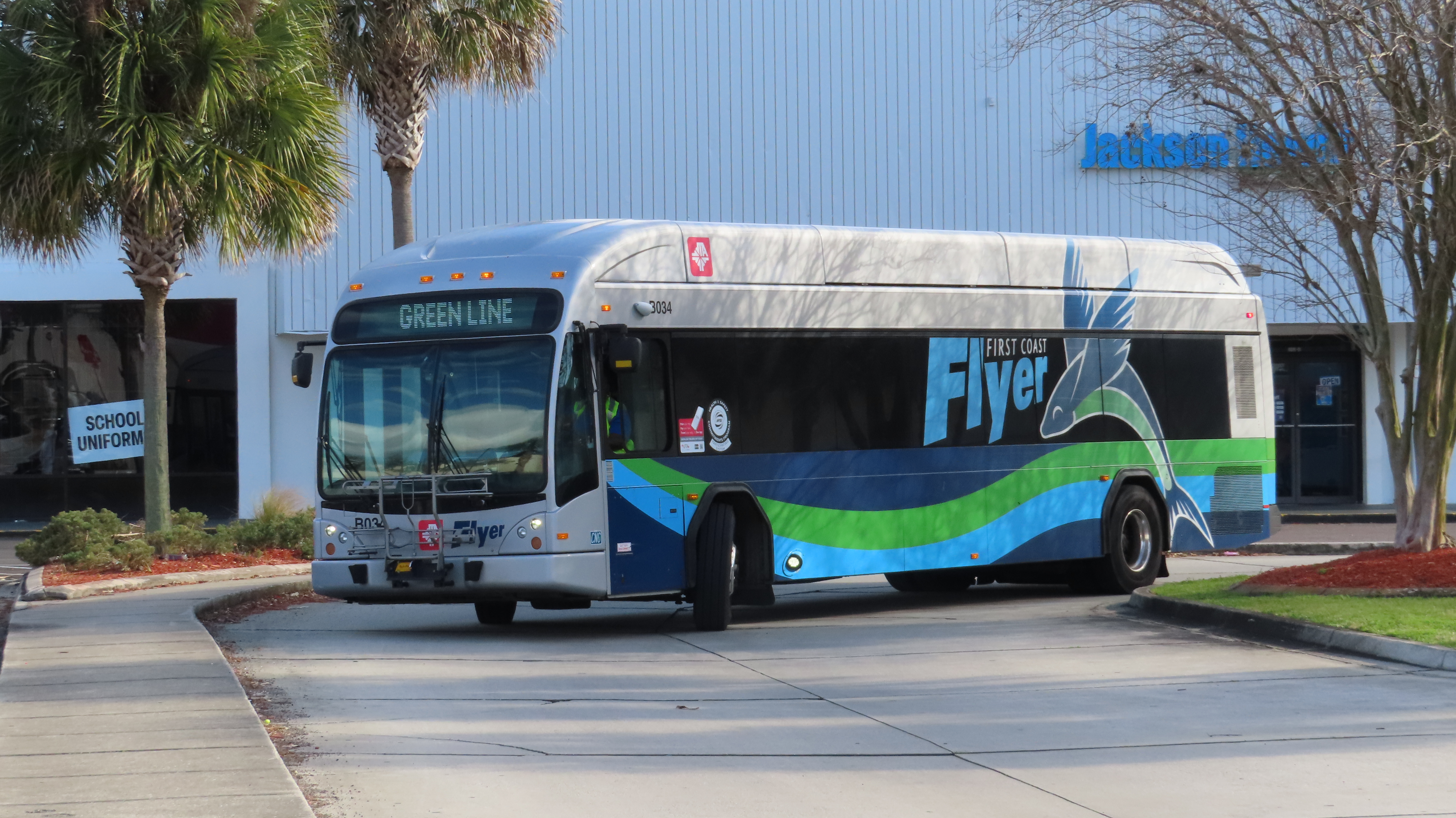
A First Coast Flyer bus at the Gateway Hub in 2026.

On December 1, 2014, JTA underwent a complete system redesign called Route Optimization. This was to provide more frequent, more direct, and more reliable service. The current routes as of 2025 follows. However on November 2, 2026, due to a projected $39 million budget deficit in FY2027, five fixed bus route would be eliminated.

=== Local bus routes ===
- 1 North Main
- 3 Moncrief / Dunn Ave
- 4 Kings Road
- 8 Beach Blvd / Town Center
- 10 Atlantic
- 11 A. Philip Randolph
- 12 Myrtle / Lem Turner
- 13 Commonwealth / Lane
- 14 Edison / Normandy
- 16 Riverside / Wilson
- 17 St. Augustine / San Jose
- 19 Arlington
- 21 Boulevard / Gateway
- 22 Avenue B
- 23 Townsend
- 24 Mayport
- 27 Philips Hwy / Avenues
- 28 Southside / Sunbeam
- 30 Cecil / Blanding (renamed from 30 Cecil on December 5, 2016; sections replaced by ReadiRide Southwest on December 3, 2018)
- 31 Park/Blanding
- 34 Southside
- 50 University
- 51 Edgewood
- 53 Commonwealth / Cassat
- 80 NAS Shuttle
- 81 Dinsmore Shuttle
- 202 Mayport Express

=== First Coast Flyer ===
- 102 First Coast Flyer Green
- 105 First Coast Flyer Orange
- 107 First Coast Flyer Blue
- 109 First Coast Flyer Red

=== Express routes ===
- Clay Express Select
- Nassau Express Select
- St Johns Express Select

=== Ferry routes ===
- St. Johns River Ferry

== First Coast Commuter Rail ==
First Coast Commuter Rail

Overview
- Status: Alternative Study Stage
- Locale: North Florida
- Termini: Central: Downtown Jacksonville, FL; North: Yulee, FL Southwest: Green Cove Springs, FL Southeast: St Augustine, FL
- Website: https://gis.jtafla.com/portal/apps/MapJournal/index.html?appid=9813461a3590462892bcd0cc13d26161

Service
- Type: Commuter rail

Technical
- Line length: 91 mi (146 km)
- Character: At-grade
- Track gauge: 4 ft 8 1/2 in (1,435 mm)

First Coast Commuter Rail is a proposed commuter rail system serving Jacksonville and northeast Florida. It is currently in the planning stages, having completed the first step of a feasibility study and currently pursuing an alternatives analysis.

A feasibility study was completed in November 2009 for the Jacksonville Transportation Authority (JTA). James Boyle, JTA's regional transportation planner, has since said that there are no fatal flaws in the study.

JTA hired a consultant to conduct a feasibility study in early 2008 at the cost of $400,000. It was completed in November 2009. The study looked into 7 routes, most along existing freight rail right of ways. Three of these, north to Yulee, Florida, southwest to Green Cove Springs, Florida and the southeast to St. Augustine, Florida, were selected for in depth study. In 2010, JTA allocated $1 million for an Alternative Analysis study on the proposed system. This is a required step to participate in the Federal Transit Administration's New Starts program.

In May 2013, St. Augustine City Commission voted in a resolution supporting the proposal of a commuter train service on the southeast corridor. JTA said that the federal government could fund half of the southeast corridor project, estimated to cost about $193.3 million. The proposal still needs approval from St. Johns County, The North Florida Transportation Planning Organization board, and the Jacksonville Transportation Authority board.

As of 2023, First Coast Commuter Rail is still in the planning stages and no funding has been identified for its implementation.

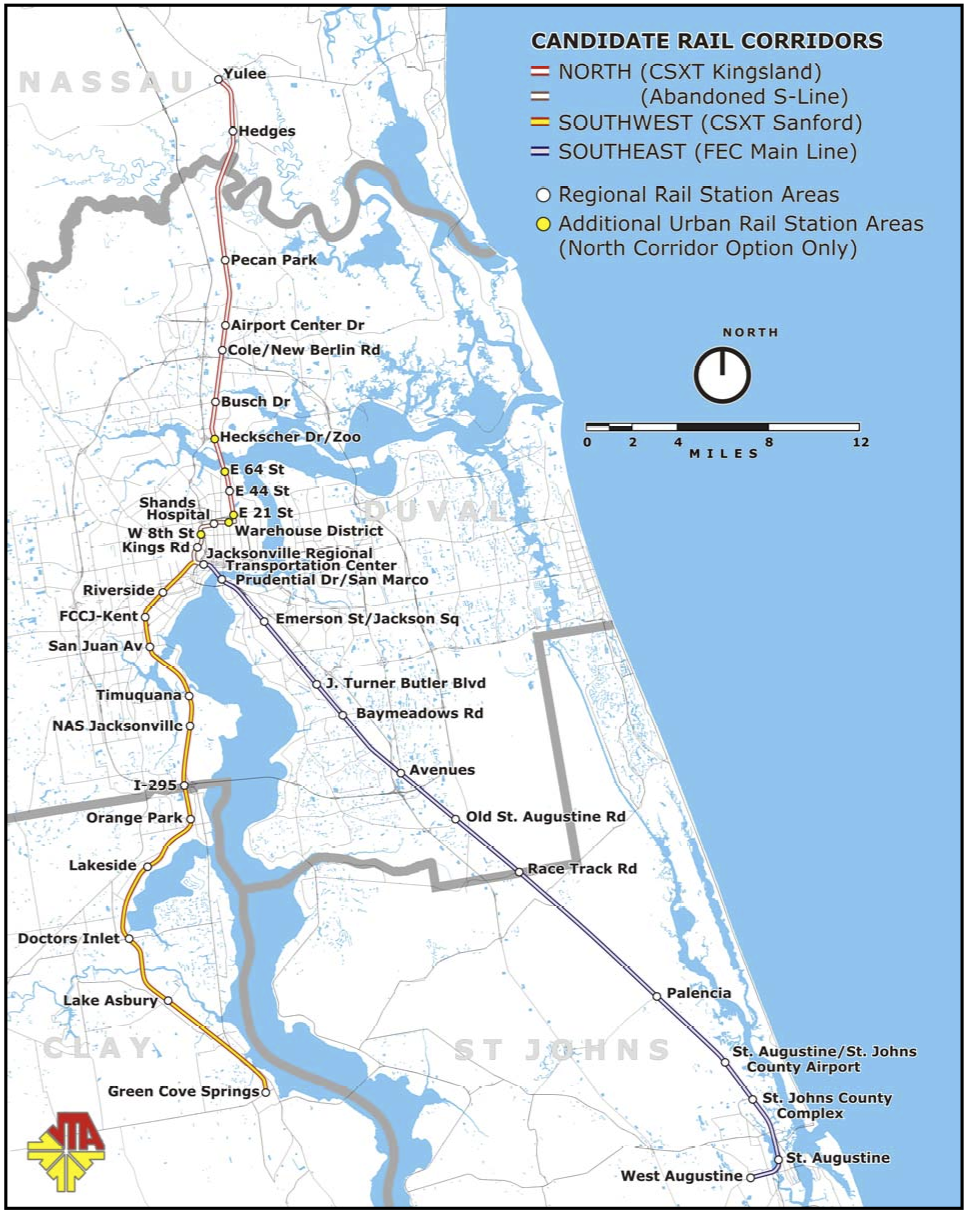
Map of planned system

All routes in the in-depth study start in downtown Jacksonville and head out in one of three directions: North (to Yulee), South (to Green Cove Springs), and Southeast (to St. Augustine).

The North Corridor originates in Downtown Jacksonville, and heads North along the abandoned S-Line to the CSX Kingsland division line to Yulee. The Kingsland division line is a remnant of the Seaboard Air Line's mainline. The route passes two miles (3 km) from Jacksonville International Airport.

The Southwest Corridor originates in Downtown Jacksonville, and heads South along the CSX A-Line to Green Cove Springs.

The Southeast Corridor originates in Downtown Jacksonville, and heads Southeast along the Florida East Coast Railway's main line to St. Augustine, closely following U.S. 1, known as Philips Highway in Jacksonville and Ponce de Leon Boulevard in St. Augustine . The proposed 38.4-mile (61.8 km) route would share the railbed with the northernmost part of a 368-mile (592 km) freight rail line to Miami. The heavily trafficked corridor already serves 17 regularly scheduled interregional freight trains per day, a figure which does not include Amtrak service, unscheduled freight trains, and other services. The 2009 feasibility study estimated that this route could carry an estimated 5,469 passengers in 2020 on trains between Jacksonville and St. Augustine. Travel time is estimated at 51 minutes end to end, comparable to travel time by car. Notable proposed stops along the route include J. Turner Butler Freeway, The Avenues, Race Track Road/Nocatee, the massive mixed-use residential/commercial development at Palencia, West St. Augustine, Northeast Florida Regional Airport, St. Johns County Government Complex, and its terminus in Downtown St. Augustine.

By 2023, planning for the Southeast Corridor had progressed to the planning phase with a potential of four stations along the route: the Jacksonville Regional Transportation Center at LaVilla, Avenues Walk, Racetrack Road, and St. Augustine.

== Governance ==
The JTA is governed by a seven-member Board of Directors. The mayor of Jacksonville appoints three members who must be confirmed by the Jacksonville City Council; the Florida Governor appoints three members who must be confirmed by the Florida Senate. Each member serves a four-year, unpaid term and can be re-appointed for a second term. If a member serves eight consecutive years, they must rotate off the board. From its membership, the Board elects its own Chairman, Vice Chairman, Secretary and Treasurer for one year terms. The seventh member is the District Two Secretary from the Florida Department of Transportation (FDOT) who serves as long as s/he is employed in the position. That individual is responsible for the FDOT activities within the 18 counties of the district, including administrative, planning and operations.

As of September 2022, members included Ari Jolly, chair; Debbie Buckland, vice chair; G. Ray Driver, secretary; Abel Harding, treasurer; Greg Evans, FDOT District Two Secretary; Kevin Holzendorf, board member; and Aundra Wallace, board member.

== Revenue ==
Originally, when a bridge or roadway was completed, a toll was imposed at that location to create a revenue stream to repay bonds used to fund construction. State and federal tax money was used for specific capital projects, such as interstate highways.

=== Gas surcharge ===
The Jacksonville City Council approved a 10-year, 6¢ per gallon gasoline surcharge in 1986 to pay for new roadways and other transportation projects. Prior to its expiration in 1996, the council extended the tax for 20 additional years, until 2016. In 2021, the City Council approved a further extension and increase to 12¢ per gallon in order to pay for infrastructure projects including the Emerald Trail system and the Ultimate Urban Circulator project to convert the Skyway monorail into an autonomous vehicle network.

=== Tolls ===
J. Turner Butler Boulevard, the Fuller Warren Bridge, Mathews Bridge, Hart Bridge, and Trout River Bridge were tolled by JTA until 1988, when Jacksonville voters approved a ½¢ sales tax increase to pay off the toll bonds, fund future road construction, and abolish toll collections.

=== Growth management ===
JTA was the major beneficiary of the $2.25 billion Better Jacksonville Plan (BJP), passed by voters in September, 2000. Roadway/drainage improvements, resurfacing, new sidewalks and railroad grade crossings accounted for $1.5 billion, of which half was funded by the BJP ½¢ sales tax increase and half from the existing gasoline surcharge. In 2005, the JTA and city re-prioritized the projects still outstanding. The actual cost for most projects had significantly exceeded the estimate due to an 18-month lag time and an unanticipated increase in the price of construction materials. Dozens of projects were deferred to the future and removed from the BJP or left on a $320 million list of unfunded tasks.

=== Budget ===
The gasoline surcharge generates approximately $30 million in revenue each year, about one third of JTA's budget of $100 million in 2010. Prior to the 1986 gasoline surcharge, tolls were the primary source of local revenue for the JTA. Federal and state highway money provided the balance. In early June, 2010, JTA announced their intentions to request an extension of the 6¢ per gallon gasoline surcharge, due to expire in 2016. They will also ask the council for an additional 5¢ per gallon tax over 30 years that would generate another $25 million per year, for a total of $55 million each year. Most council members questioned the need to extend the existing tax and were opposed to any new tax during difficult economic times, but JTA executives warned that if the gas taxes are curtailed, no road construction will occur and bus service will be slashed.

On January 7, 2026, the Jacksonville Transportation Authority had an $18 million dollar deficit during fiscal year 2025, due to lower than expected ridership numbers on NAVI. Later, on May 29, the agency announced service cuts that will discontinue five bus routes and five ReadiRide zones, and raise fares up to $2.00, in order to make up for a projected $17.5 million budget deficit in fiscal year 2027.
