= San Marco station =

Jacksonville Skyway station in Florida, US

San Marco
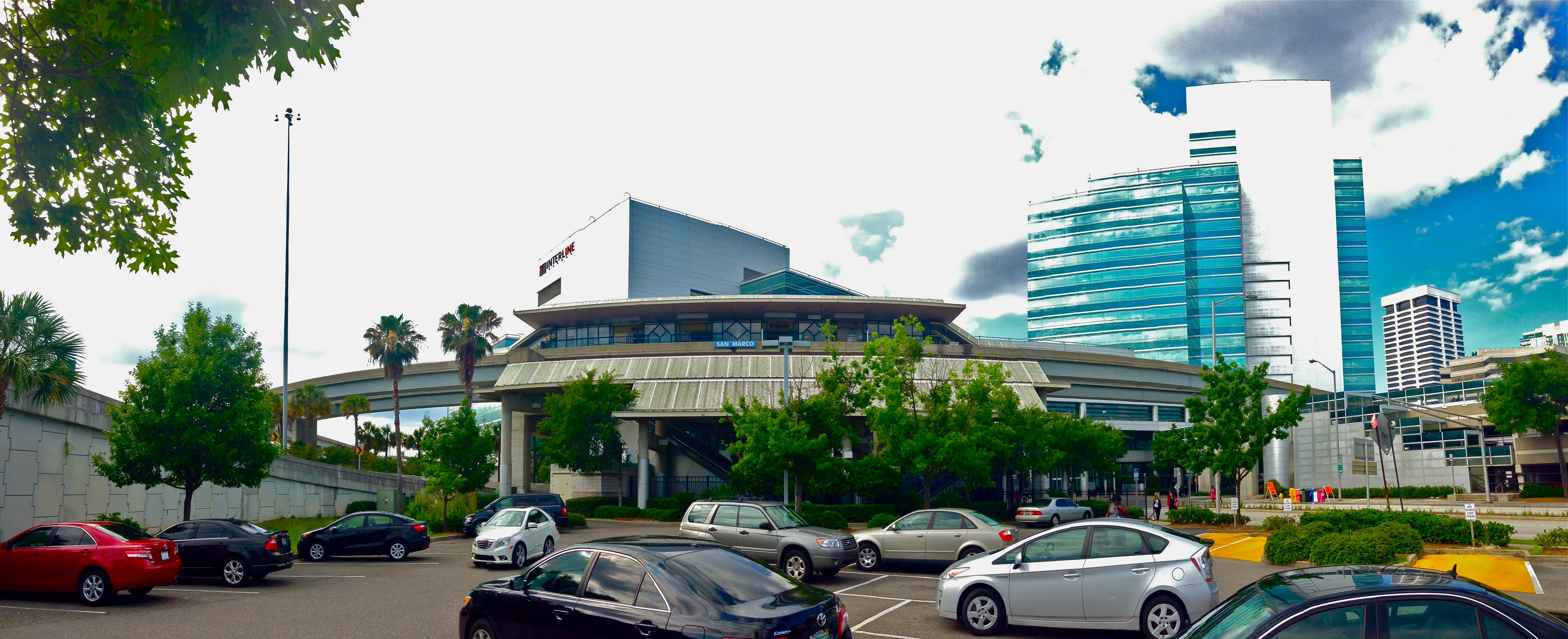
- San Marco station from the South

General information
- Location: 701 San Marco Boulevard South; Jacksonville, Florida
- Coordinates: 30°19′03.5″N 81°39′39″W
- Owner: Jacksonville Transportation Authority
- Platforms: 1 island platform
- Tracks: 2
- Connections: Jacksonville Water Taxi

Construction
- Structure type: Elevated
- Accessible: Yes

History
- Opened: October 30, 1998

Services
Preceding station	Jacksonville Transportation Authority	Following station
Riverplace toward Kings Avenue	Skyway	Central Terminus
Location

San Marco station is a Skyway monorail station in Jacksonville, Florida. It is located at the corner of San Marco Boulevard and Mary Street in the Southbank area of Downtown Jacksonville. Nearby points of interest include the Museum of Science and History and Friendship Fountain Park.

== History ==
The station at San Marco Boulevard is the first on the Jacksonville Skyway's Southbank extension. It opened on October 30, 1998, and was the southern terminus on the line until the Riverplace and Kings Avenue stations opened two years later. San Marco Station is the first stop reached as the line crosses the St. Johns River over the Acosta Bridge from Central Station. As it stands at the southern approach of the Acosta Bridge, it has an unusual configuration; with its three-story interior concourse it is the highest of all the Skyway stations.

The next stations in the line are Central station to the north and Riverplace station to the east. Points of interest nearby include Friendship Fountain, the Museum of Science and History, and the Southbank Riverwalk.
