= Education in Jacksonville, Florida =

Education in Jacksonville, Florida is available through both public and private sources.

== Primary and secondary education ==
Public schools in Jacksonville are controlled by the Duval County School Board (DCSB), which had a 2009-10 enrollment of over 155,000 students, making it the 15th largest school district in the United States, and 5th largest school district in Florida. DCPS has 160 regular-attendance schools as of the 2009-10 school year: 105 elementary schools, 28 middle schools and 20 high schools. The district also has an adult education system, with night classes at most high schools, three dedicated ESE schools, as well as a hospital/homebound program and four alternative education centers.

The total does not include charter schools, which numbered 13 for the 2009-2010 school year. Charter schools operate under contract to the Duval County School Board and follow the curriculum and rules of the DCSB. They are publicly funded and non-sectarian; most are oriented to help students "at risk". These include students who have been unsuccessful in a traditional setting; have below average grades; have difficulty on tests; have been retained in one or more grade levels; or have problems with behavior.

=== Best schools ===
Seven of Jacksonville's high schools appeared in Newsweek magazine's annual list of the country's top public high schools. Two of these, Stanton College Preparatory School and Paxon School for Advanced Studies, regularly appear at the top of the list; they were ranked at #3 and #8 in the 2010 edition. The 2010 edition of the list further included Douglas Anderson School of the Arts (#33), Mandarin High School (#97), Fletcher High School (#205) Sandalwood High School (#210), and Englewood High School (#1146).

Jacksonville, along with the standard district schools, is home to four International Baccalaureate Diploma Programme ("IB") high schools. They are Stanton, Paxon, Samuel Wolfson, and Jean Ribault High School. Jacksonville also has a notable high school devoted to the performing and expressive arts, Douglas Anderson School of the Arts. The Advanced International Certificate of Education (AICE) program is available at Duncan U. Fletcher High School, Mandarin High School and William M. Raines High School.

=== Magnet schools ===
A total of 71 schools offer magnet programs in 30 program areas. In addition to the required courses, these schools allow students to explore individual interests and develop talents in the arts, aviation, culinary skills, language, law & legal occupations, mathematics, public service, science and technology. Nearly 20,000 students participated during the 2009-2010 school year.

=== Private schools ===
The Roman Catholic Diocese of St. Augustine operates a number of Catholic schools in Jacksonville, including two high schools, Bishop Kenny High School and Bishop John J. Snyder High School. Other private schools in Jacksonville include Arlington Country Day School, the Bolles School, Episcopal School of Jacksonville, Providence School, and University Christian School.

== Libraries ==
The Jacksonville Public Library had its beginnings when May Moore and Florence Murphy started the "Jacksonville Library and Literary Association" in 1878. The Association was populated by various prominent Jacksonville residents and sought to create a free public library and reading room for the city.

Over the course of 127 years, the system has grown from that one room library to become one of the largest in the state. The Jacksonville library system has twenty branches, ranging in size from the 54,000 sq ft (5,000 m^{2}) West Regional Library to smaller neighborhood libraries like Westbrook and Eastside. The Library annually receives nearly 4 million visitors and circulates over 6 million items. Nearly 500,000 library cards are held by area residents.

On November 12, 2005, the new 300,000 sq ft (30,000 m^{2}) Main Library opened to the public, replacing the 40-year-old Haydon Burns Library. The largest public library in the state, the opening of the new main library marked the completion of an unprecedented period of growth for the system under the Better Jacksonville Plan. The new Main Library offers specialized reading rooms, public access to hundreds of computers and public displays of art, an extensive collection of books, and special collections ranging from the African-American Collection to the recently opened Holocaust Collection.

== Higher education ==
Jacksonville is home to several institutions of higher learning. There are two public institutions. University of North Florida (UNF), founded in 1969, is a member of the State University System of Florida. It has over 16,000 students and offers a variety of bachelor's, master's, and doctoral programs. Florida State College at Jacksonville is a public state college in the Florida College System. It has over 80,000 enrolled full- and part-time students and offers two-year associate's degrees as well as some four-year bachelor's programs. Additionally, St. Johns River State College is a state college in the wider area with campuses in St. Augustine, Orange Park, and Palatka.

There are a number of private colleges and universities as well. Jacksonville University, established in 1934, is a private, four-year institution. It enrolls around 3,500 students a year and offers a number of bachelor's and master's programs. Edward Waters College, founded in 1866, is Jacksonville's oldest institution of higher education, as well as the Florida's oldest historically black college. It enrolls around 800 students and offers associate's and bachelor's programs. Also in the area is Flagler College, a private college in St. Augustine.

There are a number of specialty and for-profit schools in the area. These include Jones College, founded in 1918, which enrolls 630 students and offers associate's & bachelor's programs. Florida Coastal School of Law, founded in 1996, is the city's only law school; it enrolls 1,400 students, and offers Juris Doctorates and specialized law certificates. The Art Institute of Jacksonville is one of The Art Institutes, a for-profit chain of art schools. A number of other for-profit schools have campuses in Jacksonville.

A 2010 survey by The Florida Times-Union found that most employers view education from for-profit schools acceptable for entry-level jobs, but in a situation where two equally qualified individuals applied for a job, the person with a degree from the public university would be hired. Another consideration was accreditation; most institutions have at least national accreditation, but some individual medical or technical programs require additional accreditation. Another question was whether course credits would transfer to other institutions; most institutions do not accept credits from nationally accredited schools.

== Museums ==
There are twenty museums in Jacksonville that feature diverse subjects. The Cummer Museum of Art and Gardens holds a large collection of European and American paintings and a collection of early Meissen porcelain. The museum is surrounded by three acres of formal English and Italian style gardens. The Jacksonville Fire Museum is located in the Catherine Street Fire Station, which is on the National Register of Historic Places. Their displays feature 500+ firefighting artifacts including an 1806 hand pumper. The Jacksonville Maritime Museum collection includes models of ships, paintings, photographs and artifacts dating to 1562; the Museum of Contemporary Art Jacksonville focuses on art produced after the modernist period; the Museum of Science & History features a main exhibit that changes quarterly, plus three floors of nature and local history exhibits, a hands-on science area and astronomy at the Alexander Brest Planetarium; the LaVilla Museum opened in 1999 and showcases a permanent display of African-American history. The Karpeles Manuscript Library is the world's largest private collection of original manuscripts & documents. The museum in Jacksonville is in a 1921 neoclassical building on the outskirts of downtown. In addition to document displays, there is also an antique-book library, with volumes dating from the late 1800s. The Alexander Brest Museum and Gallery on the campus of Jacksonville University exhibits a diverse collection of carved ivory, Pre-Columbian artifacts, Steuben glass, Chinese porcelain and Cloisonné, Tiffany glass, Boehm porcelain and rotating exhibitions containing the work of local, regional, national and international artists.
