= Southbank (Jacksonville) =

Neighborhood of Jacksonville, Florida

- Neighborhood of Jacksonville
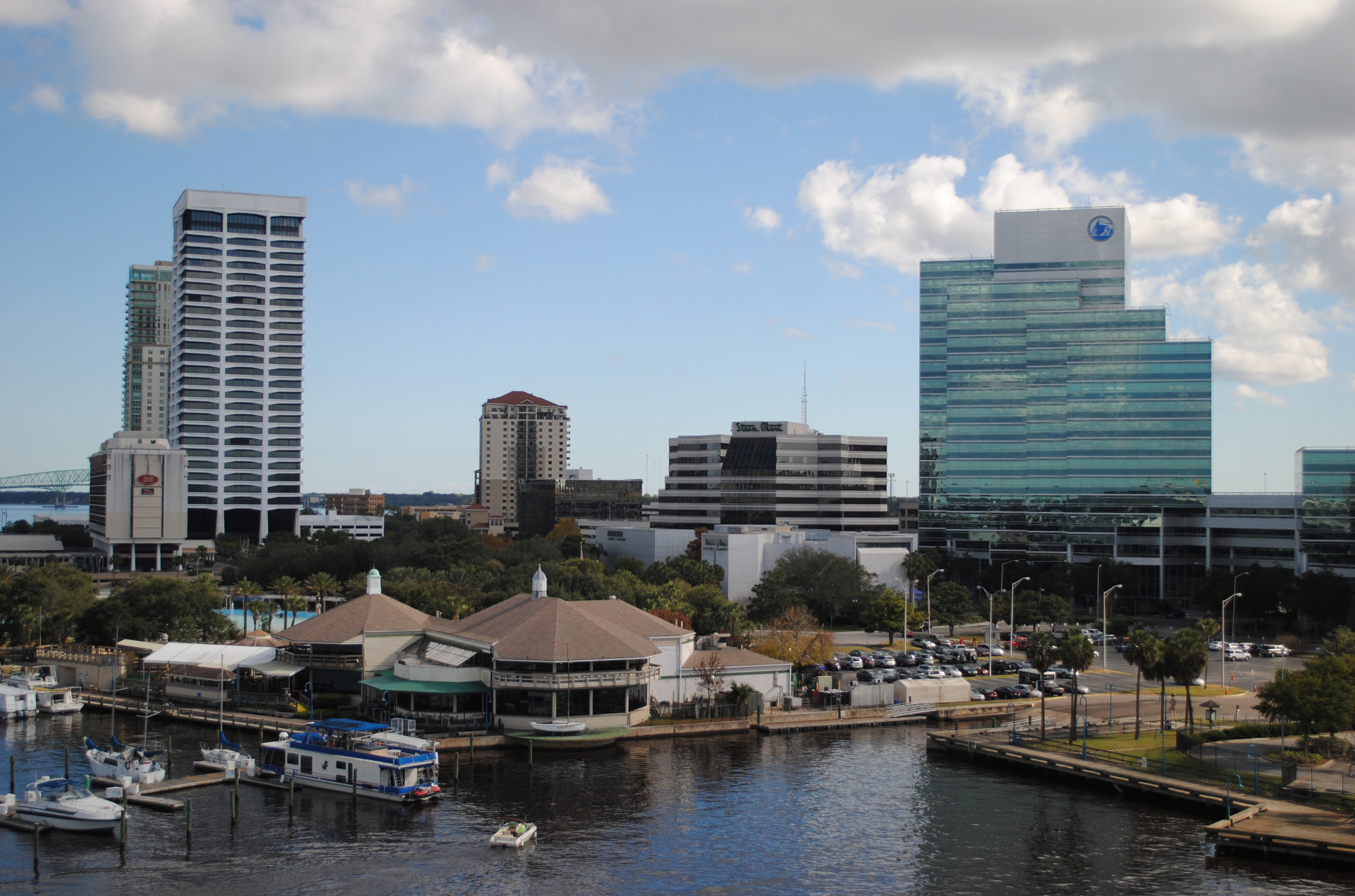
- View of Riverplace Tower and the Southbank from the Acosta Bridge

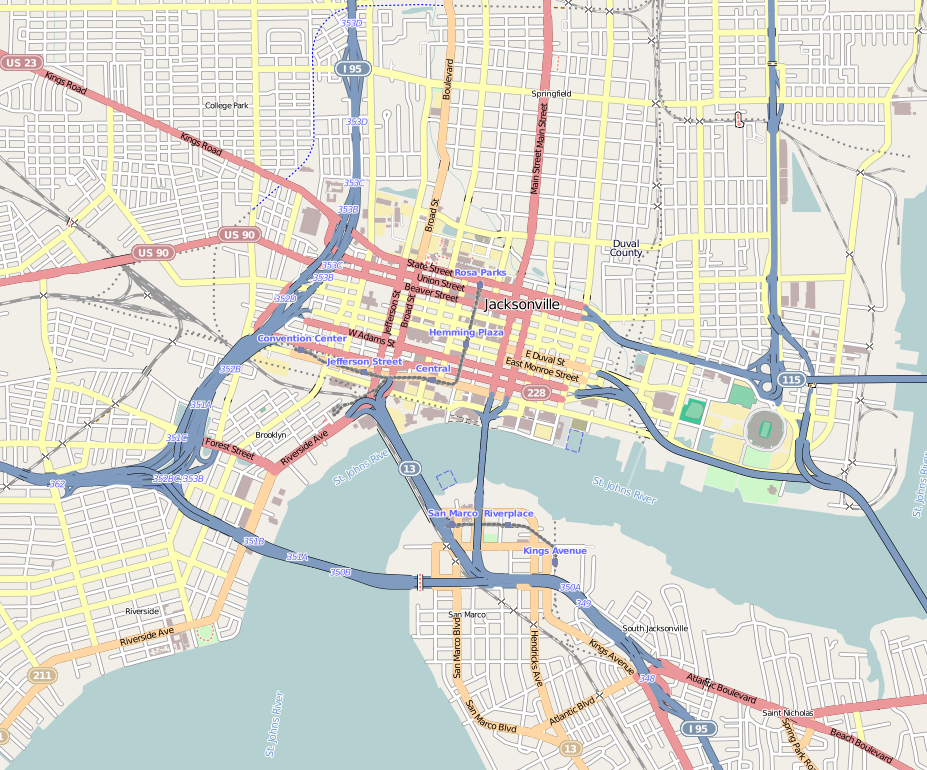
- Location within Central Jacksonville
- Coordinates: 30.317742°N 81.656589°W

Government
  - City Council: ?
  - State Assembly: Reggie Fullwood
  - State Senate: Audrey Gibson
  - U.S. House: John Rutherford (R)

Area
  - Total: 1.33 km^{2} (0.515 sq mi)
  - Land: 1.33 km^{2} (0.515 sq mi)
- ZIP Code: 32207
- Area code: 904

The Southbank is a neighborhood of Jacksonville, Florida, considered part of the Urban Core.

== Location ==
Southbank is located along the St. Johns River, south of the Downtown Core, and immediately north of San Marco. It is roughly bounded by the river to the north and west, Bishop Kenny High School to the east, and Interstate 95 to the south.

== Transportation ==
Southbank is served by the Jacksonville Transportation Authority's Skyway, an extensive bus network and the Jacksonville Water Taxi.

Current Skyway Stations in Southbank

- San Marco near the Acosta Bridge on San Marco Blvd. It serves the Museum of Science and History, Baptist Medical Center, and the Prudential Building.
- Riverplace on Flagler Ave services Riverplace Tower.
- Kings Avenue at Kings Ave & Prudential Dr and is the southern terminus of the Skyway

== Attractions and characteristics ==
Southbank is a mixed-used district closely associated with Jacksonville's San Marco neighborhood. It includes large office and residential structures, such as the Aetna Building, The Peninsula, and Riverplace Tower. Attractions such as the Museum of Science and History, Friendship Fountain and the Southbank Riverwalk can also be found in the district. The city hopes to better integrate it with the rest of Downtown as well as San Marco.

== Neighborhood ==
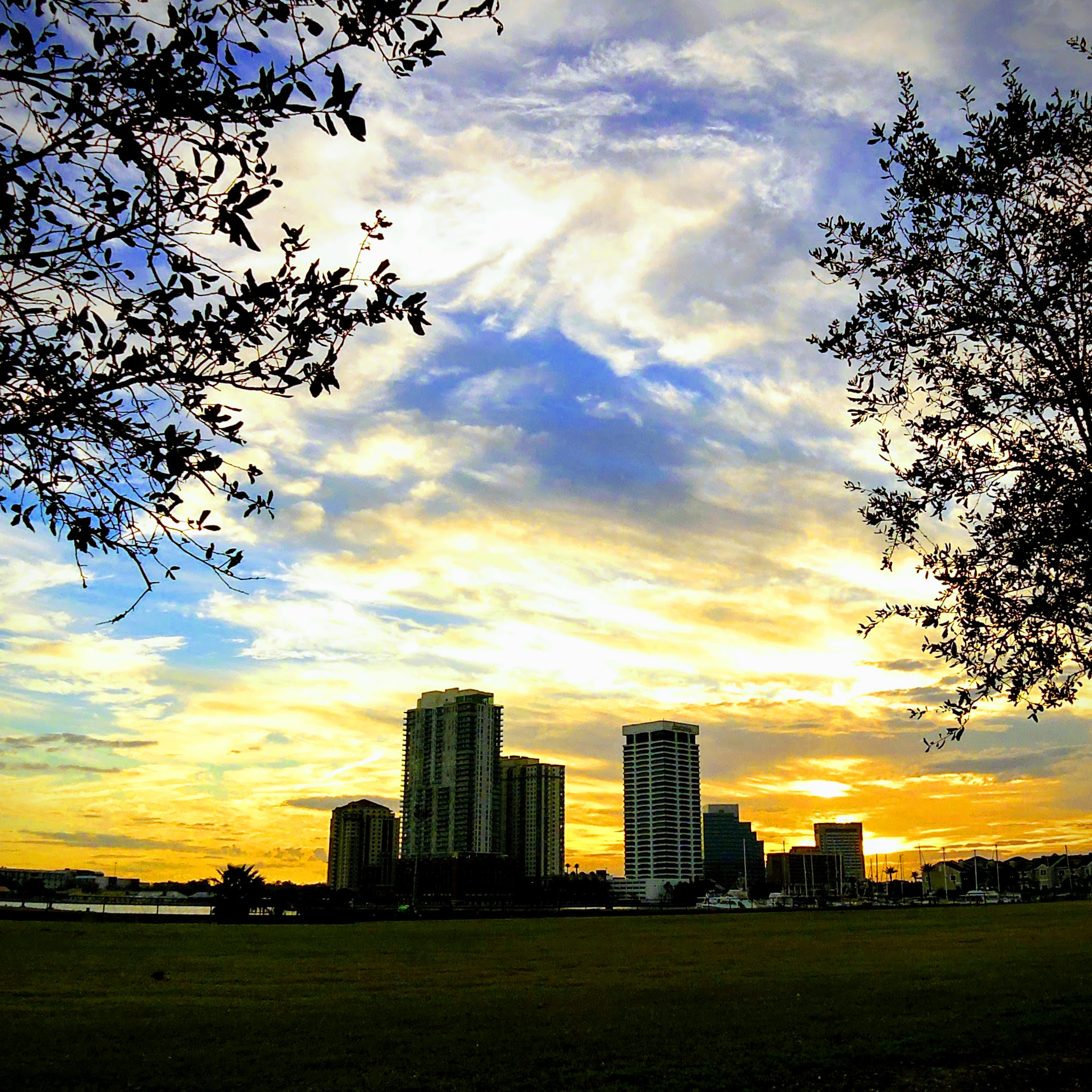
Southbank as seen from the Maxwell House roasting plant.

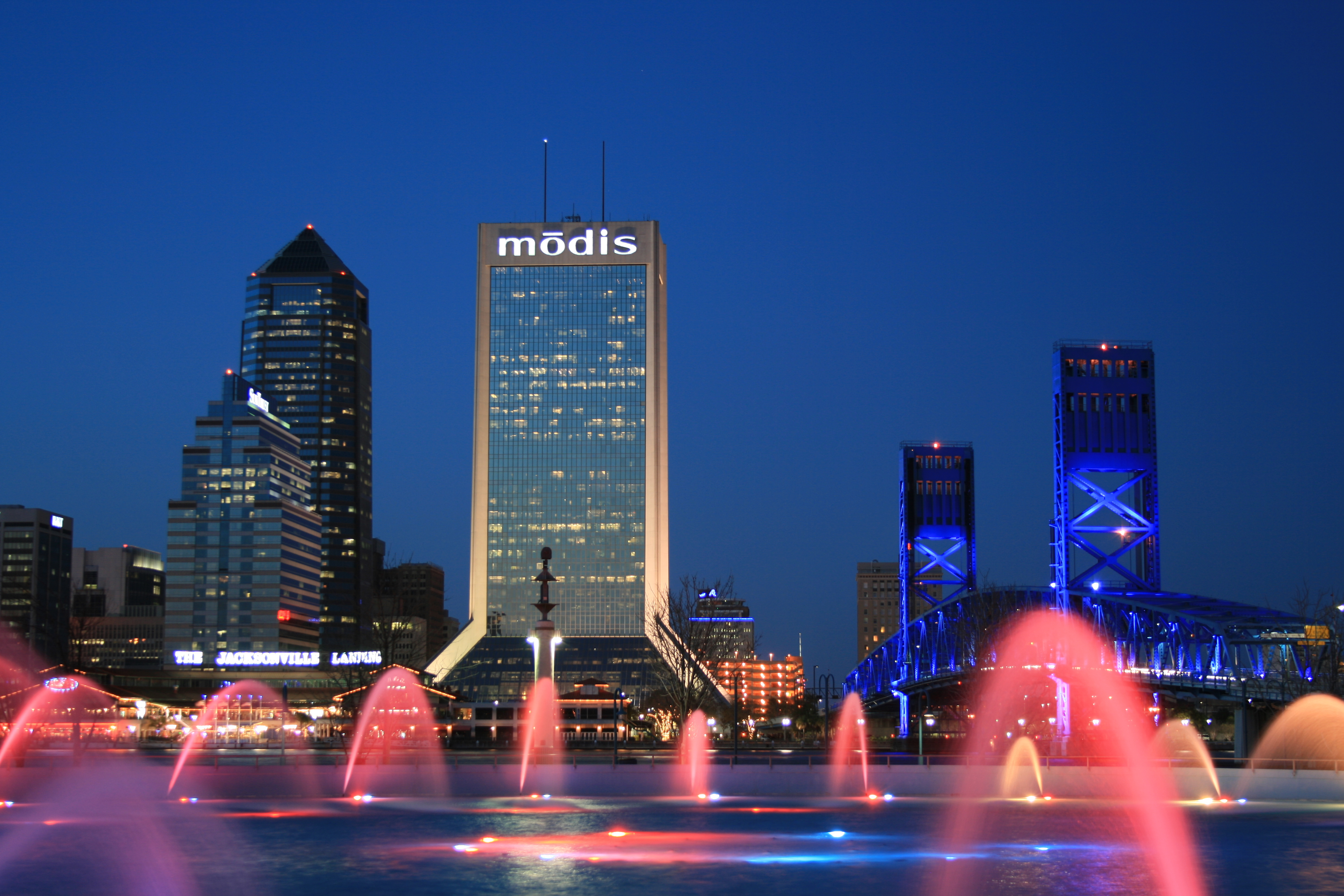
Friendship Fountain

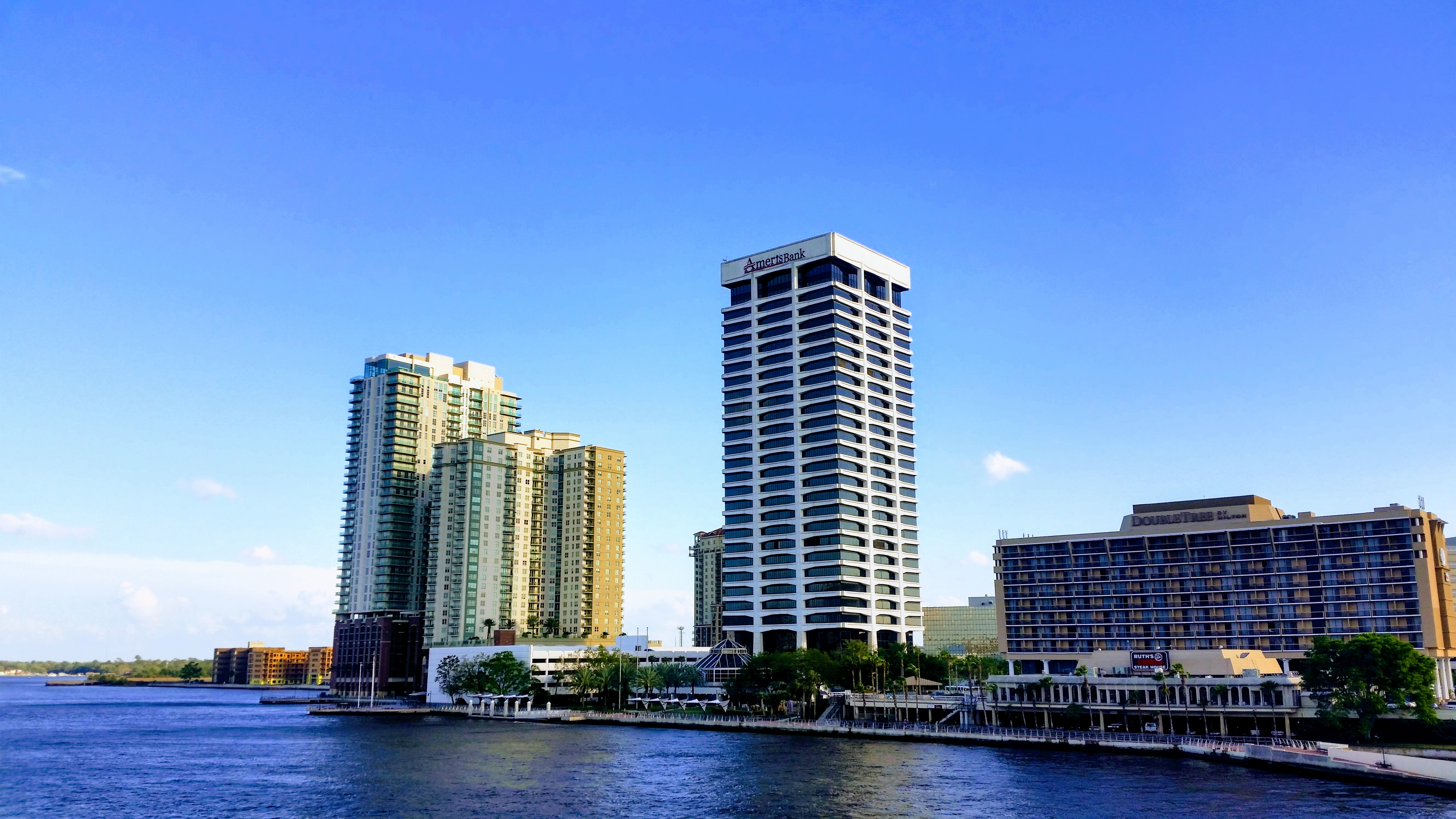
Southbank from Main Street Bridge

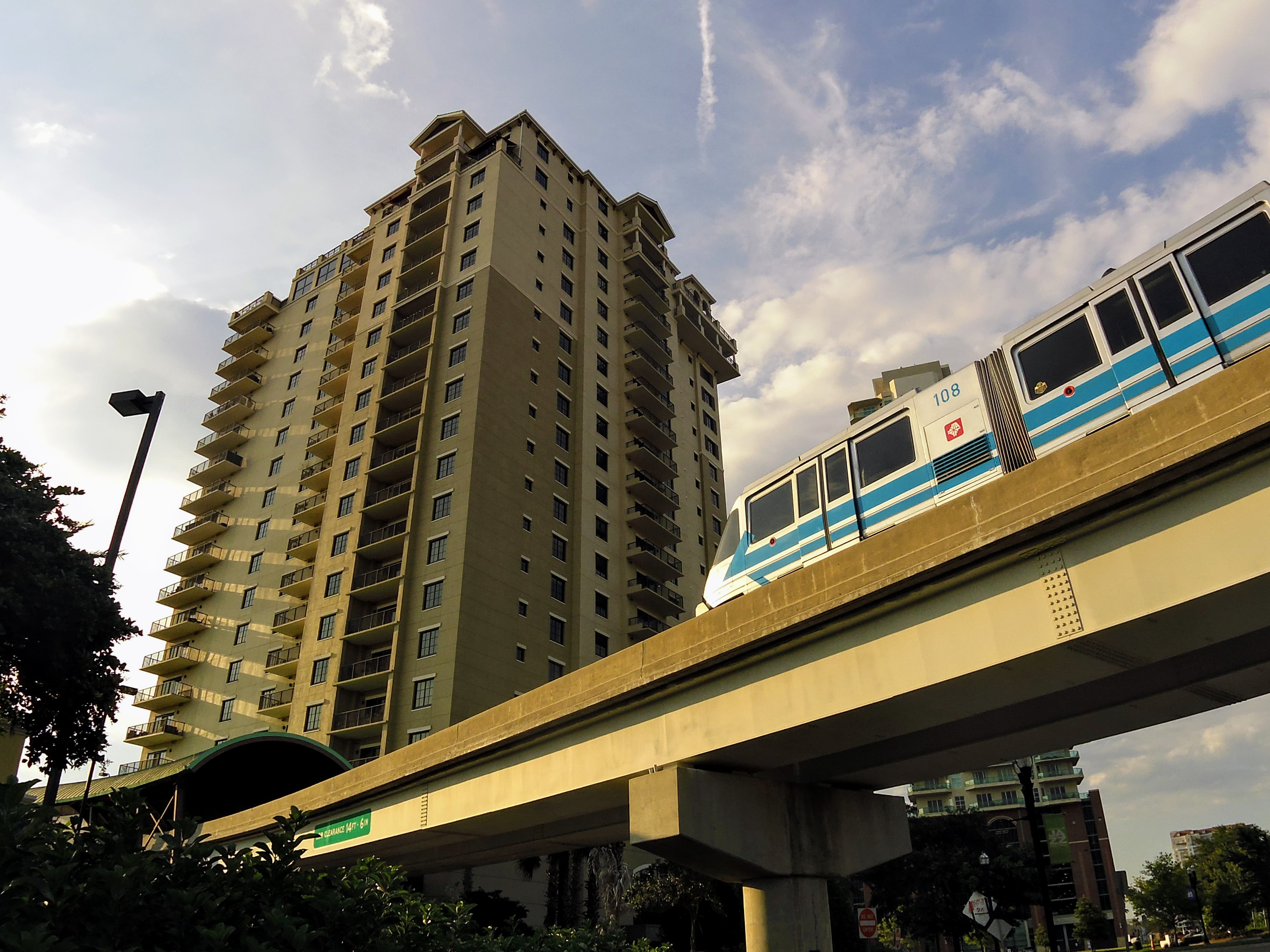
Jacksonville Skyway at San Marco Condos

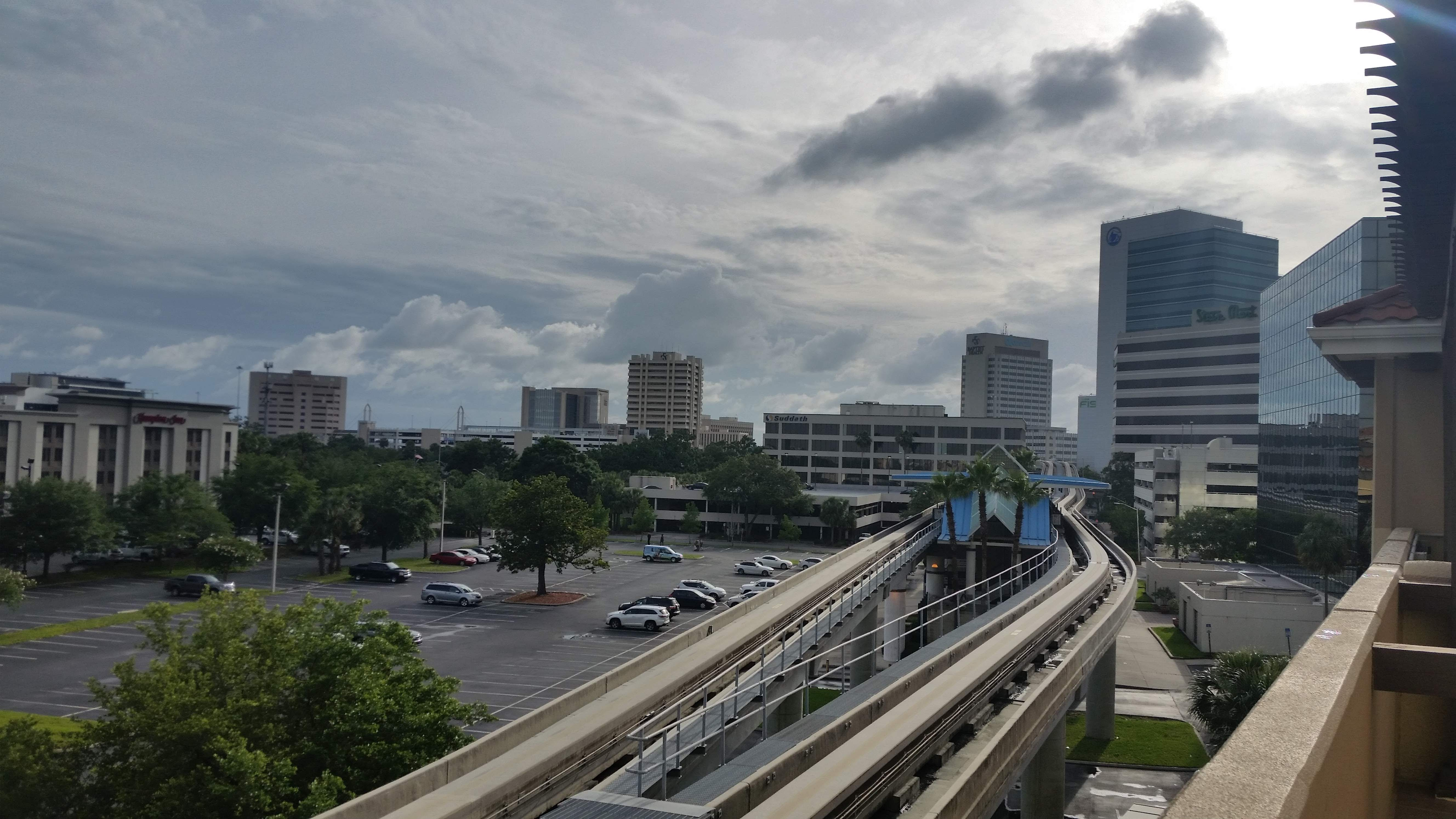
JTA Skyway's Riverplace Station in the heart of the Southbank

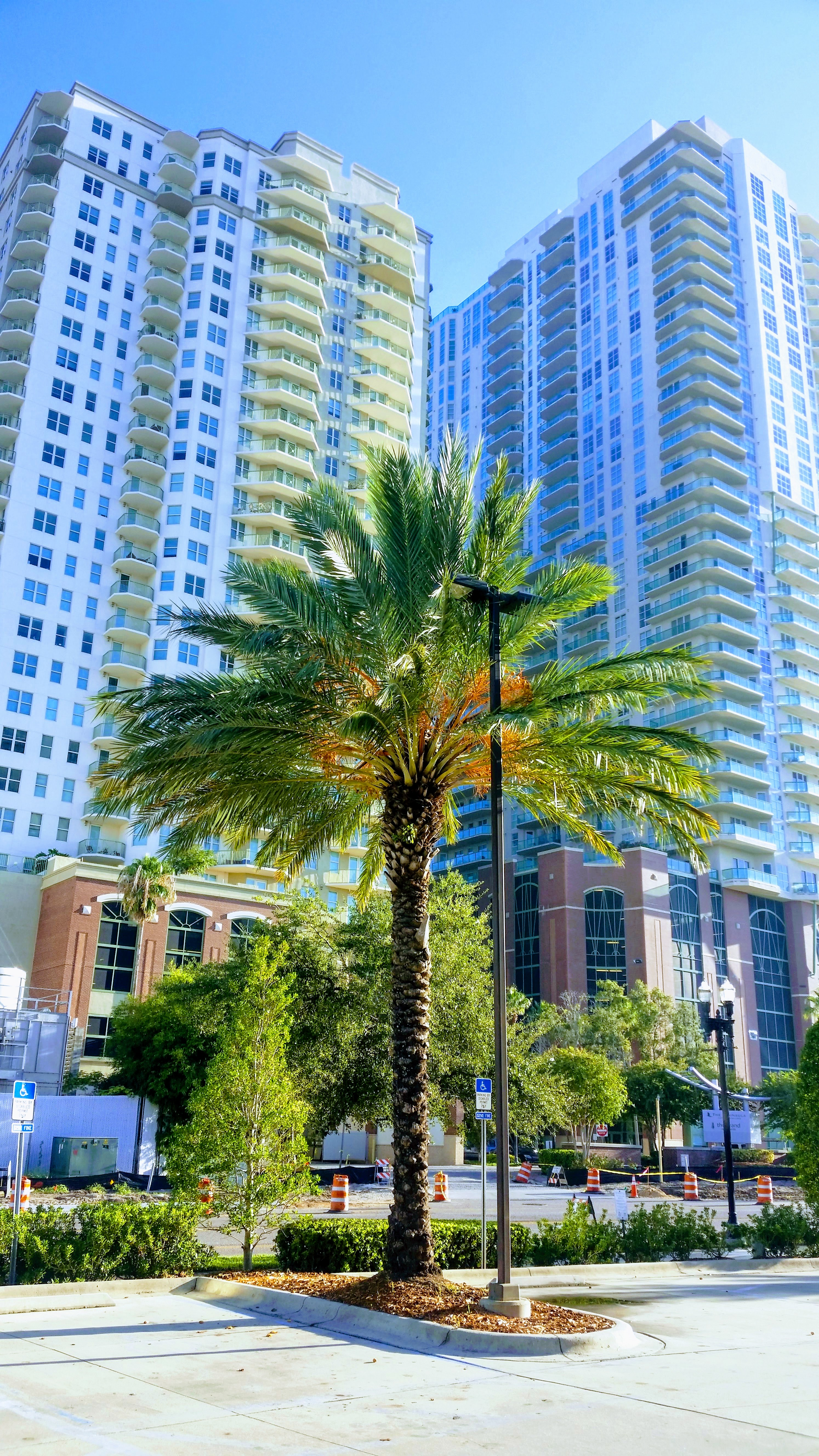
The Strand And The Peninsula high rises

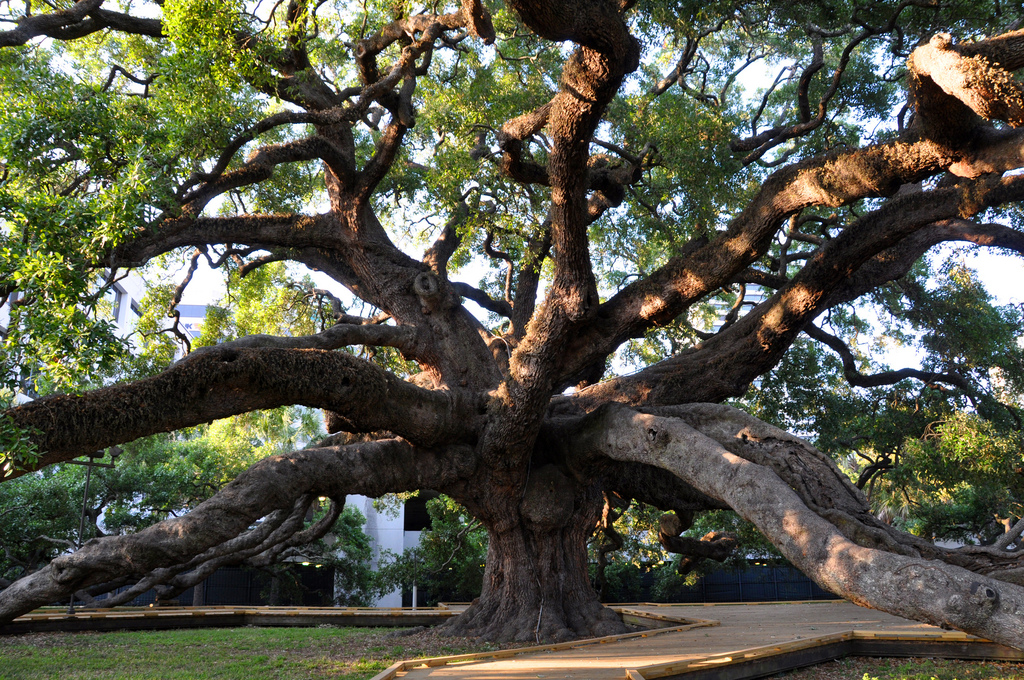
Treaty Oak Park

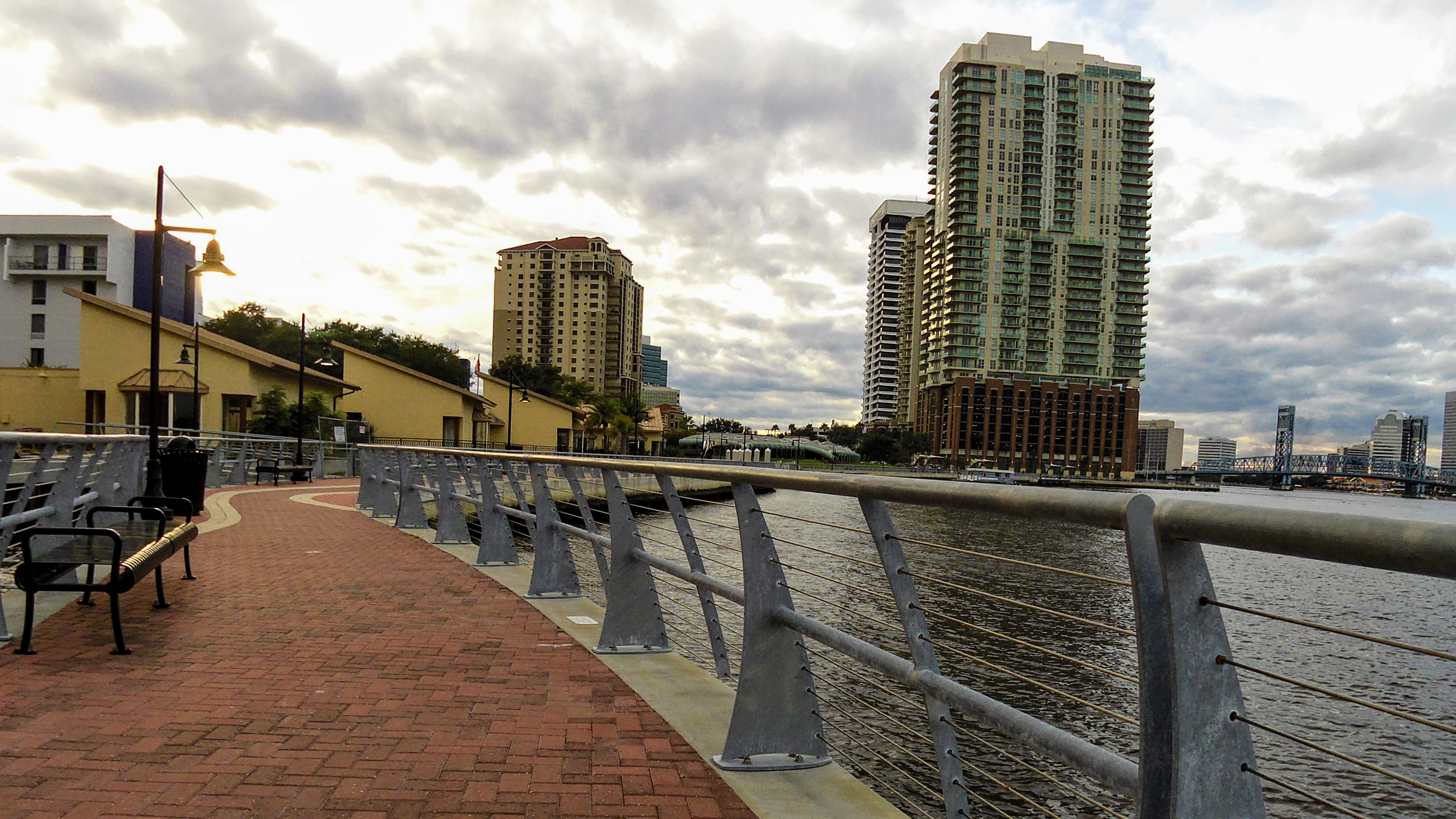
Southbank Riverwalk

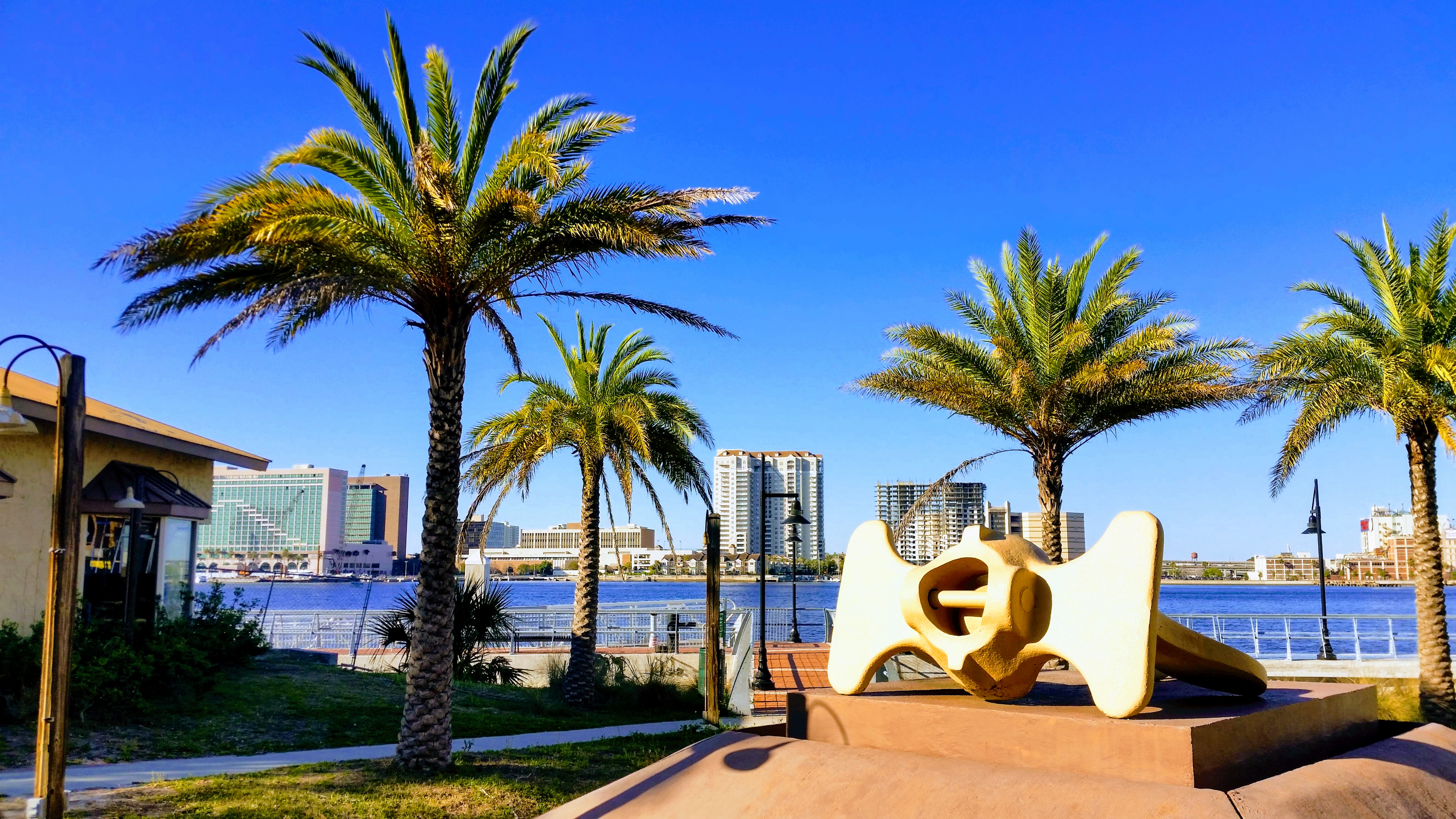
In Memory of All Gallant American Merchant Seamen Who Have Lost Their Lives at Sea. Sponsored by the Women's Propeller Club Port of Jacksonville 1980.
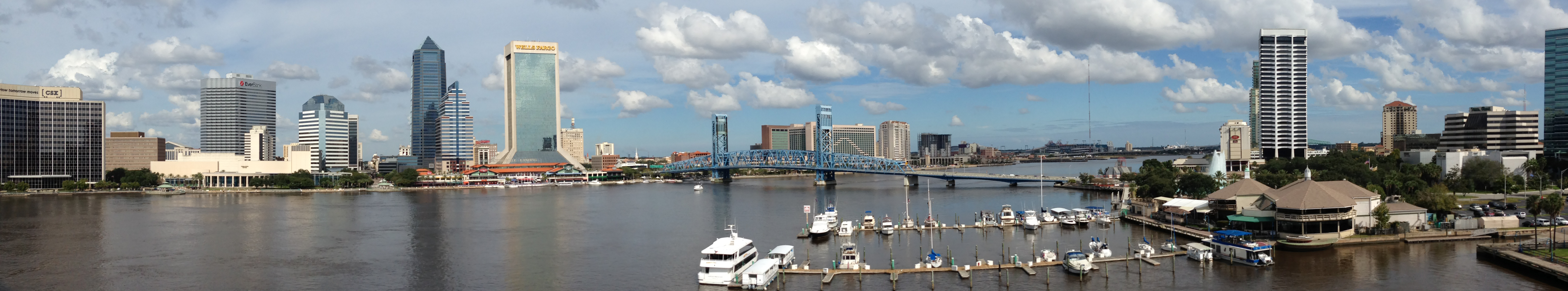
From left to right: Northbank Jacksonville skyline and the Main Street Bridge
