= Riverplace =

Riverplace or River Place may refer to:

- Riverplace Tower, a skyscraper in Jacksonville, Florida, United States
- Riverplace (JTA Skyway), a JTA Skyway station in Jacksonville, Florida
- Riverplace, a housing and office complex across from Saint Anthony Main in Minneapolis, Minnesota
- RiverPlace, a neighborhood located on the waterfront in downtown Portland, Oregon
- River Place, Detroit
