= Neighborhood Autonomous Vehicle Innovation =

Autonomous vehicle service in Jacksonville, Florida, United States

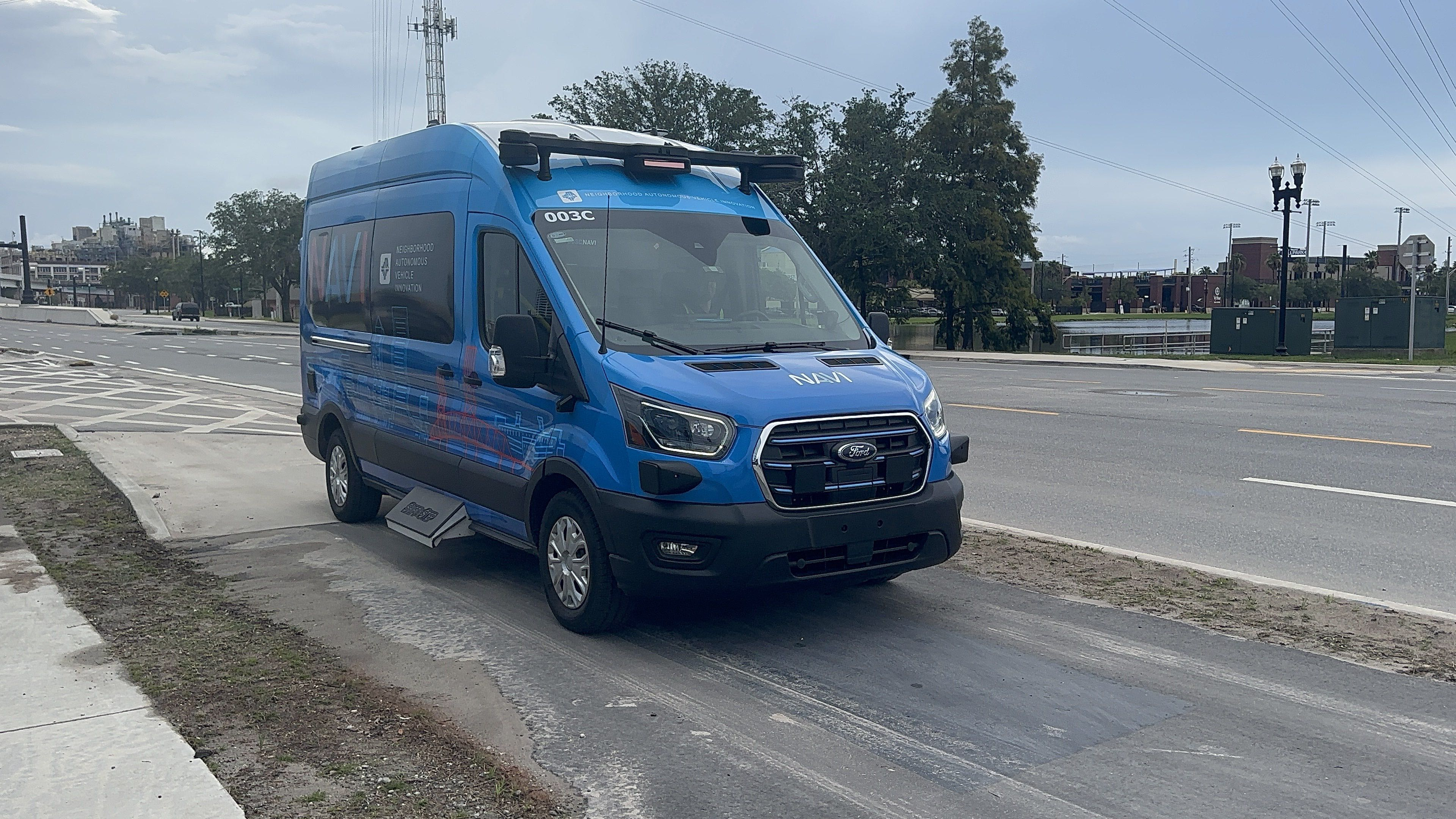
- NAVI shuttle

Overview
- Owner: Jacksonville Transportation Authority
- Locale: Jacksonville, Florida
- Termini: Central station (Jacksonville); EverBank Stadium
- Stations: 12

Service
- Type: Self-driving bus
- Services: 1
- Operator: Beep
- Rolling stock: 14
- Daily ridership: 89 (2025)

History
- Opened: June 30, 2025; 16 months ago
- Closed: December 31, 2026; 57 days' time

Technical
- Line length: 3.5 miles (5.6 km)
- Num of tracks: 1-way loop
- Electrification: Battery electric vehicle
- Operating speed: 15 miles per hour (24 km/h)

The Neighborhood Autonomous Vehicle Innovation (NAVI) is an electrically-driven, autonomous shuttle service in Jacksonville, Florida. The system first opened in 2025 and features twelve stations in Downtown Jacksonville.

NAVI is owned by the Jacksonville Transportation Authority (JTA) and operated by Beep. The route primarily operates along Bay Street on a one-way loop in mixed traffic, with a dedicated lane along Gator Bowl Boulevard near EverBank Stadium.

NAVI typically only operates on weekdays, although JTA does occasionally operate the system on weekends when there are special events downtown.

As of 2026, NAVI is the first and only operational automated road vehicle in the United States in permanent public transit service.

== History ==
NAVI is intended to serve as the first phase of the Ultimate Urban Circulator, a program to replace the Jacksonville Skyway monorail with an autonomous vehicle network.

The service is scheduled to shut down on December 31, 2026 as part of widespread cost-cutting measures by JTA.

== Features ==
As of 2026, the route is 3.5 miles (5.6 km) long and uses fourteen Ford E-Transit vehicles.

== See also ==
- Personal rapid transit
- Vehicular automation#Shared autonomous vehicles
