= Riverplace station =

Jacksonville Skyway monorail station in Florida, United States

Riverplace
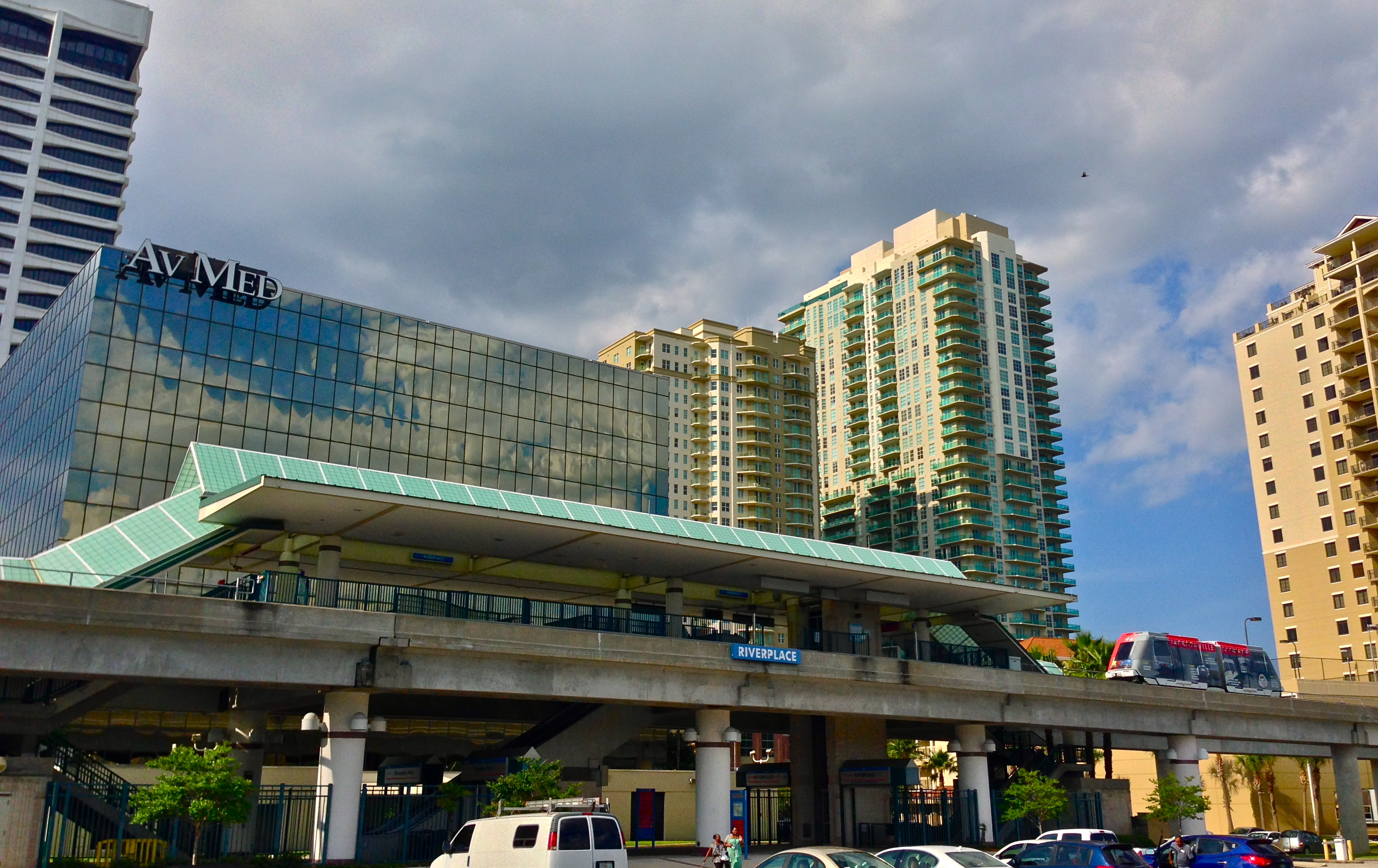

General information
- Location: 801 Flagler Avenue; Jacksonville, Florida
- Coordinates: 30°19′03.5″N 81°39′24″W
- Owner: Jacksonville Transportation Authority
- Platforms: 1 island platform
- Tracks: 2
- Connections: Jacksonville Water Taxi

Construction
- Structure type: Elevated
- Accessible: Yes

History
- Opened: November 1, 2000

Services
Preceding station	Jacksonville Transportation Authority	Following station
Kings Avenue Terminus	Skyway	San Marco toward Central
Location

Riverplace station is a Skyway monorail station in Jacksonville, Florida. It is located at the corner of Mary Street and Flagler Avenue in the Southbank area of Downtown Jacksonville. It is near Riverplace Tower.

== History ==
The Riverplace station was developed as part of the Jacksonville Skyway's Southbank segment, begun in 1995, which carried the Skyway over the St. Johns River via the Acosta Bridge. The Riverplace and Kings Avenue stations opened on November 1, 2000, completing the Southbank segment as well as Phase I of the Skyway's development. As such, these stations are the most recent additions to the system. The station was severely damaged by fire on the night of March 11, 2009 and was temporarily shut down. After $269,000 in repairs it reopened for October 31, 2009, accommodating the annual Florida–Georgia football game and Halloween.

The next stations in the line are San Marco station to the west and Kings Avenue station to the east. The station is near the Riverplace Tower office tower and several other commercial and residential buildings; other nearby points of interest include the Jacksonville Riverwalk and Treaty Oak Park.
