= Kings Avenue =

Kings Avenue may refer to:

- Kings Avenue (JTA Skyway), a station on the JTA Skyway in Jacksonville, Florida
- Kings Avenue, Canberra, a road in Canberra
- Königsallee, a boulevard in Düsseldorf
- Kings Avenue Mall, a shopping mall located in Paphos, Cyprus
- King's Avenue, London, a road in Clapham Park
- King's Avenue, Singapore, a road in Sembawang
