= Jacksonville Skyway =

People mover in Jacksonville, Florida, US

Coordinates: 30.327087°N 81.662331°W

Skyway
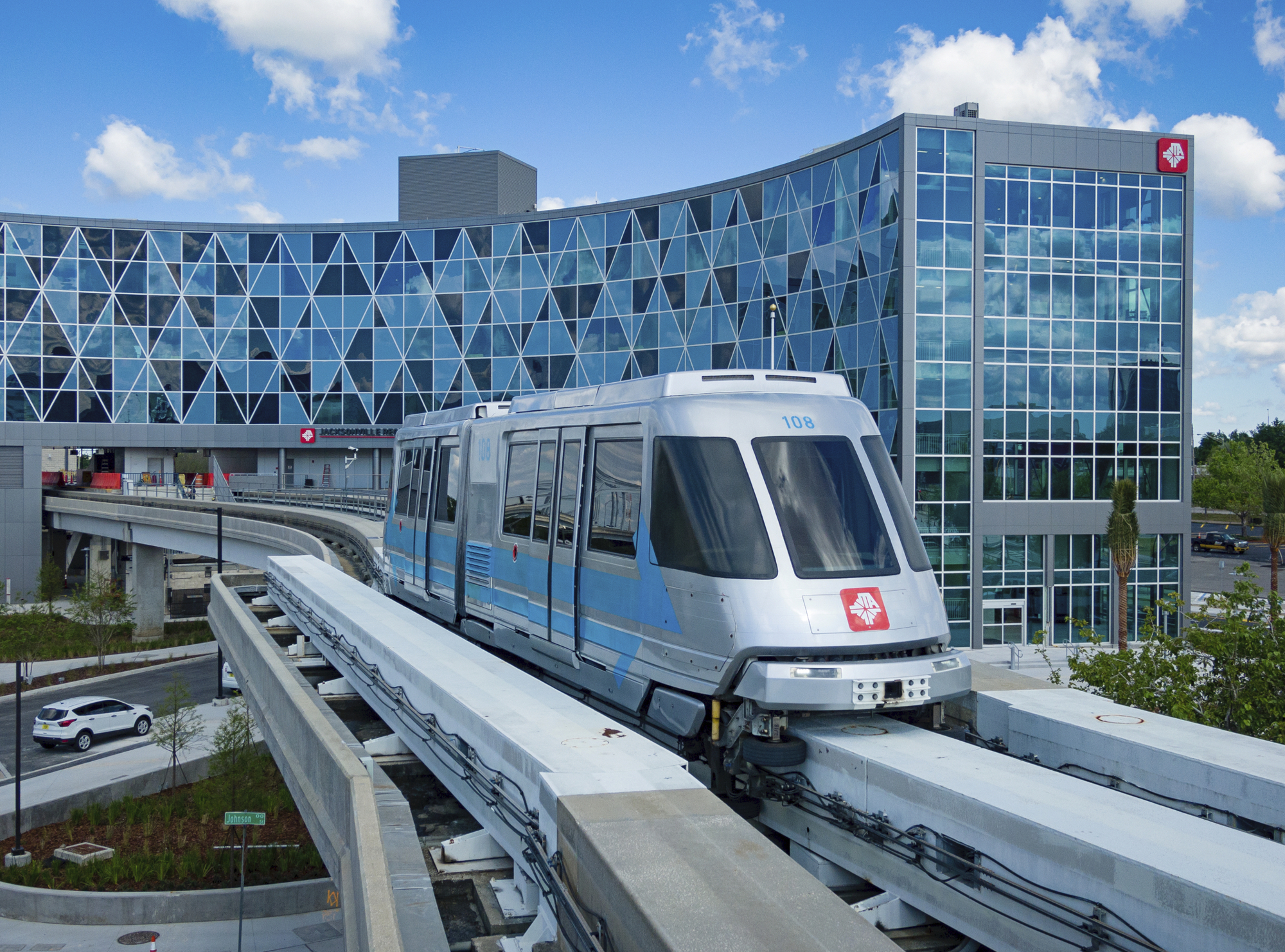
- Skyway departing the Jacksonville Regional Transportation Center at LaVilla

Overview
- Owner: Jacksonville Transportation Authority
- Locale: Jacksonville, Florida
- Termini: Rosa Parks (north); LaVilla (west) Kings Avenue (south)
- Stations: 8

Service
- Type: Automated people mover Monorail
- Services: 2
- Daily ridership: 1,000 (weekdays, Q2 2026)
- Ridership: 253,200 (2025)

History
- Opened: May 30, 1989; 37 years ago
- Last extension: 2000
- Closed: October 30, 2026; 21 days ago

Technical
- Line length: 2.5 mi (4.0 km)
- Num of tracks: 2
- Character: Elevated
- Track gauge: Monorail
- Electrification: Third rail
- Operating speed: 35 mph (56 km/h)

The Skyway was an elevated automated people mover monorail in Jacksonville, Florida. It consisted of 2.5 miles (4.0 km) of track in Jacksonville's urban core and served eight stations in the Downtown, LaVilla, and Southbank neighborhoods. It opened in 1989 and was operated by the Jacksonville Transportation Authority (JTA). In 2025, the system had a ridership of 253,200, or about 1,000 per day as of the second quarter of 2026.

== History ==
=== Planning and development ===
Plans to build an automated people mover in Downtown Jacksonville were first proposed in 1972 to deal with traffic and parking issues in the urban core. In 1976, the city incorporated the system into its mobility plan, hoping to attract interest from the Urban Mass Transit Administration's Downtown Peoplemover Program. The initial study was undertaken by the Florida Department of Transportation and Jacksonville's planning department, who took the Skyway project to the Jacksonville Transportation Authority (JTA) in 1977 for further development. Early proposals recommended a comprehensive system over 4 miles (6.4 km) long that would connect into adjacent neighborhoods, but the project's route and scope were greatly reduced over the years to meet budget constraints and UMTA's parameters.

After several stops and starts, UMTA selected Jacksonville as one of seven cities to receive federal funding for the "Automated Skyway Express" in 1985. Two other related projects are Miami's Metromover and Detroit's People Mover. UMTA's approved plan called for the construction of a 2.5-mile (4.0 km) Phase I system to be built in three segments; the agency awarded JTA $23.5 million for the initial 0.7-mile (1.1 km) Phase I-A segment.

=== Construction and opening ===
In July 1987, JTA awarded a contract to Matra to construct a VAL people mover along the Phase I-A segment, using rubber-tired VAL 256 vehicles. Work was completed in May 1989 at a cost of $34.6 million, and the system opened for revenue service on May 30, 1989. At its opening, the Skyway had two vehicles, serving three stations – Central, Jefferson, and Terminal – on its east-west route along Bay Street in downtown Jacksonville.

=== Conversion to monorail, expansion ===
Subsequent extensions were planned to take the Skyway north to Florida Community College at Jacksonville (FCCJ), and then south across the St. Johns River over the Acosta Bridge. Construction began on the northern extension by 1993.

The original contract with Matra expired in 1991, and negotiations for a new contract failed. In October 1994, Bombardier Transportation was awarded a new contract to revamp the existing east–west segment with new technology, and to complete the remaining Phase I extensions.

The system was shut down on December 15, 1996, to replace the VAL vehicles and track with new monorail equipment designed by Bombardier, based on the UM III system. Over the next year, the existing track was converted, and a new extension was built to the north along Hogan Street, adding the Hemming Plaza and FCCJ stations. The extended system, with five stations, reopened on December 15, 1997. The two original VAL 256 vehicles were sold to the Chicago Department of Aviation for use on the similar Airport Transit System at O'Hare International Airport.

The initial southern segment, to San Marco Station on Jacksonville's Southbank, opened on October 30, 1998. On November 1, 2000, the Riverplace and Kings Avenue stations opened, completing the Southbank segment and Phase I of the Skyway.

FCCJ station was renamed Rosa Parks/FCCJ on August 28, 2006. In March 2009, a large electrical fire broke out at Riverplace station, causing significant damage that closed the station until that October.

=== Fares and ridership ===
Ridership figures on the Skyway were significantly below initial projections; while JTA originally anticipated 100,000 riders monthly, it averaged less than a third of that by 2009. The primary reasons are the decline of the downtown workforce and lack of connections to other neighborhoods and modes of transit. The system became a major point of contention in Jacksonville, with critics considering it a "ride to nowhere" and a waste of resources. In 2010, after underperforming for over twenty years, The Florida Times-Union called it "a Jacksonville joke for a generation". However, others argued that expansion of the system and downtown revitalization could make it a success.

The Skyway's fare was originally 35¢; it was raised to 50¢ on October 1, 2007.

In February 2012, the Skyway was temporarily made free to ride until a new payment system was installed. Ridership jumped 61%—to 481,000 annually. Ridership in 2013 averaged nearly 4,000 on weekdays (the system was closed on weekends except for special events) and JTA renewed the fare-free policy through the end of 2016. As of August 2025, it continued to be free to ride. In light of the momentum, JTA Director Nat Ford announced the agency would apply for grants to expand the system with a new station in the fast-growing Brooklyn neighborhood.

=== Recent history and current status ===
As part of the construction of the agency's Jacksonville Regional Transportation Center (JRTC), the Convention Center station closed for a period of time to allow for the dismantling of original station elements (such as the overhead station canopy) and construct the new facility partially over the existing tracks. The existing platform was kept but with modifications made in order to tie everything into the new facility. While the new JRTC opened on May 4, 2020, the Skyway did not commence service to the facility until July of that year due to a temporary pause in Skyway service caused by COVID-19.

On March 3, 2021, JTA announced that it had approved plans to convert a portion of its Skyway maintenance facility property off Leila St in the Brooklyn neighborhood to the planned Brooklyn station, with construction to begin in September 2021 and completion projected for some time in early 2022.

All Skyway service was scheduled to cease after November 2, 2026, as part of larger JTA budget-related service cuts. However, due to "unexpected operational circumstances," the service was closed early on October 30, 2026.

== Operations ==
As of 2026, the Skyway was free to ride, and typically only operated on weekdays from 6 a.m. to 9 p.m., with weekend service limited to special events. It was internally designated route 605 by the JTA. Service was scheduled to operate every 15 minutes on two routes: one between Rosa Parks and LaVilla stations, and one between Kings Avenue and Central. Service was ceased indefinitely in the evening of October 30, 2026.

=== Route ===
The 2.5-mile (4.0 km) route was entirely elevated, and included eight stations: five in the Downtown Core and LaVilla areas, and three across the St. Johns River on the Southbank. It began at Rosa Parks station in the north, and continued south along Hogan Street, turning to continue west at Bay Street. West of Central station, the line followed Bay Street to the Jacksonville Regional Transportation Center at LaVilla, while a branch line breaks south, crossing the St. Johns River via the Acosta Bridge.

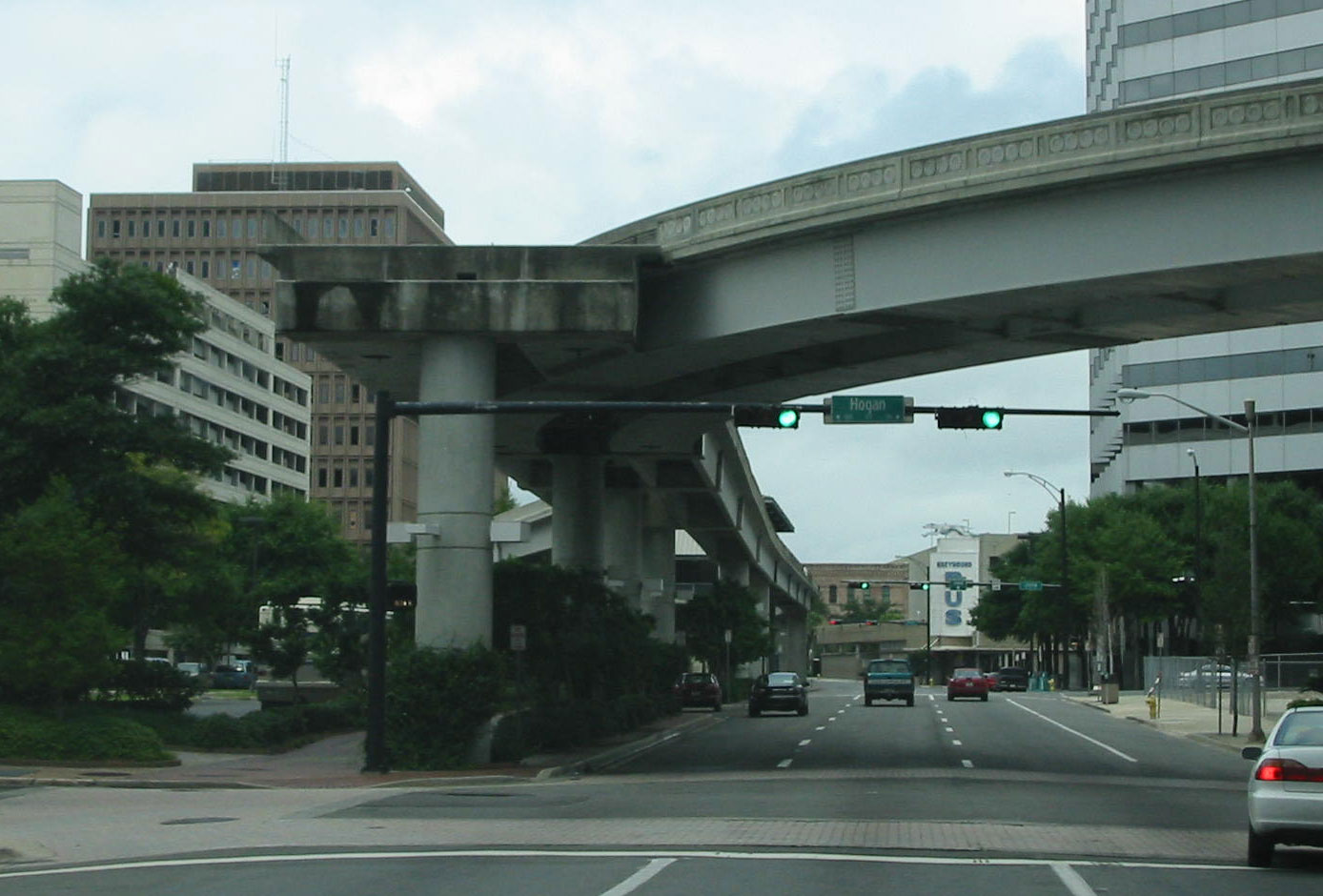
Skyway track curve at Hogan and Bay Streets, between the Central and James Weldon Johnson Park stations

The Skyway's guideway was an elevated two-way monorail track, with beams 34 inches (86 cm) wide and 28 inches (71 cm) tall, fixed on an 11-foot (3.4 m) wide guideway with parapet walls. Each driverless train operated under automatic train control, travelling at up to 35 mph (56 km/h), and were capable of operating as multiple units.

==== Stations ====
| Station | Location | Opened | Connections |
|---|---|---|---|
| Rosa Parks Transit Station | 201 W Union St | 1997 | 10, 19, First Coast Flyer Red Line |
| James Weldon Johnson Park | 301 Hogan St | 1997 | |
| Central | 300 W Bay St | 1989 | 1, 3, 11, 18, 205, 800, 801, 811; Water Taxi |
| Jefferson | 800 W Bay St | 1989 | |
| JRTC at LaVilla | 1101 W Bay St | 2020 | 1, 3, 4, 8, 10, 11, 12, 13, 14, 16, 17, 18, 19, 21, 22, 25, 27, 31, 53, 80, 202, 205, First Coast Flyer; Greyhound; Megabus |
| San Marco | 701 San Marco Bl | 1998 | 8 Water Taxi |
| Riverplace | 801 Flagler Av | 2000 | Water Taxi |
| Kings Avenue | 1003 Kings Av | 2000 | 27, First Coast Flyer Green Line |

=== Rolling stock ===
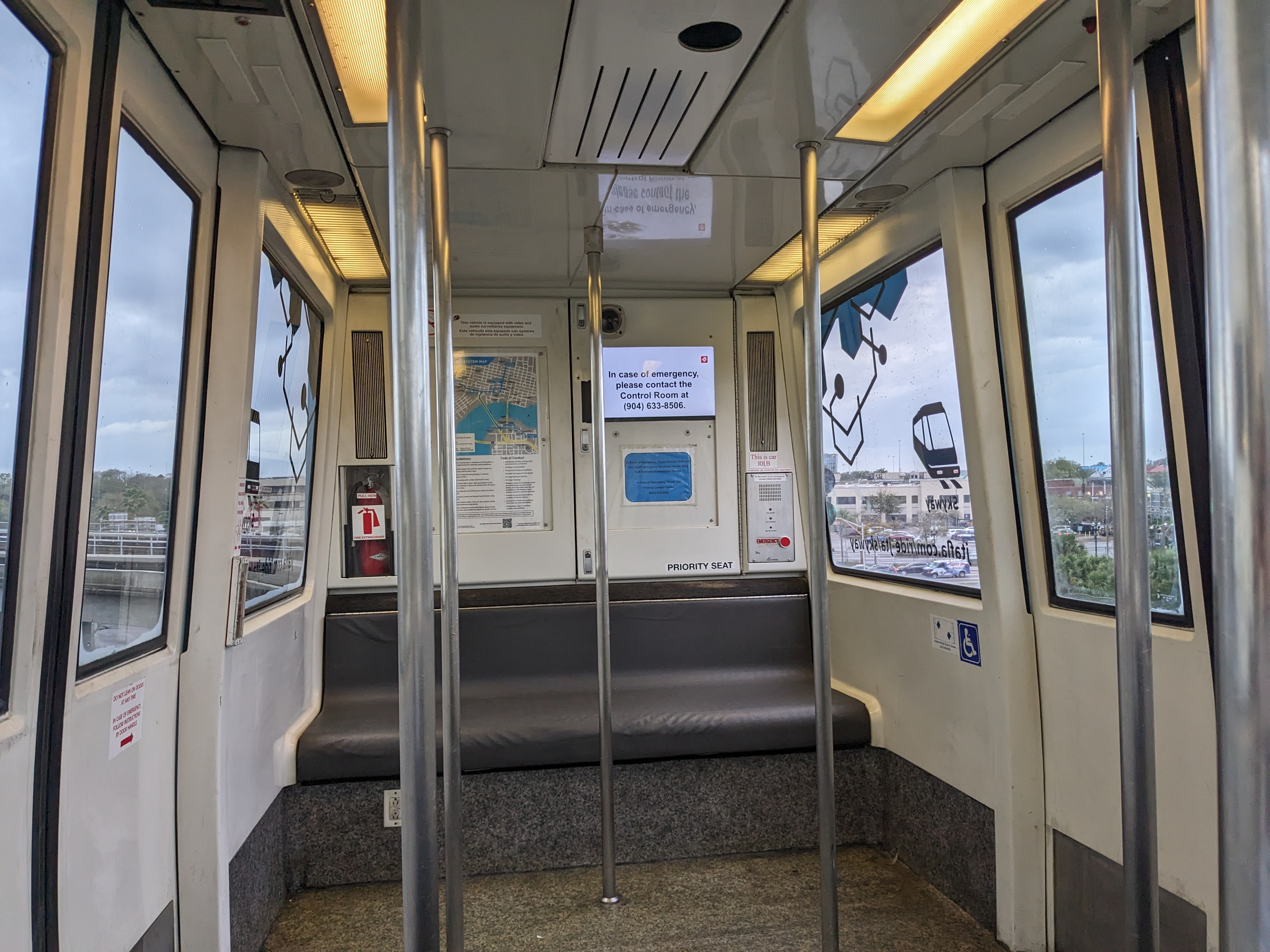
Interior of a Skyway vehicle

The Skyway operated with a fleet of driverless UM III monorail vehicles manufactured by Bombardier Transportation in 1997. Each vehicle had two passenger compartments, and a capacity of 56 passengers.

At the time of the system's reopening in 1997, its fleet included 10 vehicles, though as of February 2026, only two remained in operational condition.

== Future ==
The JTA considers the Skyway to be obsolete and near the end of its useful life. The agency has publicly considered decommissioning or redeveloping the system since 2016.

In 2015, JTA officials stated that four of the Skyway's 10 vehicles had been decommissioned, and that due to their age, it would be prohibitively difficult to repair or refurbish them. It was further stated in 2016 would be cost-prohibitive to expand the current system.

The review considered options to refurbish the current rolling stock, buy replacement vehicles, expand the system, tear down the structure or convert it to alternative use such as a walking path. JTA said in January 2017 that they are "trying to keep the Skyway operating for another five years as it determines the future of the system" As of March 2026, the JTA was seeking public input on six potential plans for the future of the Skyway:

- Continuing to operate the Skyway in its current condition, with existing vehicles and infrastructure, until they fail
- Rehabilitating the existing vehicles and upgrading the control system
- Replacing the vehicles and track with a different model of automated people mover
- Converting the existing guideway into an elevated road for an expansion of the NAVI autonomous shuttle service
- Decommissioning the Skyway and repurposing its guideway into an elevated shared-use trail
- Demolishing the Skyway entirely and expanding NAVI exclusively at street level, with new stations following the route of the Skyway

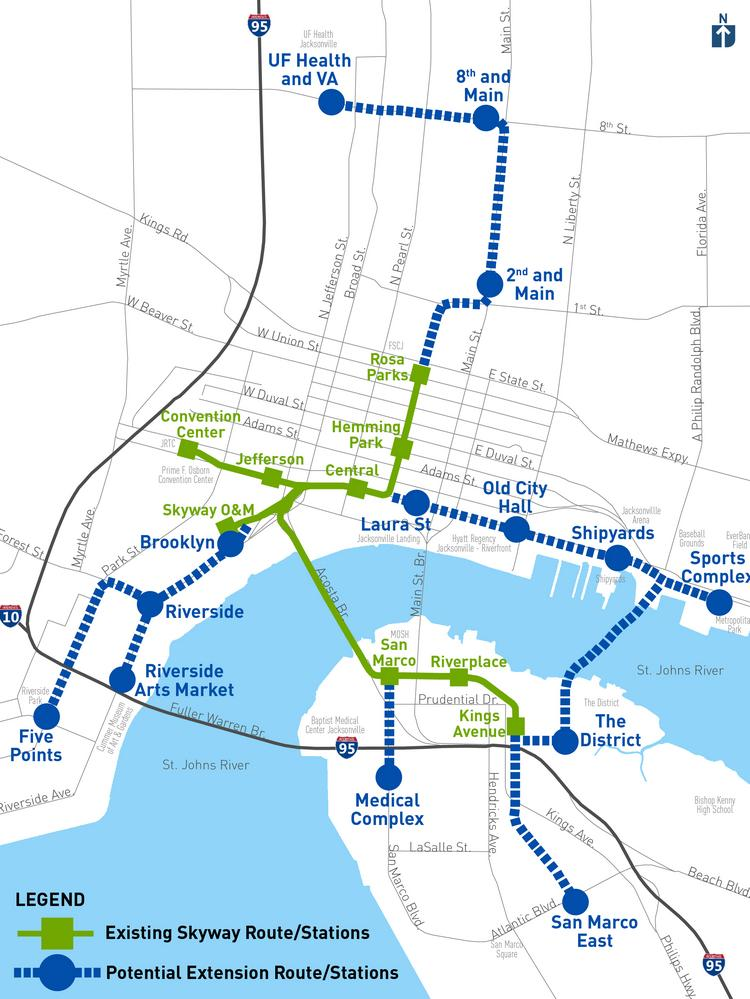
Map of existing Skyway network and proposed U2C routing, published in 2018

In December 2016, JTA staff publicly recommended the replacement of the monorail with shared autonomous vehicles, in a project named the Ultimate Urban Circulator (U2C). Such vehicles would operate both on the existing Skyway guideway and at street level.

Since 2017, the JTA has pursued research and testing of autonomous shuttles from multiple manufacturers.

The system would have some similarity to personal rapid transit or group rapid transit except at ground level it will either run in mixed traffic or its lanes will have grade crossings with other traffic.

In December 2017, JTA launched the U2C AV Test and Learn track which serves as an outdoor classroom to test and evaluate multiple vehicles and their associated technologies from the AV shuttle industry. As of 2020 vehicles from three different suppliers have been trialed.

In 2019, the JTA indicated an interim phase would involve the modification of one of the monorail beams to allow use by autonomous vehicles while the Skyway continues to run on the other side.

JTA revealed more detailed plans in 2020 that the U2C network will have 10 route miles – elevated track and ground level roadways – also covering surrounding areas such as San Marco, Springfield, and Brooklyn/Riverside (with the future possibility of connecting it with the proposed First Coast Commuter Rail network).

In May 2021, the Jacksonville City Council voted to remove $132 million from the budget for the U2C, leaving $240 million for the project.

In October 2026, JTA announced a pause in operation of the entire Skyway system, ending service by November 2, 2026. The termination of service was announced in conjunction with cuts to JTA bus and NAVI services.

== See also ==
- List of monorail systems
- List of United States railroads
- List of Florida railroads
- Transportation in Jacksonville, Florida
