= St. Elmo W. Acosta =

American public servant (1875-1947)

St. Elmo W. Acosta (January 12, 1875 – November 1947) was a city commissioner in Jacksonville, Florida and is the man after whom the Acosta Bridge was named.

Born in Jacksonville on January 12, 1875, Acosta enjoyed a long career of public service. Although he was a noted city commissioner, state legislator, and city parks commissioner, he will always be known as the man who championed the cause of a pedestrian and automobile span across the St. Johns River. Now known as a city of bridges, Acosta pushed through the funding for the first for the people. He was known during his time for a fanatical devotion to a greener Jacksonville, but was against female suffrage.

When the bridge that was to eventually bear his name was completed in 1921, St. Elmo Acosta (known as "Chic") led the first parade across the original metal span. Although then known as the St. Johns River Bridge, shortly after Acosta's death in November 1947, State Senator John Mathews (whose name would eventually grace another downtown Jacksonville bridge) pushed that the Florida Legislature should rename the span after Acosta. Governor Fuller Warren (another bridge namesake) re-christened the bridge on August 17, 1949. The original span was replaced in 1991, but the new concrete and steel span still bears his name.
