= Jacksonville Water Taxi =

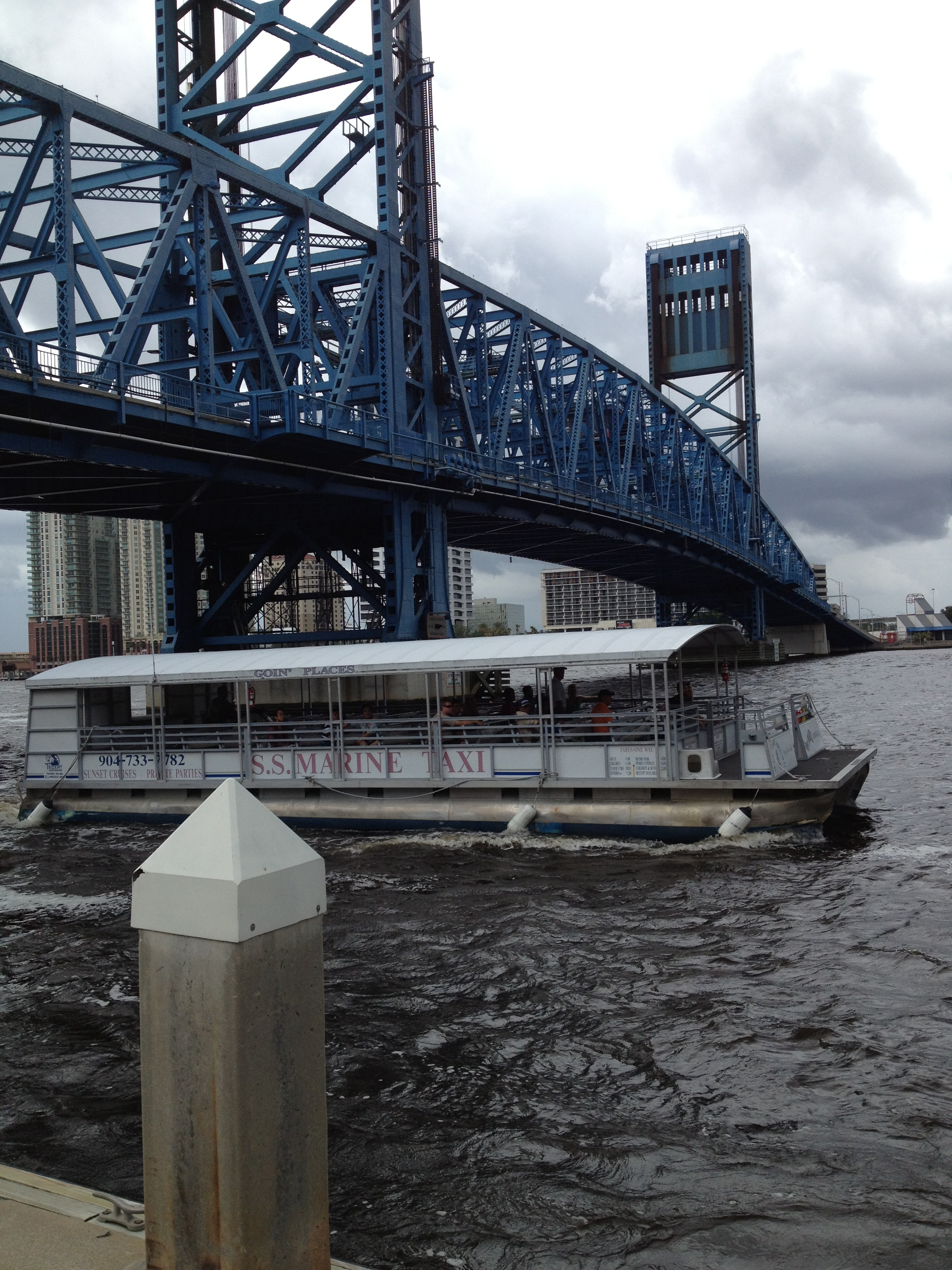
- Locale: Jacksonville, Florida
- Waterway: St. Johns River
- Transit type: Water taxi
- Owner: Jacksonville Transportation Authority
- Operator: Lakeshore Marine
- Began operation: 1987
- No. of vessels: 4
- No. of terminals: 5
- Daily ridership: 1,800 (weekdays, Q1 2025)
- Yearly ridership: 424,800 (2024)
- Website: jaxrivertaxi.com

The Jacksonville Water Taxi, or Jacksonville River Taxi, is a water taxi service in Jacksonville, Florida. Established in 1987, it ferries passengers across the St. Johns River between the Northbank and Southbank of Downtown Jacksonville. Stops are located along the Riverwalks. In 2024, the system had a ridership of 424,800, or about 1,800 per day as of the first quarter of 2025.

== History ==
Water taxi service in Downtown Jacksonville began in 1987, with the opening of the Jacksonville Landing, a riverfront shopping and entertainment center. In the early years, a variety of companies ran water taxis out of the Landing, with the City of Jacksonville allowing any operator who passed the minimum U.S. Coast Guard safety regulations to start a water taxi business. This led to fierce competition during peak times and inconsistent service, with captains ignoring city regulations on routes and use of the stops to fight each other for customers. Eventually, the Jacksonville City Council Waterways Commission stepped in to demand improved service. Ultimately, in 2002, the City of Jacksonville adopted new regulations governing the Jacksonville Water Taxi, awarding a contract to a single operator who adheres to a consistent route and schedule.

The Jacksonville Water Taxi experienced a stoppage of service in 2014 when the City of Jacksonville failed to renew the operator's contract. The city's attempts to purchase and operate boats failed to come together. The city negotiated a new contract with Lakeshore Marine in April 2015.

== Operation ==
In October 2015, Lakeshore Marine operated four boats, two seating 100, one seating 60 and one seating 50. The Jacksonville River Taxi currently operates on a circular route between four stops along the Jacksonville Riverwalks: boats depart the Jacksonville Landing on the Northbank for three stops on Southbank. A fifth stop at Metropolitan Park Marina is open during events in the Stadium District.

=== Stops ===
Stops	Connections
Jacksonville Landing Northbank 30°19′28″N 81°39′35″W	Jacksonville Skyway: Central station; JTA Bus; Greyhound
Friendship Fountain Southbank 30°19′14″N 81°39′36″W	Jacksonville Skyway: San Marco station; JTA Bus
Doubletree Hotel Southbank 30°19′14″N 81°39′26″W	Jacksonville Skyway: Riverplace station
Lexington Hotel Southbank 30°19′06″N 81°39′12″W	Jacksonville Skyway: Riverplace Station
Metropolitan Park Marina Stadium District 30°19′11″N 81°38′31″W (Special events only)	JTA Bus
