= FEC Strauss Trunnion Bascule Bridge =

Bridge in Florida, United States of America

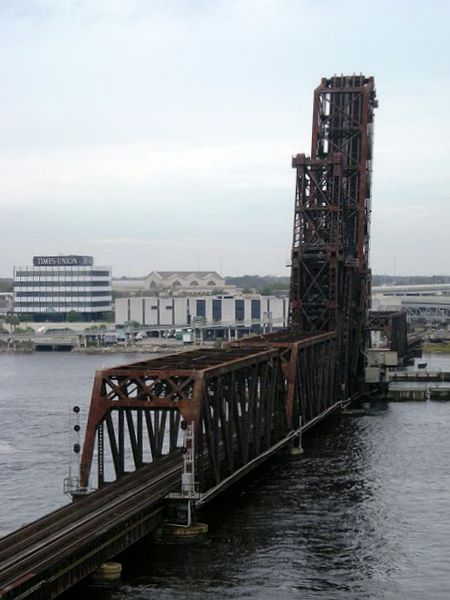
- Florida East Coast Railway bascule bridge in Jacksonville, Florida
- Coordinates: 30°19′21″N 81°39′56″W
- Carries: 2 tracks of the Florida East Coast Railway
- Crosses: St. Johns River
- Locale: Jacksonville, Florida
- Maintained by: Florida East Coast Railway

Characteristics
- Design: Simple truss bridge with bascule lift span, plate girder approaches

History
- Designer: Joseph Strauss
- Opened: 1925

Location
- Interactive map of FEC Strauss Trunnion Bascule Bridge

The FEC Strauss Trunnion Bascule Bridge is a double track railroad bridge spanning the St. Johns River in Jacksonville, Florida.

Completed in 1925 by the Florida East Coast Railway, this structure replaced a single-track swing bridge which opened on January 5, 1890. The current structure is a simple truss bridge with plate girder approaches and a bascule lift allowing ships to pass. It is adjacent to the Acosta Bridge.

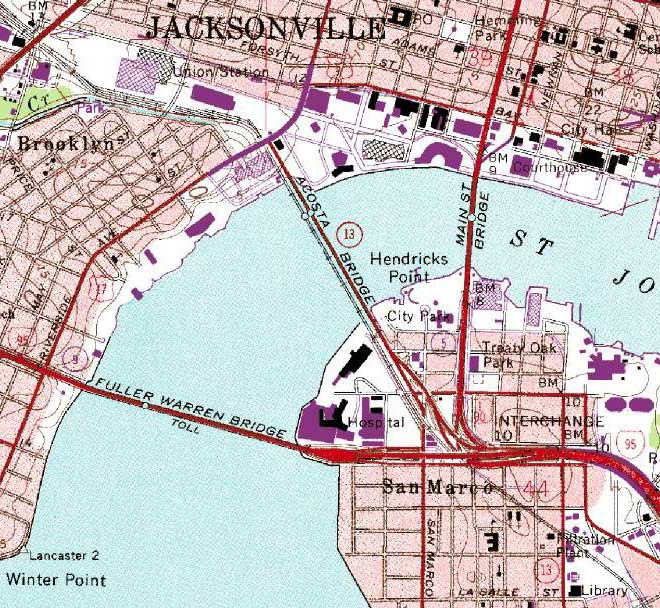
A 1992 map of the FEC bridge (adjacent to the Acosta Bridge)

== References and external links ==
- Mallery, Paul (2000). Bridge and Trestle Handbook (4th ed.). Newton, New Jersey, U.S.: Carstens Publications. ISBN 978-0-9118-6899-9.
- Photos and information on the bridge
