= Kings Avenue station =

Jacksonville Skyway monorail station in Florida, United States

Kings Avenue
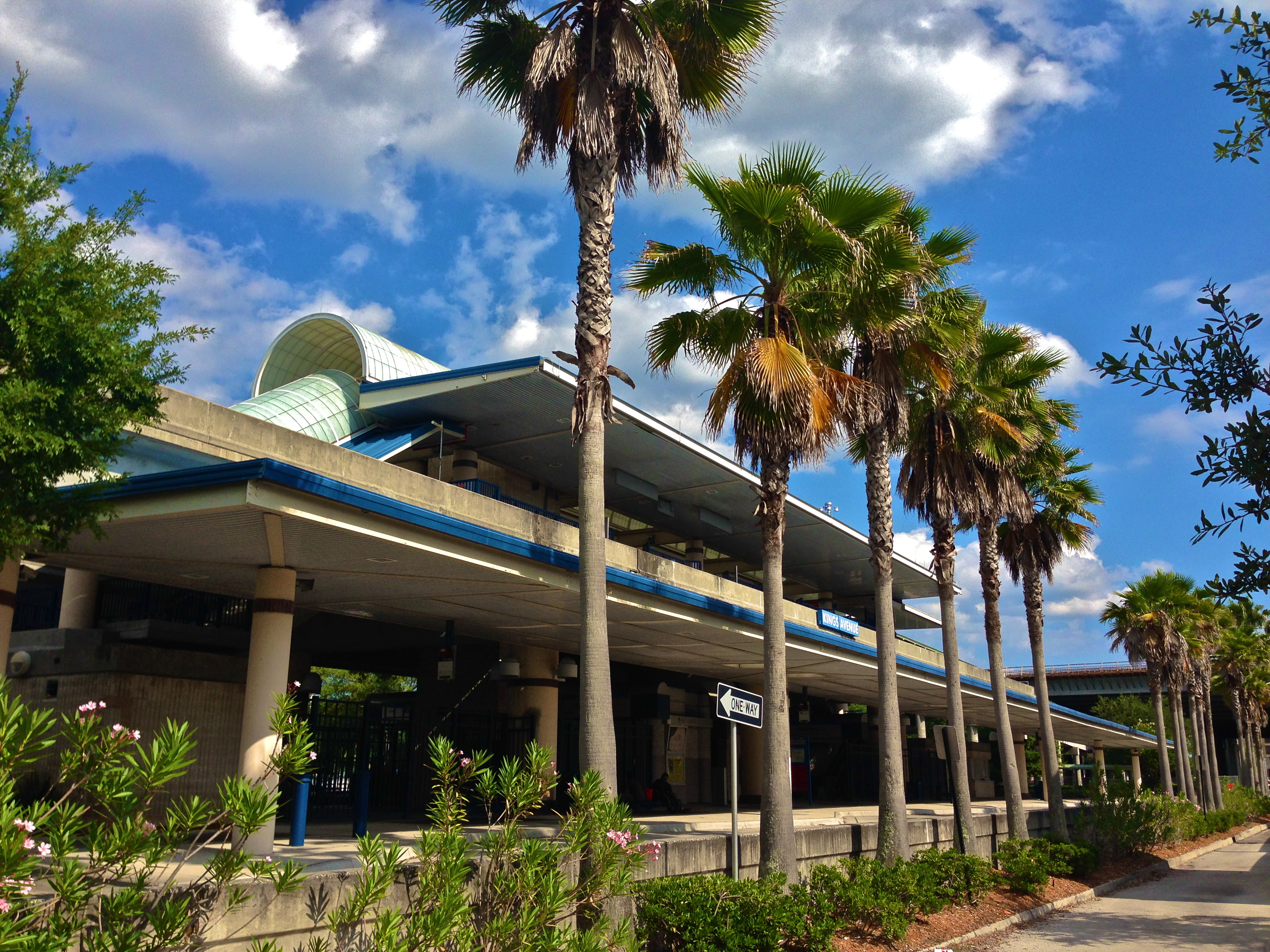
- Kings Avenue Station from the Bus Loop

General information
- Location: 1003 Kings Avenue; Jacksonville, Florida
- Coordinates: 30°18′55″N 81°39′11″W
- Owner: Jacksonville Transportation Authority
- Platforms: 1 island platform
- Tracks: 2
- Connections: JTA Bus: 27; First Coast Flyer: Blue

Construction
- Structure type: Elevated
- Parking: 1,717 spaces
- Accessible: Yes

History
- Opened: November 1, 2000

Services
Preceding station	Jacksonville Transportation Authority	Following station
Terminus	Skyway	Riverplace toward Central
Location

Kings Avenue station is a Skyway monorail station in Jacksonville, Florida. It is located on Onyx Street between Prudential Drive and Louisa Street in the Southbank area of Downtown Jacksonville.

== History ==
The Kings Avenue station was developed as part of the Jacksonville Skyway's Southbank segment, which carried the Skyway over the St. Johns River via the Acosta Bridge. This station and the adjacent Riverplace station opened on November 1, 2000, completing the Southbank segment as well as Phase I of the Skyway's development. It is connected to the Kings Avenue Garage, a park-and-ride garage, via walkway passing beneath Interstate 95. Some Jacksonville Transportation Authority bus lines run through the station.

The station is the Skyway's southern terminus; with the Riverplace station being next in the line. The station is near a number of hotels and residential towers.

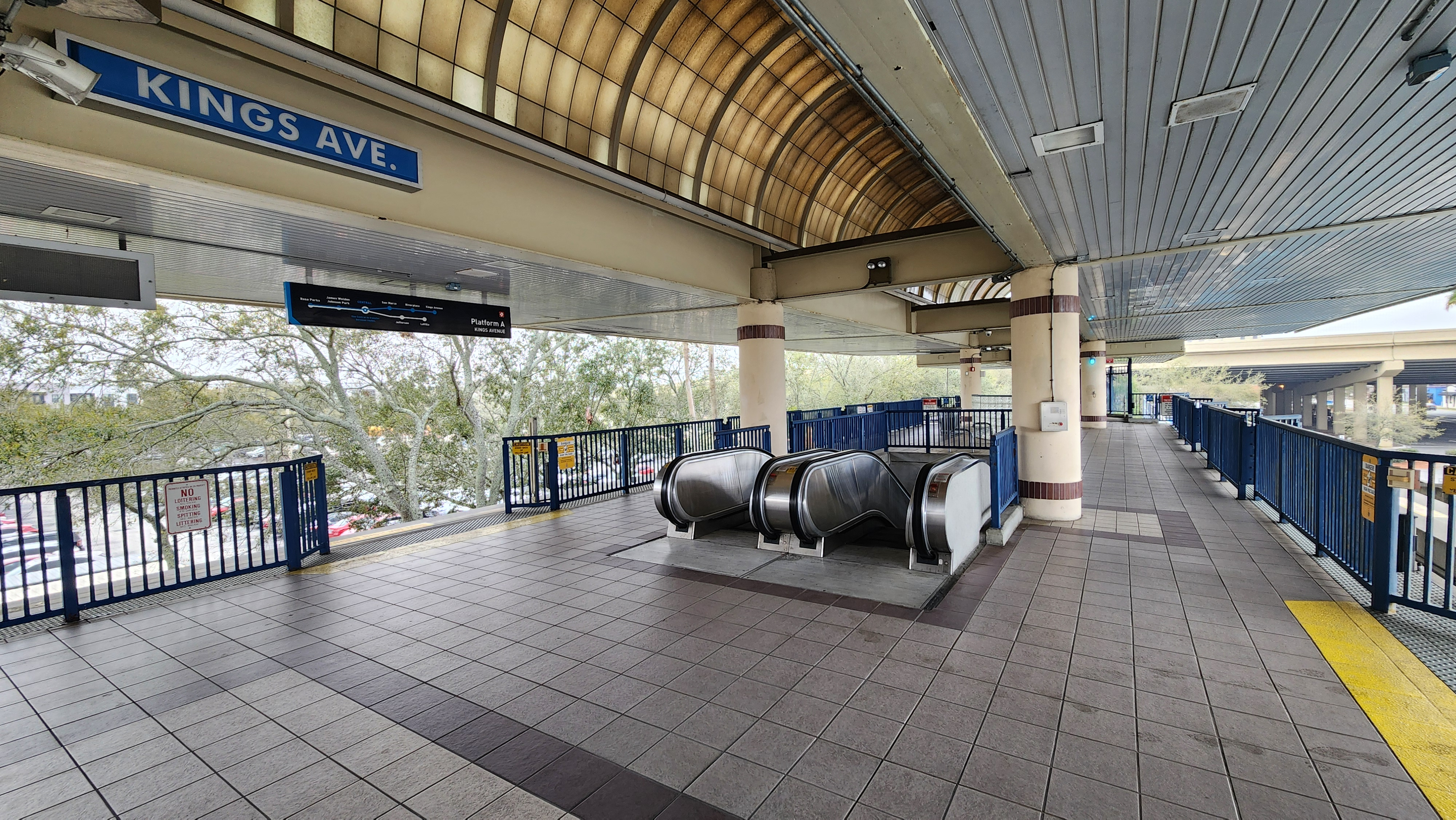
Platform
