= Bryan-Gooding Planetarium =

Planetarium in Jacksonville, Florida

Coordinates: 30.318666°N 81.659931°W

Bryan-Gooding Planetarium in the Alexander Brest Science Theatre is a planetarium in the Museum of Science and History in Jacksonville, Florida, U.S. It was built in 1988 and featured a 60-foot-diameter (18 m) dome-shaped projection screen, JBL stereo sound system, and a Zeiss Jena Optical mechanical planetarium star projector. The facility has seating for 200, and approximately 60,000 people see a planetarium show each year.

The planetarium was built with a donation by the late Alexander Brest, and was originally known as the Alexander Brest Planetarium. The theater initially used the Dove X / DORK automation system for slide projectors and special effects projectors. In 1996, the automation system was upgraded to the JHE automation system. The star projector (Planetarium) was built by a German company named Carl Zeiss AG, and was capable of displaying 8,900 stars. The projector used two 500-watt lamps at each end of the projector.

Michael Reynolds was the first planetarium director who designed the first planetarium programs which included a lecture series, workshops for teachers and a seminar about telescope makers.

== Updated equipment ==
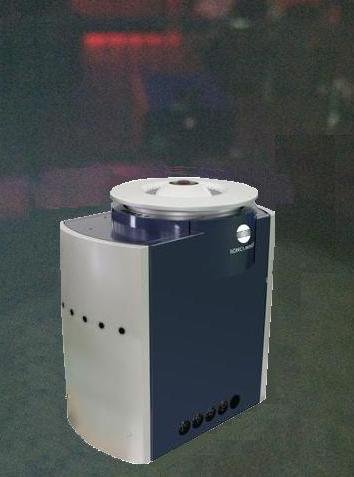
Konica Minolta Super Media

The Henry and Lucy Gooding Endowment and the Bryan family made a gift of nearly half a million dollars to MOSH in June 2010 to finance improvements to the Alexander Brest Space Theater. The seating, dome, and flooring were cleaned thoroughly, and the dome was repainted. However, the biggest improvement was the new Konica Minolta Super MediaGlobe II digital dome projection system which replaced the 22-year-old dome projector.

The high-resolution projection features 4096 x 2400 pixels, four times as many pixels as the best HDTV image. It has a contrast ratio of 10,000:1, but does not use an optical iris, so black images stay black and retain detail. The system can also display 3D digital space simulations using the Mitaka stella database from the National Astronomical Observatory of Japan.

In contrast to the Jena projector which can project 8,900 stars, the MediaGlobe II can project 118,000 stars. The system can also project weather occurrences, such as rain, snow, lightning and aurora. The upgrades have improved the planetarium's overall experience, and have attracted more people to the new shows that utilize the advanced equipment.

== New name ==
The planetarium was closed for two months for renovations from August 23, 2010 to October 23, 2010. When the improvements were completed, the facility was renamed The Bryan-Gooding Planetarium in the Alexander Brest Science Theatre.

== Music ==
In addition to the educational programs presented by the planetarium, the staff offers Cosmic Concerts on the first Friday nights of each month. The shows combine music (usually rock, pop or classical) with a multi-colored laser light show and video projected on the dome, interspersed with special effects and cosmic images of galaxies, nebulas, and pulsars. The museum also sells diffraction glasses which can enhance the viewing experience. The audio is recorded and played back digitally on the planetarium's 18,000-watt sound system. In early 2010, the aging laser light system began to require so much water to cool the equipment that the staff discontinued the Cosmic Concerts until the new laser projection system and multicolored LED lighting system were installed in late summer.
