= Museum of Science and History =

Museum in Jacksonville, Florida, U.S.

Museum of Science & History
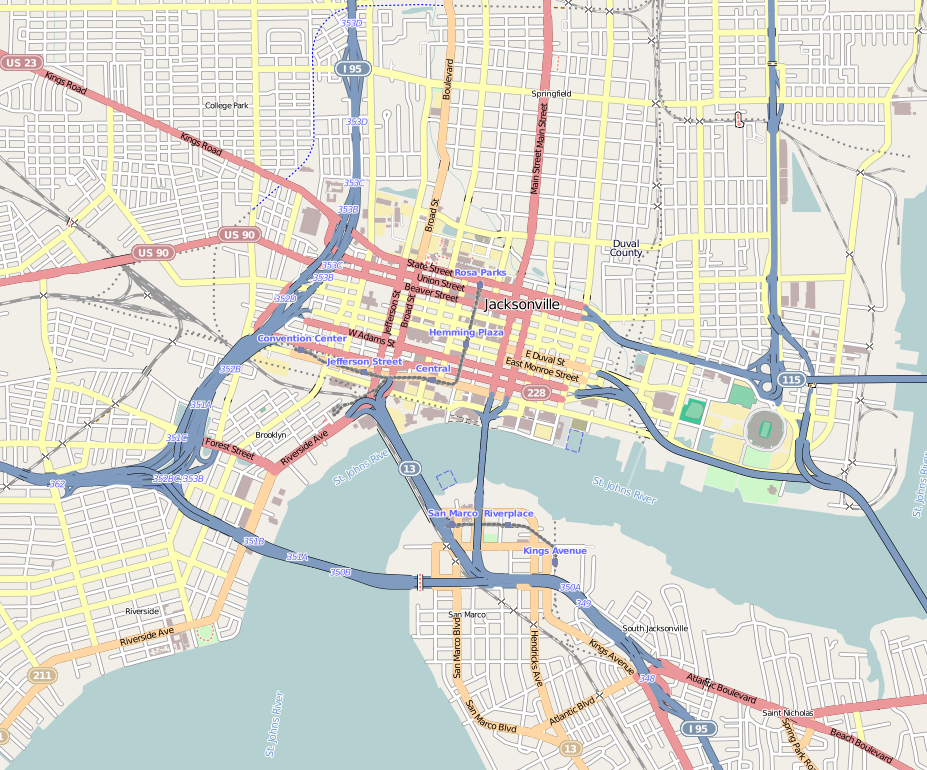
- Location within Central Jacksonville Location within Florida
- Former name: Jacksonville Children's Museum
- Established: 1941
- Location: 1025 Museum Circle, Jacksonville, Florida
- Coordinates: 30.319525°N 81.659901°W
- Public transit access: Bus: B7, CT3, SS6, SS8, SS35, SS50; Monorail: San Marco Station
- Website: www.themosh.org

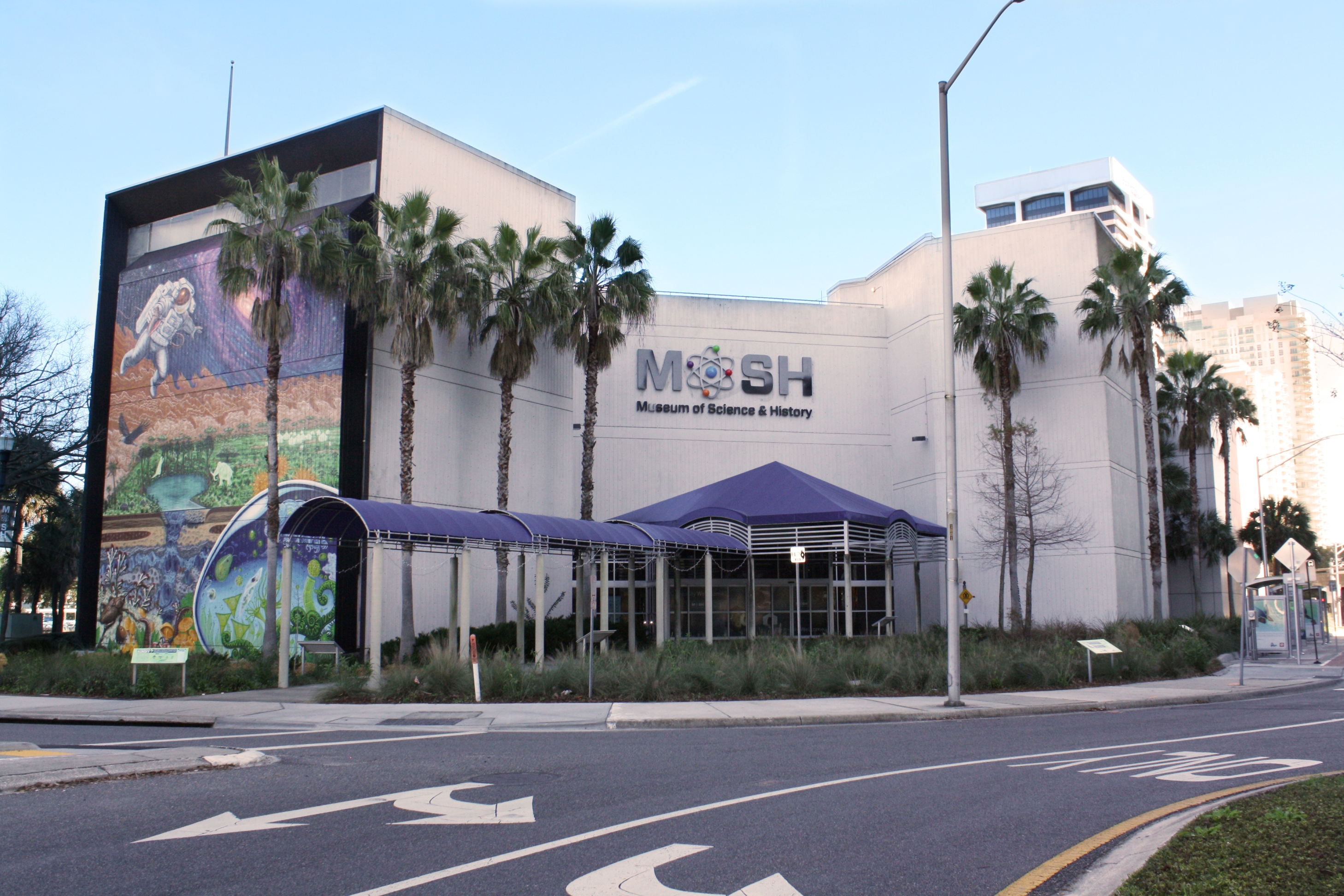

The Museum of Science & History (MOSH) was a museum in Jacksonville, Florida. It was a private, non-profit institution located on the Southbank Riverwalk, and the city's most visited museum. It specialized in science and local history exhibits. It featured a large traveling exhibit that changes quarterly, three floors of permanent and signature exhibits, and the Bryan-Gooding Planetarium.

== History ==
The roots of MOSH go back to 1941 when the Jacksonville Children's Museum was chartered.

The first permanent home was a Victorian mansion in Riverside. Construction began on the current city-owned location downtown in 1965, and the facility opened in 1969. The Jacksonville Children's Museum became the Jacksonville Museum of Arts and Sciences in 1977 and six years later, they were accredited by the American Alliance of Museums.

The name was changed to Museum of Science and History in 1988 and 37,500 square feet (3,480 m^{2}) of space was added, including the planetarium then known as the Alexander Brest Planetarium. The last building renovation occurred in 1994 resulting in a total of 82,200 square feet (7,640 m^{2}). In 2010 the Planetarium was upgraded with a new projector, sound system, and interior work, and renamed the Bryan-Gooding Planetarium.

The most recent accreditation by the American Alliance of Museums was in 2011. In 2013, the museum opened a new core exhibit, JEA PowerPlay: Understanding Our Energy Choices and the newly renovated JEA Science Theater. In 2016, the museum opened another new core exhibit, Health in Motion: Discover What MOVES.

== Genesis Project ==
In 2021, MOSH announced it would relocate to the Northbank of downtown Jacksonville with a new facility designed by architectural firm DLR Group. The new facility would increase the museum's space to 133,000 square feet (12,400 m^{2}).

In March 2025, the Jacksonville City Council approved an amended agreement allowing construction of a new building and surrounding park, with the city providing funding for park design, roadway and utility improvements, and a section of the Northbank Riverwalk. MOSH will enter a 40-year nominal lease for the city-owned building, paying $1 per year. By May 2025, MOSH reported raising over $95 million in private donations and stated the facility would create seven acres of indoor-outdoor learning experiences.

== Closure ==
In early May 2025, MOSH CEO Dr. Alistair Dove announced that the facility would close on August 31, 2025. Construction at the new location was expected to begin in early 2026 and take 18 months to complete. Dove described the existing museum as "an aging cultural facility" and noted that the transition required focusing resources on planning the new museum rather than operating the old one. Museum members were encouraged to visit NARM- or ASTC-affiliated museums at no cost.

The MOSH Southbank building closed on September 1, 2025, as the museum prepared to relocate to the proposed Northbank facility. The city-owned site is under review for demolition, with ELEV8 Demolition contracted to remove the structure. Staff of Jacksonville's Downtown Investment Authority determined the building was not salvageable, and the site is expected to be cleared for future development.

In January 2026, the Jacksonville Downtown Investment Authority unanimously approved up to $875,000 for demolition and asbestos abatement of the former MOSH Southbank building. The 58-year old structure was deemed unsuitable for reuse, and the city determined that demolition was in the public interest due to ongoing maintenance costs and redevelopment potential. At the same time, two-year CEO Dove tendered his resignation, citing a desire to "pursue new opportunities".

== Core exhibits ==
The core exhibits at MOSH include:

- Health in Motion - An interactive exhibit detailing the functions of the human body.
- Atlantic TAILS: Coastal Creatures of Northeast Florida
- JEA Powerplay
- JEA Science Theater - Scheduled live science demonstrations.
- Florida Naturalist's Center - An exhibition of the local amphibians, reptiles, and birds of Northeast Florida.
- Currents of Time: A History of Jacksonville & Northeast Florida - History of Jacksonville & The First Coast from Pre-Columbian to the 1950s.
- Hixon Native Plant Courtyard - Northeast Florida native environment encouraging awareness and preservation of native species.
- Space Science Gallery - Orientation space for the Bryan-Gooding Planetarium to learn about the innovation and history of space exploration.
- Interpreting Northeast Florida: A Historic Mural by Elmer Grey
- Kidspace - Interactive exhibit for children under the age of 5.
- Bryan-Gooding Planetarium - Multiple daily planetarium shows in one of the largest single-lens planetariums in the United States.

== Previous exhibits ==
Displays on the second third floor are known as travelling exhibits.

- Playing With Lights used lasers to manipulate light. At twenty-one different stations, visitors could poke, prod, and bend light.
- Bicentennial exhibit showed how occurrences such as fires, floods, disease, and other monumental events have shaped Jacksonville's economy, environment, and future.
- WeaveTales sought to make people aware of refugees and their families. The exhibit utilized information about North Florida refugees and highlighted a woman's journey to Jacksonville. Previously shown at Museum of Contemporary Art Jacksonville.
