= Central station (Jacksonville) =

Monorail station in Florida, United States

Central
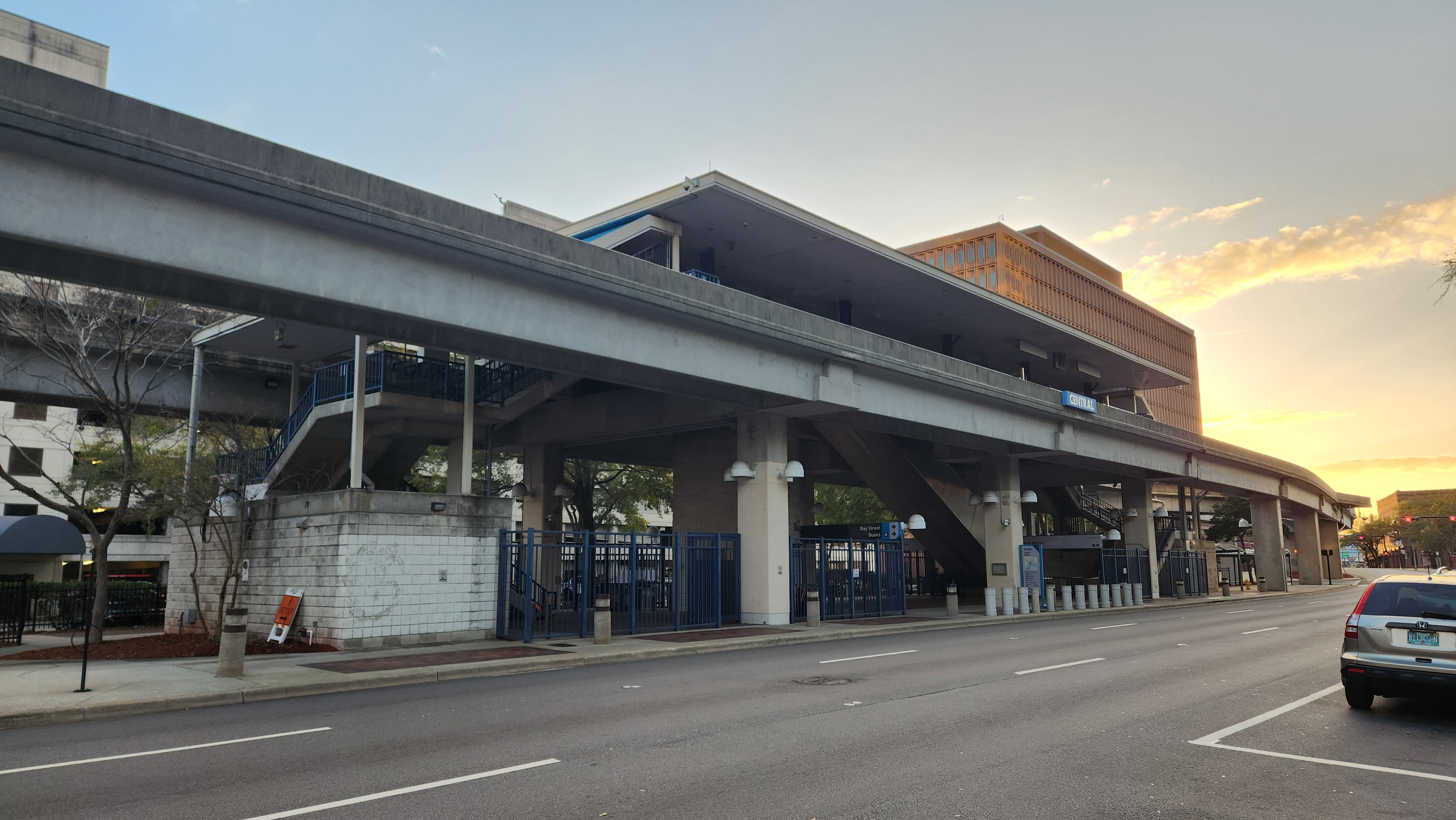

General information
- Location: 300 Bay Street West; Jacksonville, Florida
- Coordinates: 30.327087°N 81.662331°W
- Owner: Jacksonville Transportation Authority
- Platforms: 1 island platform
- Tracks: 2
- Connections: Jacksonville Water Taxi; JTA Bus: 1, 3, 11, 18, 201 (Clay Express), 800 (Nassau Express), XS2 (St. Johns Express)

Construction
- Structure type: Elevated
- Accessible: Yes

History
- Opened: June 1989
- Rebuilt: 1996–1997

Services
Preceding station	Jacksonville Transportation Authority	Following station
Jefferson toward LaVilla	Skyway	James Weldon Johnson Park toward Rosa Parks
San Marco toward Kings Avenue	Skyway	Terminus
Location

Central station is a Skyway monorail station in Jacksonville, Florida. It is located on Bay Street between Pearl and Julia Streets in Downtown Jacksonville.

== History ==
The Central station was one of the three original Jacksonville Skyway stations that opened in June 1989. At the time it was the eastern terminus of the line, which ran west to Jefferson station and Terminal station (now LaVilla station). All three stations were closed between December 1996 and December 1997 when the Skyway system switched from Matra to Bombardier Transportation technology. It was designed as a transfer hub for subsequent extensions to the north and south, which were completed in 1997 and 1998, respectively. It allows transfer between trains heading east from Jefferson station and north from San Marco station. Additionally, the station was constructed to accommodate a future eastern expansion along Bay Street.

The next stations in the line are James Weldon Johnson Park station to the north, Jefferson station to the west, and San Marco station across the river to the south. Points of interest nearby include the Riverfront Plaza, the Northbank Riverwalk, the Times-Union Center for the Performing Arts, and many businesses.

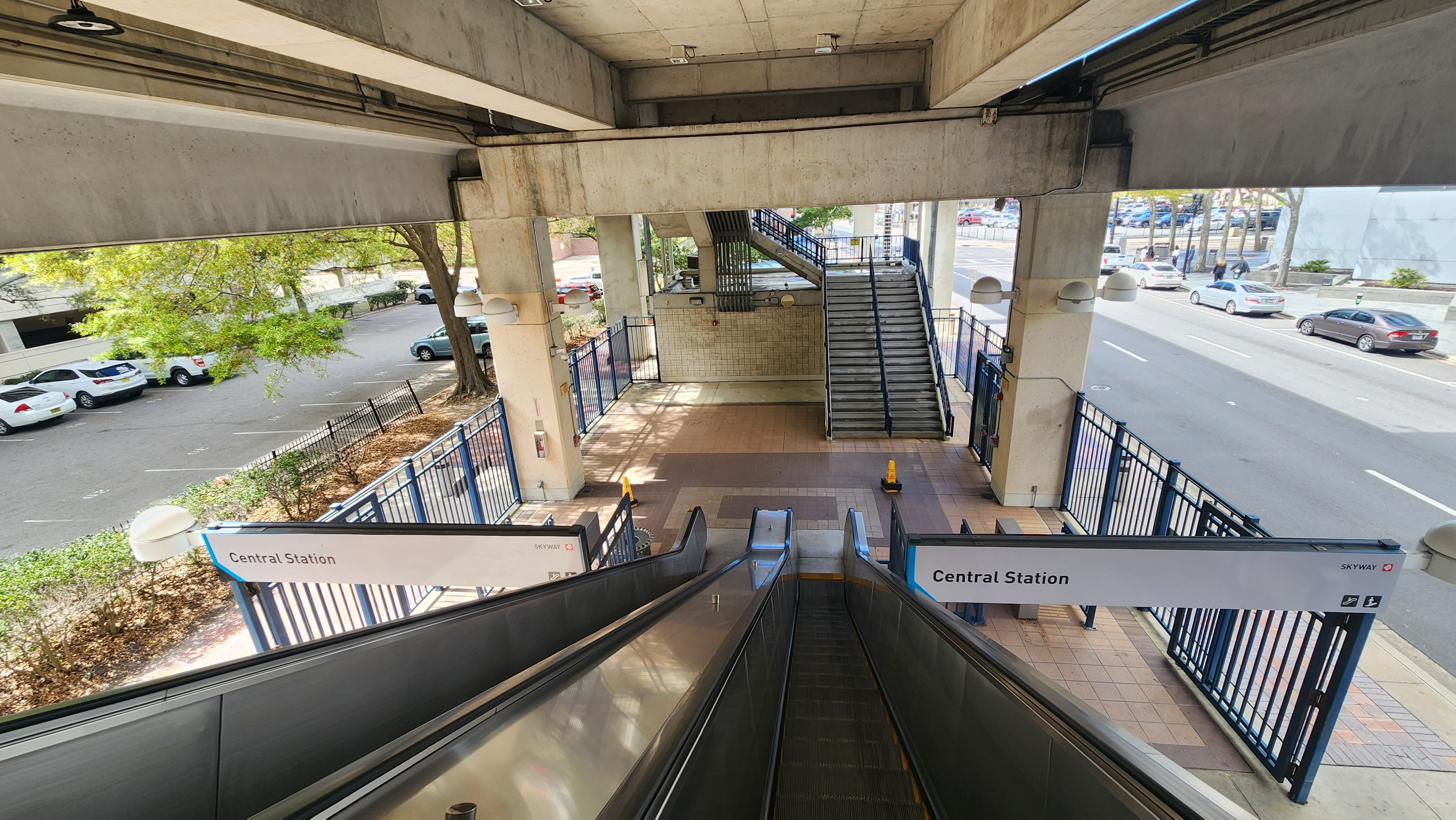
Station lobby
