= Acosta Bridge =

Bridge in Florida, United States of America

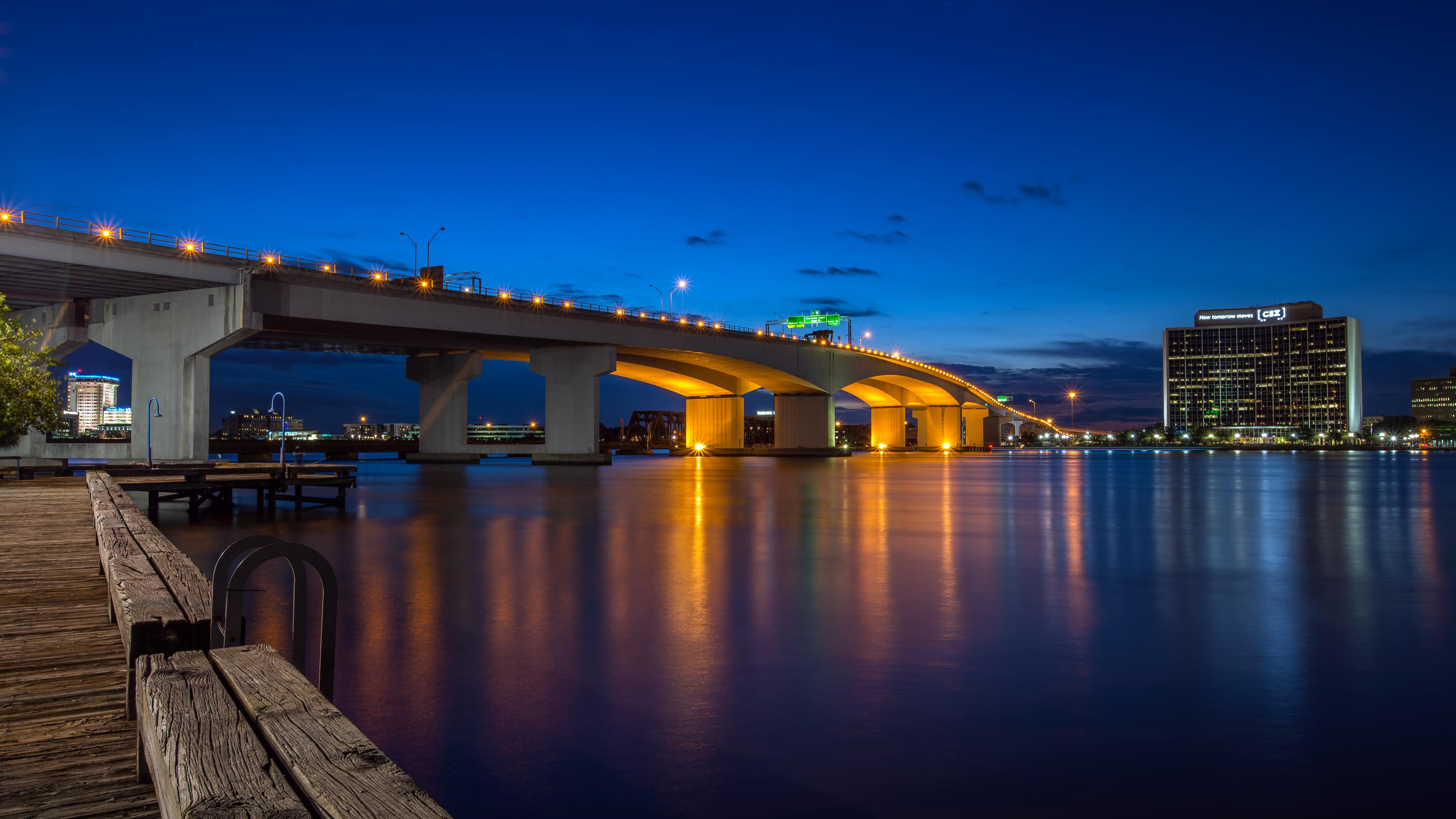
- Coordinates: 30°19′17″N 81°39′50″W
- Carries: 6 lanes of SR 13; 2 monorail tracks 2 sidewalks
- Crosses: St. Johns River
- Locale: Jacksonville, Florida
- Official name: St. Elmo W. Acosta Bridge
- Maintained by: Florida Department of Transportation
- ID number: 720570 southbound 720571 northbound

Characteristics
- Design: Continuous prestressed concrete segmental box girder bridge
- Total length: 1,645 feet (501 m)
- Width: 151.3 feet (46.1 m)
- Longest span: 630 feet (190 m)
- Clearance below: 81 feet (25 m)

History
- Construction start: 1990
- Opened: August 1994; 31 years ago

Location
- Interactive map of Acosta Bridge

St. Johns River Bridge
- The center span of the old Acosta Bridge in 1987 with the FEC Strauss Trunnion Bascule Bridge immediately behind and the old Fuller Warren Bridge in the distance.
- Coordinates: 30°19′17″N 81°39′50″W
- Carries: 3 lanes of SR 13
- Crosses: St. Johns River
- Locale: Jacksonville, Florida
- Official name: St. Elmo W. Acosta Bridge
- Other name: The Yellow Monster
- Maintained by: Florida Department of Transportation

Characteristics
- Design: Steel vertical-lift bridge
- Total length: 1,645 feet (501 m)
- Width: 75 feet (23 m)

History
- Opened: 1921
- Closed: 1991

Location
- Interactive map of St. Johns River Bridge

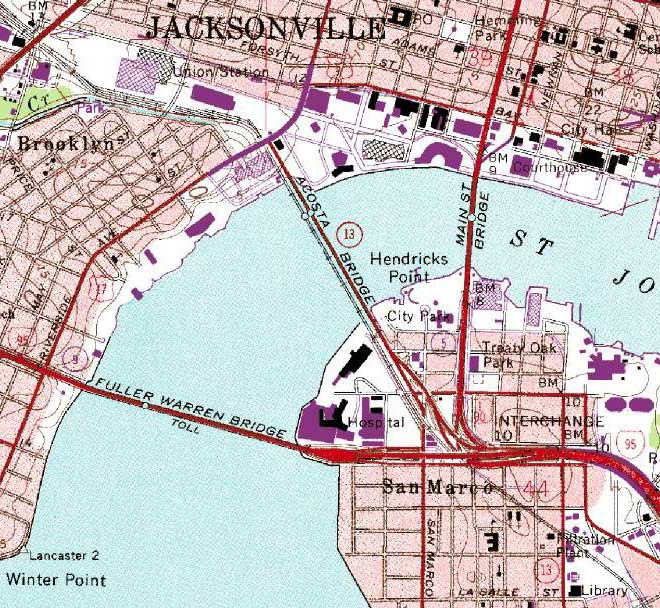
A 1992 map of the Acosta Bridge (the middle one), before its replacement.

The St. Elmo W. Acosta Bridge spans the St. Johns River in Jacksonville, Florida on a fixed span. It is named for City Councilman St. Elmo W. Acosta, who convinced voters to approve a $950,000 bond issue for the original bridge at the site. It carries a total of six lanes of SR 13 with the two-track Jacksonville Skyway in the median and sidewalks on the outside.

Prior to its replacement in 1991, the bridge, originally called St. Johns River Bridge, opened in 1921 and carried three lanes (center one reversible) on a lift bridge of similar design to the nearby Main Street Bridge but was known as the Yellow Monster, largely for its tendency to stick in the upward position. Tolls were charged until 1940, earning more than $4 million for the City of Jacksonville. At some time in 1991, the original bridge was closed to allow construction of the new one to proceed.

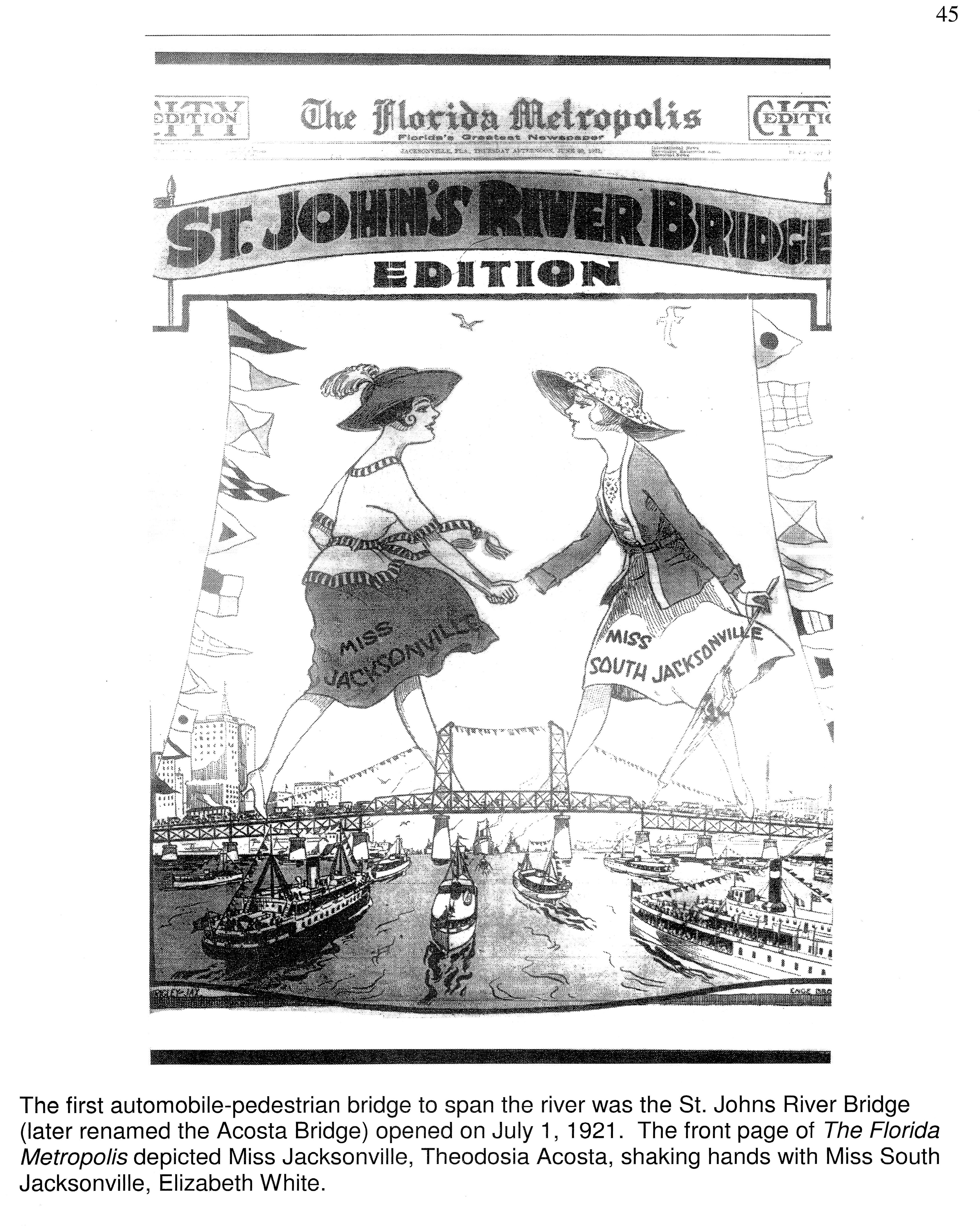
St Johns River Bridge Opened 21 July 1921. Miss Jacksonville, Theodosia Acosta shakes hands with Miss South Jacksonville Elizabeth White.

The Acosta Bridge was also notable due to its blue neon lights that illuminated the bridge at night. In February 2015 the Jacksonville Transportation Authority announced that the neon lights would "be off indefinitely with no return date on the books" citing a lack of funding for repairs. However, in 2019 the JTA began a $2.6 million project to replace the inoperable neon lights with LED lights. Installation was completed in 2020 and unlike the neon lights, the new LEDs are able to display any color, not just blue.

== North (downtown) approach ==
The original north approach was a T-shaped viaduct, with the bridge ending at Riverside Avenue (US 17/SR 15). Just southwest of the Acosta Bridge, Riverside Avenue passed over the adjacent Florida East Coast Railway bridge approach.

When the bridge was rebuilt, the intersection was rebuilt as a semi-directional T interchange. Direct high-speed connections were provided between the bridge and both directions on Riverside Avenue, as well as a direct ramp from the bridge to the intersection of Broad Street and Bay Street (Riverside Avenue splits into a one-way pair of Broad Street and Jefferson Street north of the bridge).

== South approach ==
The bridge originally emptied out on Miami Road (now Prudential Drive) just west of San Marco Boulevard, with a continuation, at least southbound, to San Marco Boulevard. SR 13 went south on San Marco Boulevard, and was later changed to go east on Miami Road.

Around 1958, a system of freeways was built in Jacksonville. This system included an eastern approach for the recently opened Fuller Warren Bridge, along with the older Acosta Bridge and Main Street Bridge, carrying traffic to the Philips Highway (U.S. Route 1 (SR 5)) and Atlantic Boulevard (US 90 (SR 10)). A new approach to the Acosta Bridge was built, splitting from the old one two blocks north of Miami Road, and passing over the intersection of Miami Road and San Marco Boulevard before merging with the other bridge approaches. The old approach became southbound only, and northbound access was provided at Mary Street, two blocks north of Miami Road. A northbound exit was also provided at Mary Street for traffic coming from the south and east. No southbound entrance was provided, but the adjacent Main Street Bridge approach provided access in that direction.

When the bridge was rebuilt, the south approach was kept almost identical. The only real difference was a new northbound onramp from Museum Circle, one block north of Mary Street. The popular Diamond Head Lobster House was in its path and had to be demolished.
