= Transportation in Jacksonville, Florida =

The Jacksonville transportation network includes ground, air, and sea options for passenger and freight transit. The Jacksonville Port Authority (Jaxport) operates the Port of Jacksonville, which includes container shipping facilities at Blount Island Marine Terminal, the Talleyrand Marine Terminal and the Dames Point Marine Terminal. Jacksonville Aviation Authority managers Jacksonville International Airport in Northside, as well as several smaller airports. The Jacksonville Transportation Authority (JTA) operates bus, people mover, and park-n-ride services throughout the city and region. A major bus terminal at the intermodal Rosa Parks Transit Station serves as JTA's main transit hub. Various intercity bus companies terminate near Central Station. Amtrak operates passenger rail service to and from major cities throughout North America. The city is bisected by major highways, I-95 and I-10, I-295 creates a full beltway around the city.

Along with bus services, Jacksonville offers fixed routes operated by the Jacksonville Transportation Authority (JTA). The Skyway is a people mover system located in Downtown Jacksonville. Its two lines and eight stations connect the Northbank, Southbank, and Lavilla districts. JTA is in the process of securing funding for an extension into Brooklyn, a neighborhood just south of Lavilla.

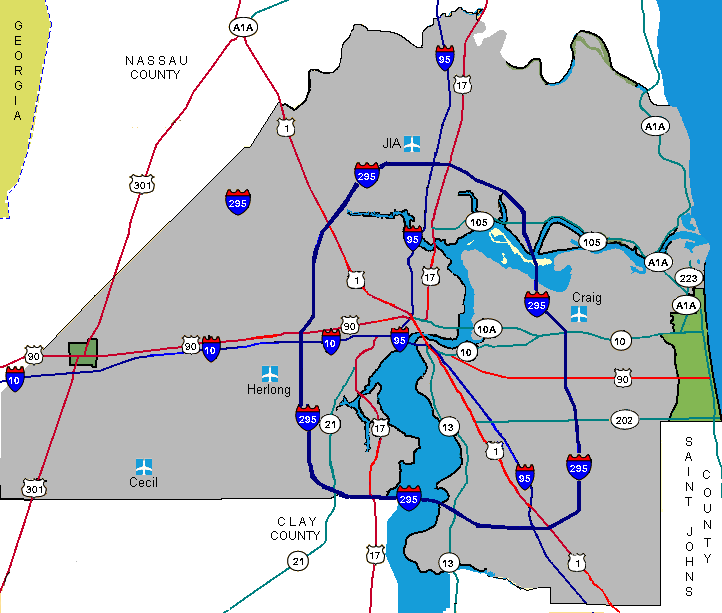
Highways and Airports in Jacksonville

== Background ==
Jacksonville is a sprawling city making cohesive walking and bicycling options difficult. Cycling still remains popular in some central urban areas for both recreation and commuting. The city manages to sustain a relatively low amount of traffic congestion for a city of its population, this is mostly related to the vast 767 square miles (1,990 km^{2}) area the city covers, an area much larger than most cities with a population over 800,000.

Jacksonville's low population density might also be the reason the city has yet to develop its mass transit bus system beyond the present routes or construct a heavy or light rail network. Among urbanized areas with a population of 1 million or greater in the United States, Jacksonville ranked tenth in freeway lane miles per 1,000 population and eighth in freeway-equivalent miles per 1,000 population. As the 12th-largest city in the U.S., Jacksonville has repeatedly been ranked below 40th in mass transit availability. As a result, the city is not well known for its walkability.

Jacksonville once had a large streetcar system. On February 24, 1893, Jacksonville began service with its first streetcar line. By the late 1920s, Jacksonville had what was Florida's largest streetcar system, run by multiple different companies. However, by the early 1930s, buses replaced streetcars, and the streetcars slowly perished. The last year of service was 1936.

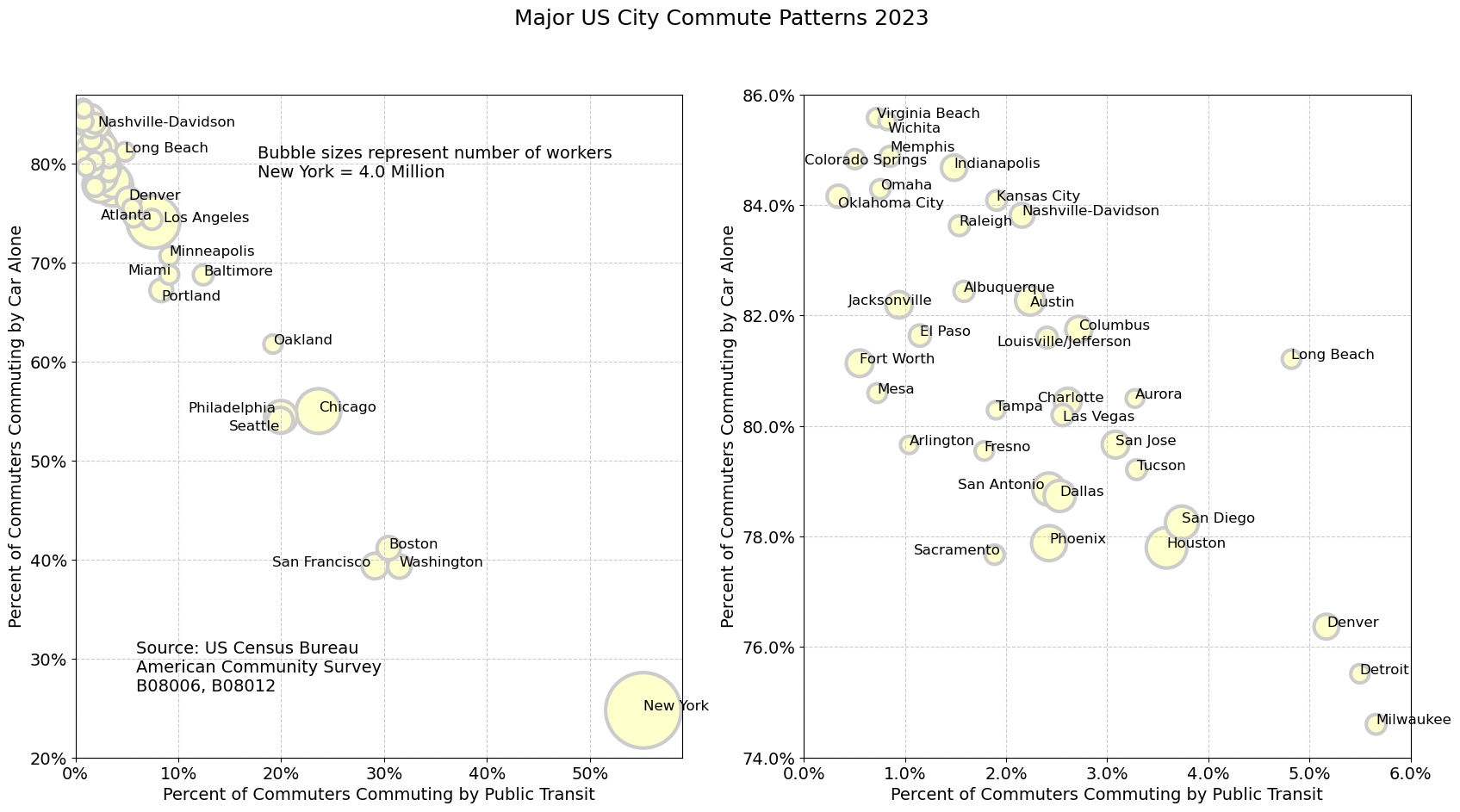
When compared to other U.S. cities, Jacksonville appears on the high end of car use, even amongst its car dependent peers in other Sunbelt regions.

Mobility issues include:

- Bus-only city mass transit system; the absence of rapid transit and light rail.
- Undue emphasis on automobile travel in city planning; the lack of sidewalks and bike paths.
- Excessive automobile usage resulting in environmental degradation (specifically air pollution), as evidenced by the city's history of poor air quality
- Lack of cross-town bus routes, forcing bus riders to travel downtown to cross from one side of the city to another, often doubling or tripling what the trip distance would have been with a direct route.
- "Lack of vision" in building a transportation network based entirely on non-renewable resources and old technology
- Paucity of scheduled bus routes, often forcing riders to choose between arriving at a destination extremely early, or late.
- Lack of night bus services, which forces those who work late shifts to find other ways to get around. These can be much more expensive.
- Fiscal costs of building (for instance liens), repairing, and replacing roads

There are other concerns over a lack of safe walking paths in many areas of the city. Many suburbs which were incorporated in the consolidation of 1968 don’t have sidewalks. This often forces pedestrians to navigate a narrow road shoulder near high-speed automobile traffic.

== Road transportation ==
=== Road infrastructure ===
Interstate highways:

- Interstate 10 routes west to Houston and Metropolitan Los Angeles.
- Interstate 95 routes north to Washington, D.C., and runs south to Miami.
- Interstate 295 serves as a beltway routing around the city and connects to all of the interstate highways.

Interstate Highways 10 and 95 intersect in Jacksonville, creating the busiest intersection in the region with 200,000 vehicles each day. Interstate 10 ends at this intersection (the other end being in Santa Monica, California).

A $152 million project to create a high-speed interchange at the intersection of Interstates 10 and 95 began in February 2005, after the conclusion of Super Bowl XXXIX. Construction was expected to take nearly six years with multiple lane flyovers and the requirement that the interchange remain open throughout the project. The previous configuration utilized single lane, low speed, curved ramps which created backups during rush hours and contributed to accidents.

Major arterial highways:

- US 1 The primary north-south local access roadway through downtown Jacksonville.
- US 17 Roosevelt Boulevard is a major north-south connector from downtown Jacksonville to Clay County.
- US 23 Kings Road, is another major north-south connector that terminates in downtown Jacksonville as Union Street going southeast and State Street going northwest. Most of the road is either multiplexed with US 1 or US 17.
- US 90 Beach Boulevard is a major east-west connector from downtown Jacksonville to the beaches.
- State Road 10 Atlantic Boulevard is the north connector to the beaches.
- State Road 23 The First Coast Expressway is a controlled-access toll road serving as an outer bypass around the southwest quadrant of Jacksonville.
- State Road 115 Southside Boulevard is a southeast residential connector; in north Jacksonville, it goes by many names but is a northwest residential connector.
- State Road 202 J. Turner Butler Boulevard is a major connector from Jacksonville to the beaches.
- State Road A1A Scenic two-lane road that runs along the Atlantic Ocean.

=== Buses ===
bicycle racks on buses

- Regular bus service – JTA's fleet has 180 vehicles that travel 8.5 million miles per year on 56 routes; 110 maintenance workers and 320 drivers are employed. Bicycle racks are now available on all city buses.
- Express bus service – Five once-daily early morning routes are offered which originate from an outlying area and go directly to their destination with no intermediate stops, then return in late afternoon.
- Trolley-replica buses – local transportation available weekdays from mid-morning to early afternoon; Bay Street and Beaver Street (downtown) routes are free; Riverside and the Beach trolley have a minimal charge.
- Stadium shuttle – game day bus transportation from suburban, downtown and Park-n-Ride locations to the stadium and back.
- JTA Connexion (paratransit) – special transport for the disabled and elderly, provided by private vendors with specially equipped vehicles and drivers.
- Greyhound Lines operates a bus station in downtown Jacksonville, near Skyway Central Station.

=== Parking ===
- Park-n-Ride – Parking facility available in combination with express bus service or Jacksonville Skyway.
- Many companies offer taxi service in Jacksonville. A cab can be hailed from the Jacksonville International Airport and most downtown locations, but elsewhere requires a phone call.

== Rail transportation ==
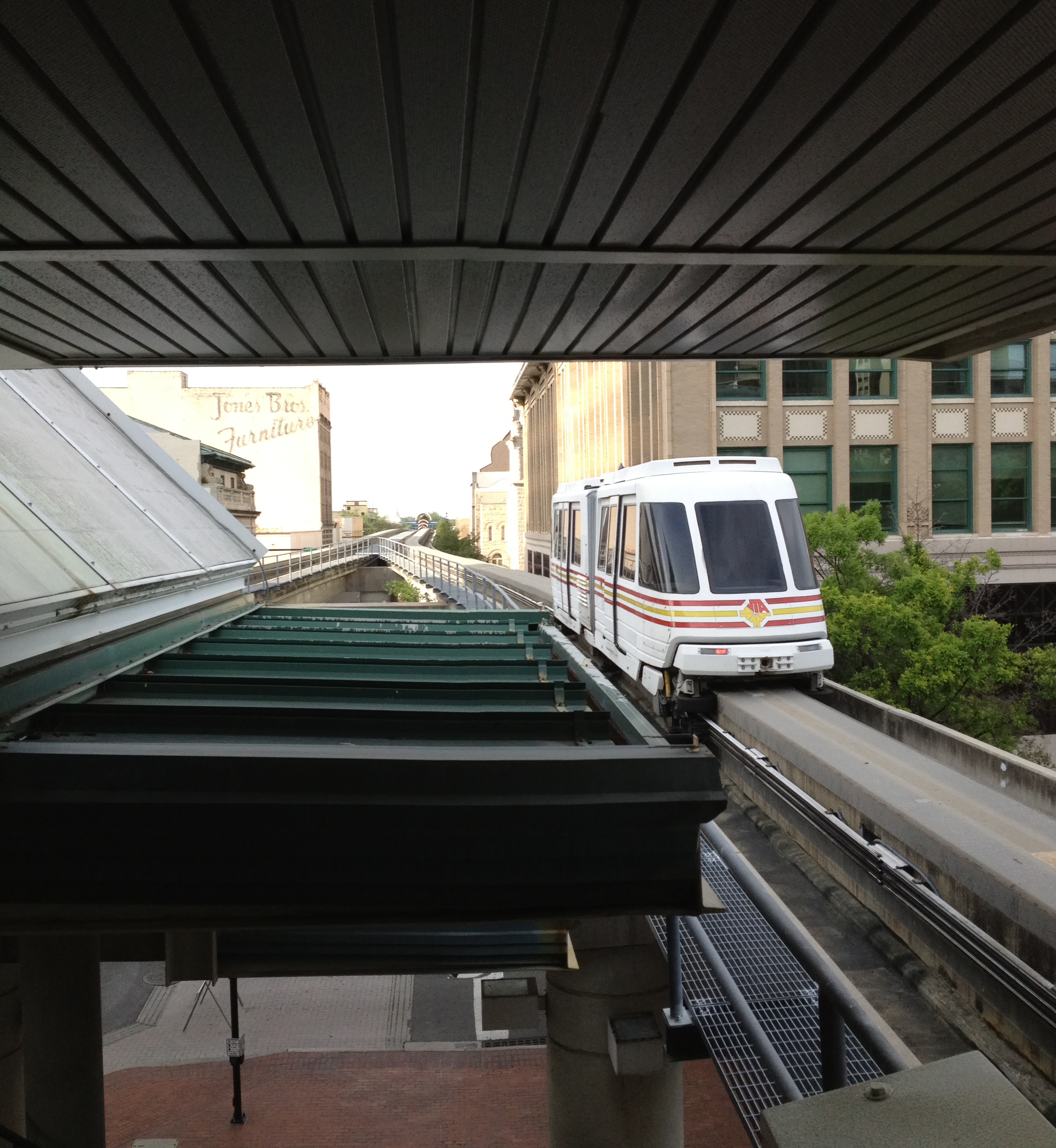
Jacksonville Skyway train

=== Monorail network ===
The Jacksonville Skyway is an automated people mover connecting Florida State College at Jacksonville downtown campus, the Northbank central business district, Convention Center, and Southbank locations. The system includes 8 stops connected by two lines. The existing train is a UMIII monorail built by Bombardier. The guideway consists of concrete beams which rest atop an unusually large support structure not used in most monorail systems. Maximum speed for the train is 48 km/h (30 mph).

A monorail was first proposed in the 1970s as part of a mobility plan hoping to attract interest from the Urban Mass Transit Administration's Downtown Peoplemover Program. The initial study was undertaken by the Florida Department of Transportation and Jacksonville's planning department, who took the Skyway project to the Jacksonville Transportation Authority (JTA) in 1977. Following further development and a final 18-month feasibility study, the UMTA selected Jacksonville as one of seven cities to receive federal funding for an automated people mover. Two other related projects are Miami's Metromover and Detroit People Mover. UMTA's approved plan called for the construction of a 2.5-mile (4.0 km) Phase I system to be built in three segments.

=== Intercity rail ===
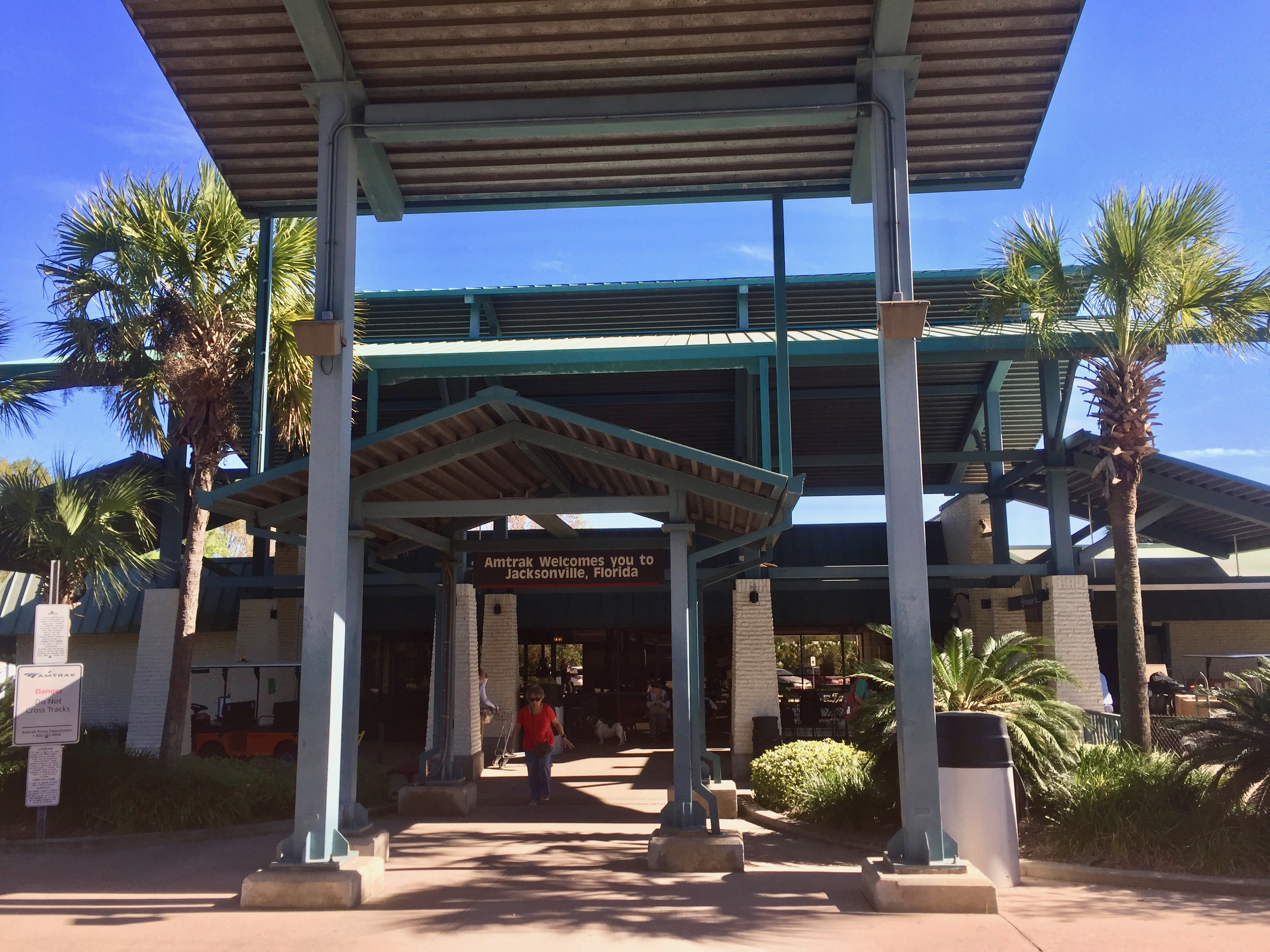
Jacksonville Amtrak station entrance

Amtrak, the national passenger rail system, provides daily service from the Jacksonville Amtrak Station on Clifford Lane in the northwest section of the city. Two trains presently stop there, the Silver Meteor and Floridian. Jacksonville was also served by the thrice-weekly Sunset Limited and the daily Silver Palm. Service on the Silver Palm was cut back to Savannah, Georgia in 2002, and renamed to the Palmetto. The Sunset Limited route was truncated at San Antonio, Texas as a result of the track damage in the Gulf Coast area caused by Hurricane Katrina on August 28, 2005. Service was restored as far east as New Orleans by late October 2005, but Amtrak currently has service suspended between Mobile and Orlando. . The FLoridan and silver meteor stop here.

=== Freight rail ===
Jacksonville is the headquarters of two significant freight railroads. CSX Transportation, owns a large building on the downtown riverbank that is a significant part of the skyline. Florida East Coast Railway also calls Jacksonville home.

Norfolk Southern Railway is another freight railroad serving Jacksonville. Mainly transporting intermodal containers for points south into Florida

== Aviation ==
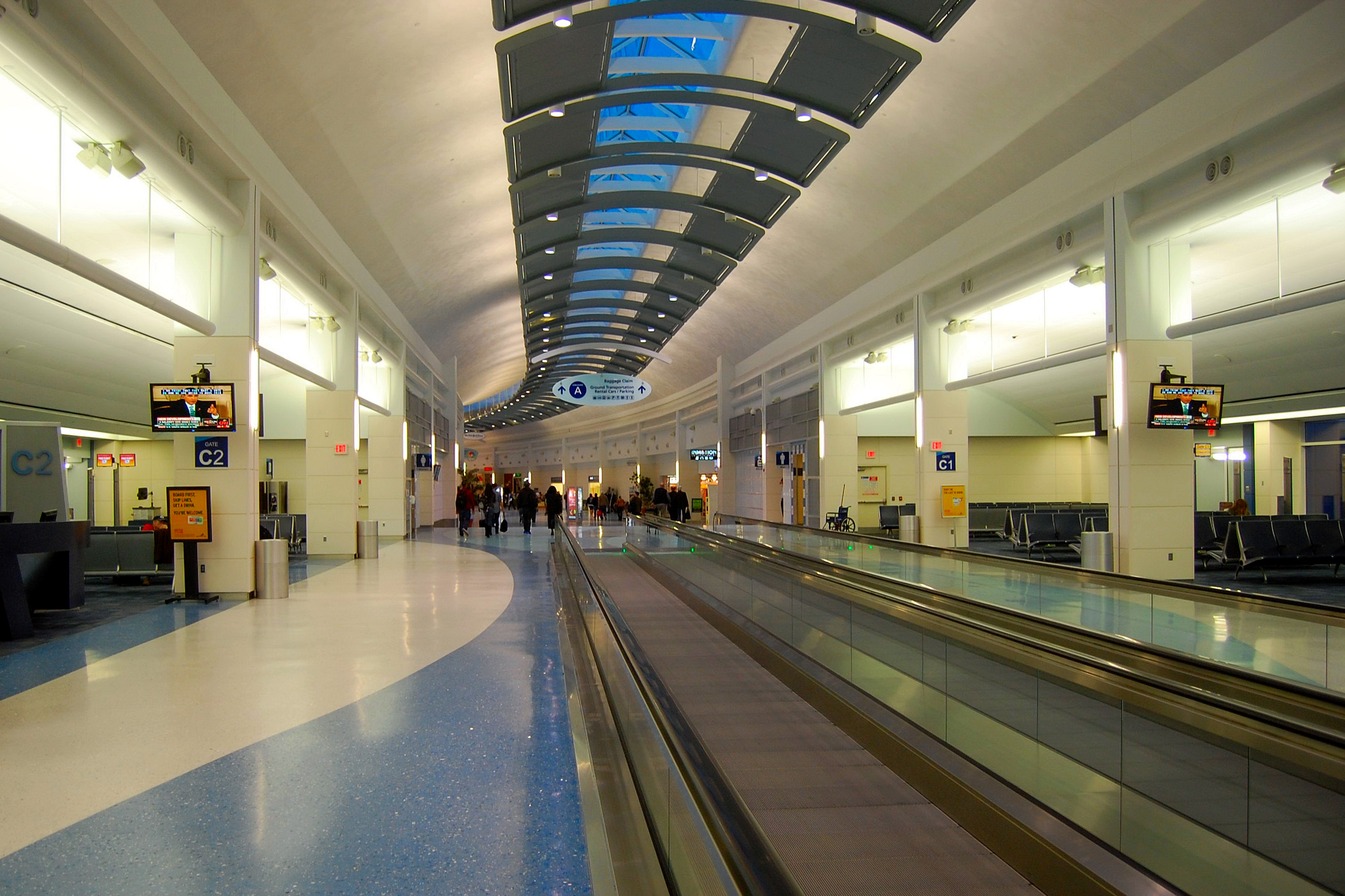
Jacksonville International Airport Concourse C

=== Jacksonville Aviation Authority airports ===
Jacksonville International Airport (JIA) is identified as IATA airport code JAX and as of 2025 is the seventh busiest airport in Florida handling nearly 7.5 million passengers annually. It serves the Greater Jacksonville Metropolitan Area, Northeast Florida and Southeast Georgia. The airport is currently served by nearly all major US airlines (Allegiant, American, Breeze, Delta, Frontier, JetBlue, Southwest, and United) and 13 commuter airlines. Several air service companies utilize JIA including FedEx, DHL Express and UPS. The airport is served by taxis, dedicated JTA bus routes, as well as several shuttle bus services available 24 hours a day. It also has a rental car center and sevaral parking garages.

In 2006, construction began to replace the three existing passenger concourses. Concourse A was demolished and rebuilt, followed by Concourse C, which was completed in 2008. Concourse B was a low priority because the capacities of Concourses A & C were more than adequate for existing demand. The Late-2000s recession resulted in a significant decrease in passengers and flights, which prompted the Jacksonville Aviation Authority to demolish Concourse B in June 2009 because it was safer and easier for the contractor. Construction on a rebuilt concourse B began in 2024 and is scheduled for completion in January 2027.

There are several minor airports operated by the Jacksonville Aviation Authority. These include:

- Craig Municipal Airport in Arlington, located about 8 miles from Downtown Jacksonville. Craig is a general aviation airport for business and personal aircraft as well as small commuter planes. The airport has a control tower and handles 400-500 aircraft operations daily.
- Cecil Field, in Westside, is a civil-military airport at Cecil Commerce Center that services military aircraft, corporate aircraft, general aviation, and air cargo. The Florida Army National Guard's primary Aviation Support Facility and the United States Coast Guard's Helicopter Interdiction Tactical Squadron (HITRON) are also located there.
- Herlong Airport in Westside, is a general aviation airport used primarily for personal aircraft, including ultralights and gliders. JAA is the Fixed-base operator in the absence of a control tower.

=== Other Northeast Florida airports and airfields ===
Name	IATA Airport Code	ICAO Airport Code	Location
Northeast Florida Regional Airport	UST	KSGJ	St. Augustine, Florida
Keystone Heights Airport	(none)	(none)	Keystone Heights, Florida
Palatka Municipal Airport	(none)	(none)	Palatka, Florida
Fernandina Beach Municipal Airport	(none)	KFHB	Fernandina Beach, Florida

== Water transportation ==
=== Port of Jacksonville ===
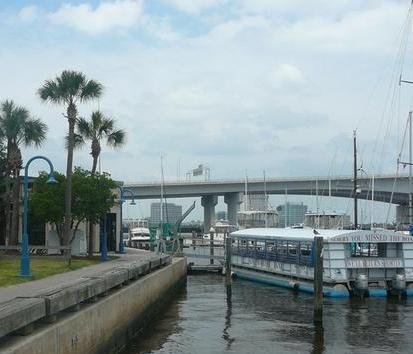
Water Taxi docked at Southbank

Public seaports in Jacksonville are managed by the Jacksonville Port Authority, known as JAXPORT. Imported and exported goods are shipped from well over 100 countries through the Port of Jacksonville. JAXPORT operates three main cargo facilities: the Blount Island Marine Terminal, the Talleyrand Marine Terminal and the Dames Point Marine Terminal. Through these terminals over 21 million tons of cargo is shipped each year. Port activity is estimated to have an annual impact of over $19 billion, including 65,000 jobs.

The Port of Jacksonville also serves as a hub for passenger ships. The JAXPORT Cruise Terminal is a 63,000 sq ft (5,900 m^{2}) cruise ship terminal located at the northwest corner of the Dames Point Marine Terminal, beside the Dames Point Bridge. Vehicle access to the site is via Hecksher Drive and there is paved parking for about 600 cars. Sailings commenced in October 2003 and Carnival Cruise Lines presently offers service aboard the Fasciantion with service to the Bahamas and Key West.

=== Passenger boat services ===
- Jacksonville Water Taxi operates water taxis across the St. Johns River, with stops along the Jacksonville Riverwalks.
- The Mayport Ferry has been operating since 1948 and is the last active ferry in Florida. It connects State Road A1A between Mayport and Fort George Island.

== Future and proposed projects ==
Several proposals for expanding the Jacksonville transit system are in various stages of discussion, planning, or initial funding.

- In 2010, Cecil Field became the United States' eighth licensed commercial spaceport and the first in Florida authorized to fly space vehicles that take off and land horizontally.
- The First Coast Commuter Rail is a proposed commuter rail system serving Jacksonville, FL and Northeast Florida. It is currently in the very early planning stages, having completed the first step of a feasibility study and currently pursuing an alternatives analysis. Three routes were analyzed indepth, north to Yulee, FL, southwest to Green Cove Springs, FL and the southeast to St. Augustine, FL.
- Brightline, an inter-city passenger rail service, currently owns passenger trackage rights along the entire Florida East Coast Railway corridor, making the prospect of an expansion of Brightline to Jacksonville much simpler due to some of the existing rail infrastructure already in place.
- JTA is applying for grants to extend the Jacksonville Skyway into a new station located next to the operations and maintenance center in Jacksonville's fast-growing Brooklyn neighborhood.

== See also ==
- Jacksonville Transportation Authority
- Jacksonville Aviation Authority
- Northeast Florida Regional Transportation Commission
- Plug-in electric vehicles in Florida § Jacksonville
