= Naval Air Station Cecil Field =

1942–1999 naval air base in Duval County, Florida, USA

- Jacksonville, Florida in the United States
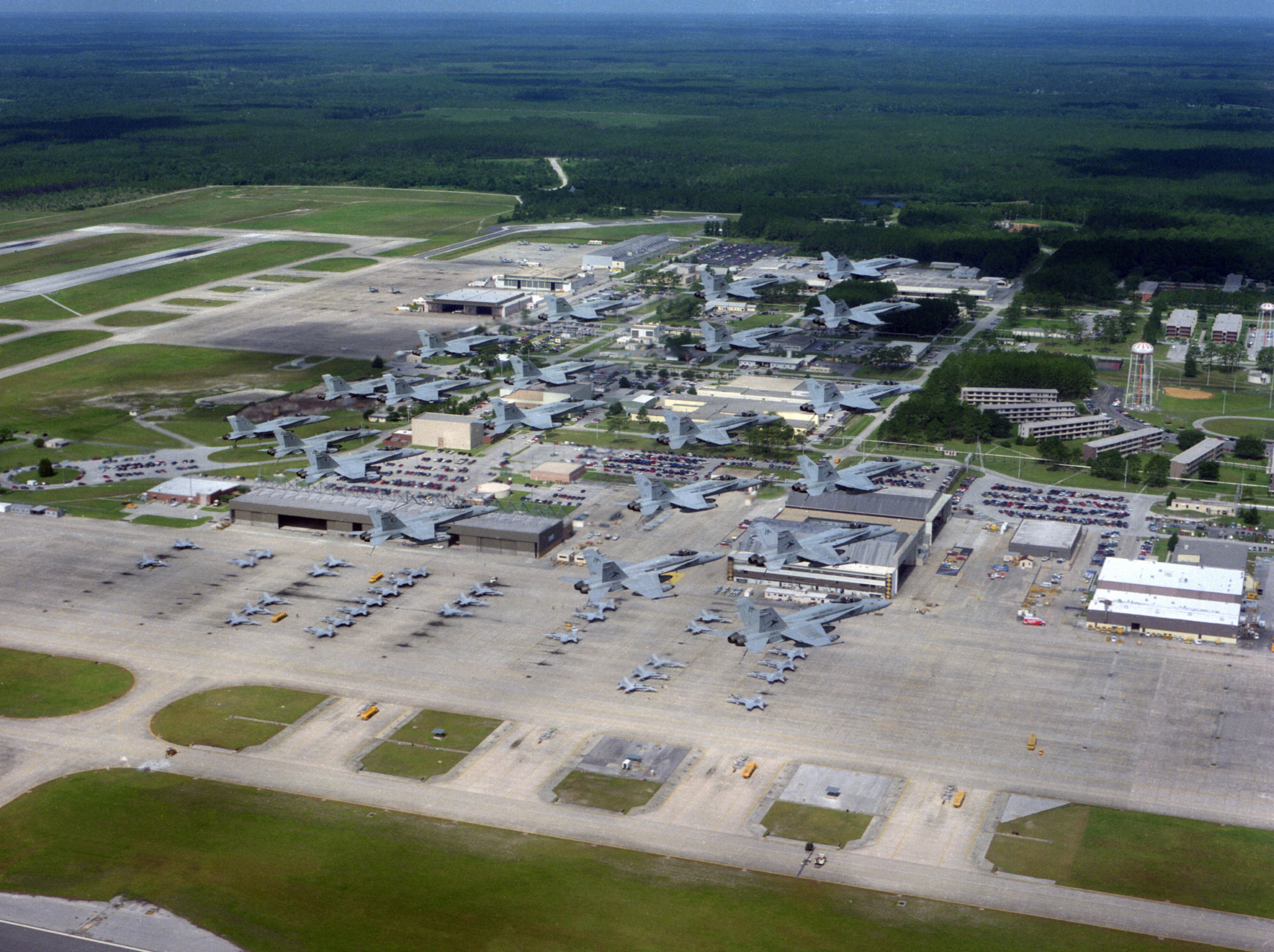
- F/A-18 Hornets from Carrier Air Wing Seventeen returning to NAS Cecil Field in 1994

Site information
- Type: Naval Air Station
- Owner: Department of Defense
- Operator: US Navy
- Condition: Closed

Location
- Location in the United States
- Coordinates: 30°13′07″N 081°52′36″W

Site history
- Built: 1941
- In use: 1941 – 1999
- Fate: Transferred to civilian use and became Cecil Airport (also used by Florida Army National Guard) and Cecil Commerce Center

Airfield information
- Identifiers: IATA: NZC, ICAO: KNZC, FAA LID: NZC, WMO: 722067
- Elevation: 25 metres (82 ft) AMSL
Runways
Direction	Length and surface
18L/36R	3,811 metres (12,503 ft) asphalt/concrete
18R/36L	2,439 metres (8,002 ft) asphalt/concrete
9L/27R	2,439 metres (8,002 ft) asphalt/concrete
9R/27L	2,439 metres (8,002 ft) asphalt/concrete

Naval Air Station Cecil Field or NAS Cecil Field (IATA: NZC, ICAO: KNZC, FAA LID: NZC) was a United States Navy air base, located in Duval County, Florida. Prior to October 1999, NAS Cecil Field was the largest military base in terms of acreage in the Jacksonville, Florida area.

NAS Cecil Field consisted of four separate facilities, the NAS Cecil Field Complex (Cecil Field), Outlying Field Whitehouse (OLF Whitehouse), the Yellow Water Weapons Department and the Pinecastle [Pine Castle] Electronic Warfare Target Area / Warfare Range. Including nearly 2,500 acres (10 km^{2}) at OLF Whitehouse, the NAS Cecil Field complex consisted of 22,939 acres (92.83 km^{2}); in addition, the base leased another 8,379 acres (33.91 km^{2}). By late 1999, approximately 17,200 acres (70 km^{2}) were transferred to the civilian sector in the form of the Jacksonville Aviation Authority, while the remainder was transferred to Naval Air Station Jacksonville.

As directed by the Base Realignment and Closure Commission (BRAC) and the U.S. Congress pursuant to BRAC 1993 and BRAC 1995, NAS Cecil Field was decommissioned as an active naval installation on 30 September 1999. It is now a civilian, public-use, joint civil-military airfield and industrial park known as Cecil Commerce Center and Cecil Airport.

== History ==
NAS Cecil Field was named in honor of Commander Henry Barton Cecil, USN, who died in 1933 in the crash of the Navy airship USS Akron. Shortly before the United States' entry into World War II, a 2,600-acre (11 km^{2}) tract of land was purchased in western Duval County and construction began on the "U.S. Naval Auxiliary Air Station, Cecil Field" (NAAS Cecil Field).

=== 1940s ===
The base got its start in June 1941 as an outlying field of NAS Jacksonville, and operations were accelerated just 11 days after the Japanese Attack on Pearl Harbor. Carrier-based fighter (VF) and scout bombing (VSB) units of Advanced Carrier Group, Atlantic arrived at Cecil Field in late 1942 to commence replacement pilot combat training and Cecil Field was commissioned as a Naval Auxiliary Air Station (NAAS) in February 1943.

In March 1943, the fighter training unit moved to nearby Naval Auxiliary Air Station Lee Field in Green Cove Springs, and NAAS Cecil Field became the principal war-at-sea and dive-bombing training center for the U.S. Navy and U.S. Marine Corps. From 1943 until the war ended, NAAS Cecil Field was a pilot's last stop before assignment to combat in either the Atlantic Fleet or Pacific Fleet. It operated at full capacity during the war years and after the war.

=== 1950s ===
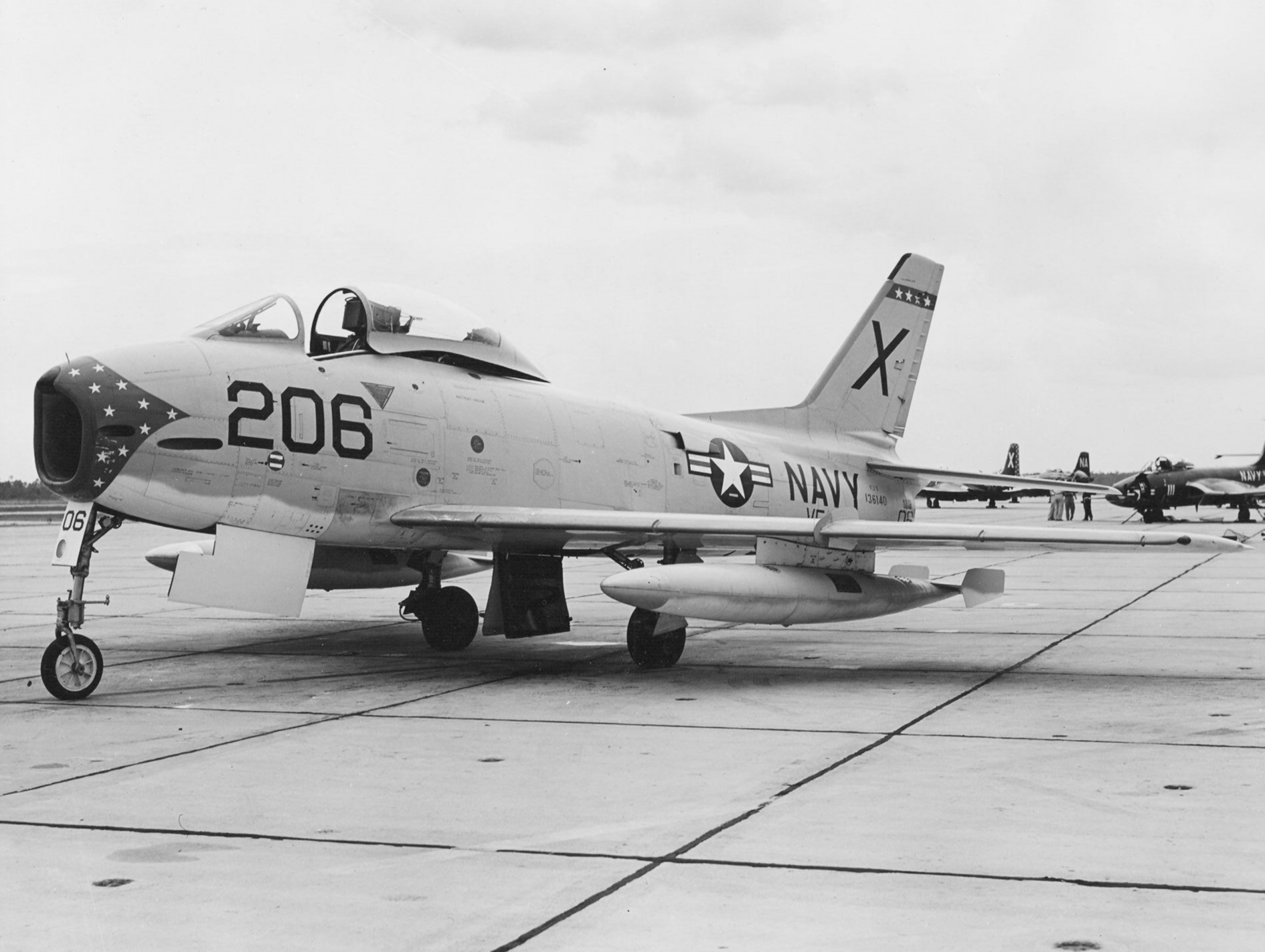
An FJ-3 from VF-62 at NAS Cecil Field, 1956

Disestablished as NAAS Cecil Field at the end of World War II, it was then re-established and disestablished until finally redesignated as a Naval Air Station Cecil Field on 30 June 1952. The station was rejuvenated as an operating base for fleet aircraft squadrons and air groups, ushering in the "jet age" for Naval Aviation in the Jacksonville area.

In the mid-1950s, NAS Cecil Field's growth was given further impetus when the station was selected to serve as one of four naval air stations to be designated as Master Jet Bases specifically used for the operation of carrier-based jet aircraft. In 1951, the land area of NAS Cecil Field was increased to 4,600 acres (19 km^{2}) and additional new buildings and facilities were constructed. Naval Air Station Cecil Field occupied 19,664 acres (79.58 km^{2}), and was projected to be Navy's largest Master Jet Base.

=== 1960s ===
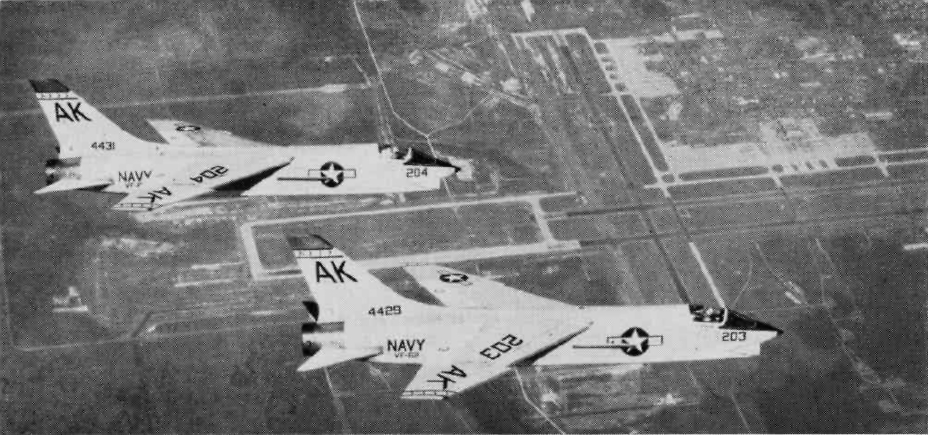
Two F8U-1s of VF-62 over NAS Cecil Field, 1962

It was RF-8 Crusaders from Light Photographic Squadron SIX TWO (VFP-62) out of NAS Cecil Field (along with Marine Aviators from Marine Photographic Squadron TWO (VMAQ-2|VMCJ-2), based at MCAS Cherry Point, NC and flying the same aircraft) which, in coordination with U.S. Air Force U-2 and RF-101 aircraft, detected the presence of nuclear-armed intermediate range ballistic missiles in Cuba and monitored the associated Soviet buildup during the Cuban Missile Crisis of October 1962.

=== 1990s: Base realignment and closure ===
Naval Air Station Cecil Field was identified for closure, and enacted, by the 1993 federal Base Realignment and Closure Commission (BRAC). Upon notice, by the BRAC, the city of Jacksonville initiated the development of a reuse plan to guide transition of base property and facilities to other uses that support local goals for economic and community development. There have been efforts to see the base returned as a Naval Air Station (NAS), but these have failed due to political and economic forces.

== Aircraft assigned (1960–1999) ==
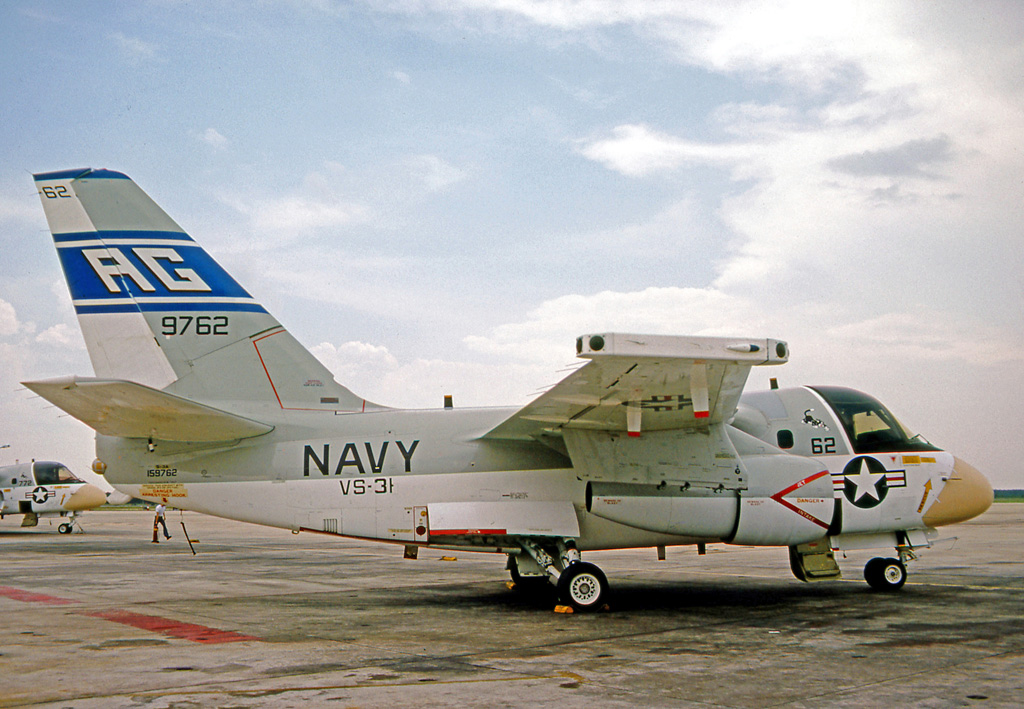
Lockheed S-3A Viking of VS-31 at NAS Cecil Field in 1976

- F3H Demon
- A-3 Skywarrior
- F8U Crusader and RF-8 Crusader
- F-4 Phantom II
- A-4 Skyhawk
- A-7 Corsair II
- S-3 Viking
- F/A-18 Hornet
- ES-3 Shadow
- C-1A Trader AIR OPS NAS CECIL
- US-2B Tracker AIR OPS NAS CECIL FIELD
- T-28 Trojan AIR OPS NAS CECIL FIELD
- C-12 Huron AIR OPS NAS CECIL FIELD

== Commands ==
Numerous commands operated from NAS Cecil Field over its lifetime.

The first weather observations were recorded at NAS Cecil Field in May 1949, with the first meteorological equipment installed in December of the same year. In those days, weather observing and forecasting services were provided by the Meteorology Division of the Air Operations Department. The "weather guessers" of Cecil Field first became a detachment, as Naval Weather Service Environmental Detachment (NWSED), Cecil Field when, in an effort to centralize control of support from the Navy's shore-based meteorological units, the CNO established the Office of the Naval Weather Service on 29 December 1965. In September 1979, almost 14 years later, the name changed to Naval Oceanography Command Detachment (NOCD), Cecil Field.

Squadrons from NAS Cecil Field were aboard every Atlantic Fleet aircraft carrier deployed to Southeast Asia during the Vietnam War. During this period, thirteen NAS Cecil Field pilots were listed as POW or MIA. The POW/MIA memorial located behind the base chapel has become the chosen site for many retiring officers and enlisted personnel to hold their retirement ceremonies.

The first Atlantic Fleet Squadrons to fly the A-7 Corsair II, the F/A-18 Hornet, the S-3A and S-3B Viking, and the ES-3A Shadow were all based at NAS Cecil Field.

NAS Cecil Field squadrons again made history during the Gulf War, marking the final combat deployment for the A-7E Corsair II and the first combat operations for the S-3B Viking.

During the 1980s and 1990s, in addition to the station leadership of NAS Cecil Field, the principal tenant commands were:

- Commander, Light Attack Wing ONE / renamed Commander, Strike Fighter Wing Atlantic (December 1992)
  - Attack Squadron 12 (VA-12) decommissioned as an A-7 Corsair II Light Attack Squadron
  - Strike Fighter Squadron 15 (VFA-15)
  - Strike Fighter Squadron 37 (VFA-37)
  - Attack Squadron 46 (VA-46) (disestablished as an A-7 Corsair II light attack squadron, June 1991)
  - Attack Squadron 66 (VA-66) (disestablished as an A-7 Corsair II light attack squadron, Mar 1987)
  - Attack Squadron 72 (VA-72) (disestablished as an A-7 Corsair II light attack squadron, June 1991)
  - Strike Fighter Squadron 81 (VFA-81)
  - Strike Fighter Squadron 82 (VFA-82)
  - Strike Fighter Squadron 83 (VFA-83)
  - Strike Fighter Squadron 86 (VFA-86)
  - Strike Fighter Squadron 87 (VFA-87)
  - Strike Fighter Squadron 105 (VFA-105)
  - Strike Fighter Squadron 106 VFA-106 (F/A-18 Hornet Fleet Replacement Squadron)
  - Strike Fighter Squadron 131 VFA-131
  - Strike Fighter Squadron 132 VFA-132 (disestablished as an F/A-18 Hornet strike fighter squadron, June 1992)
  - Strike Fighter Squadron 136 (VFA-136)
  - Strike Fighter Squadron 137 (VFA-137)
  - Attack Squadron 174 (VA-174) {disestablished as an A-7 Corsair II light attack squadron/A-7 Fleet Replacement Squadron, June 1988}
  - Strike Fighter Weapons School, Atlantic
- Commander, Air Antisubmarine Wing ONE / renamed Commander, Sea Strike Wing ONE (May 1987) / renamed Commander, Sea Control Wing Atlantic (October 1992)
  - Sea Control Squadron 22 (VS-22)
  - Sea Control Squadron 24 (VS-24)
  - Sea Control Squadron 27 (VS-27) {disestablished as an S-3 Viking sea control squadron/S-3 Fleet Replacement Squadron, September 1994}
  - Sea Control Squadron 28 (VS-28)
  - Sea Control Squadron 30 (VS-30)
  - Sea Control Squadron 31 (VS-31)
  - Sea Control Squadron 32 (VS-32)
  - Fleet Air Reconnaissance Squadron 6 (VQ-6)
- Commander, Carrier Air Wing THREE (CVW-3)
- Commander, Carrier Air Wing SIX (CVW-6) {disestablished as a carrier air wing, April 1993}
- Commander, Carrier Air Wing SEVENTEEN (CVW-17)
- Commander, Carrier Air Wing Reserve TWENTY (CVWR-20)
  - Strike Fighter Squadron 203 (VFA-203); based at NAS Cecil Field
  - Marine Fighter Attack Squadron 142 (VMFA-142); based at NAS Cecil Field
  - other CVWR-20 squadrons based at NAS Atlanta, NAS Dallas (later NAS JRB Fort Worth), NAS New Orleans, NAS Norfolk and NAF Washington
- Commanding Officer, Marine Aviation Training Support Group (MATSG) Cecil Field
- Naval Air Reserve Jacksonville, Detachment NAS Cecil Field
- Naval Branch Medical Clinic, Cecil Field
- Naval Air Maintenance Training Detachment
- Naval Meteorology and Oceanography Command Detachment, NAS Cecil Field
- Aviation Physiology Training Unit (APTU), NAS Cecil Field
- Marine Security Force Company, Yellow Water Weapons, NAS Cecil Field
- Marine Aircraft Group 42 (MAG-42), Detachment A

== Current military operations ==
A continuing military presence at what is now Cecil Airport and Cecil Commerce Center remains with Army Aviation Support Facility No. 1 (AASF #1) of the Florida Army National Guard (FLARNG), which relocated its flight operations from nearby Craig Airport in late 1999. The FLARNG operates CH-47 Chinook, UH-60 Blackhawk, UH-72 Lakota and C-12 Huron aircraft from AASF No. 1 at Cecil Field. Also located at Cecil Field is Coast Guard Air Facility Jacksonville, which supports the U.S. Coast Guard's Helicopter Interdiction Tactical Squadron (HITRON) and its MH-65C Dolphin helicopters. The airfield is also extensively used for practice approaches and touch-and-go landings by military aircraft based at NAS Jacksonville, Naval Station Mayport and Jacksonville Air National Guard Base at Jacksonville International Airport, as well as itinerant military aircraft, especially those undergoing modification or repair work at former military aircraft maintenance facilities at Cecil Field now operated by The Boeing Company and Northrop Grumman.
