= VA72 =

VA-72 has the following meanings:

- VA-72 (U.S. Navy)
- State Route 72 (Virginia)
