= VFA-37 =

United States military unit

Strike Fighter Squadron 37
- Founded: 1 July 1967; 59 years ago
- Country: United States
- Branch: United States Navy
- Type: Fighter/Attack
- Role: Close air support Air interdiction Aerial reconnaissance
- Part of: Carrier Air Wing One
- Garrison/HQ: NAS Oceana
- Nickname: Ragin Bulls
- Engagements: Vietnam War; Operation Earnest Will; Operation Desert Shield; Operation Southern Watch; Operation Deliberate Guard; Operation Deliberate Force; Operation Desert Fox; Iraq War; Operation Enduring Freedom; Operation Inherent Resolve; Operation Southern Spear; Operation Epic Fury

Commanders
- Current commander: CDR Richard LeFils

Aircraft flown
- Attack: A-7 Corsair II
- Fighter: F/A-18C Hornet; F/A-18E Super Hornet

Strike Fighter Squadron 37 (VFA-37), also known as the "Ragin' Bulls", is a United States Navy F/A-18E Super Hornet fighter squadron stationed at Naval Air Station Oceana. They are a part of Carrier Air Wing 1 (CVW-1). Their radio callsign is Ragin' and their tail code is AB.

== Squadron insignia and nickname ==
The squadron's initial insignia was approved by CNO on 26 March 1968. The design centered on a bull was selected to symbolize the spirit, pride and mission of the unit. The original insignia was designed and drawn in house after suggestions from VA-37's first Commanding Officer - Cdr Burnett. The design drawn by the squadrons Maintenance Office AZ3 L.A. Smith. Little was changed from submission to CNO approval. The Bulls current insignia was based on the Schlitz Malt Liquor logo. Over the years, the size of the testicles has been changed several times. After the Tailhook scandal, the testicles were removed completely from the logo for a time.

== History ==
=== 1960s ===
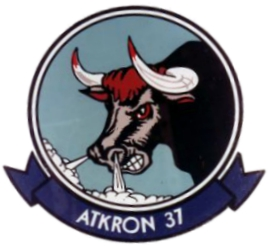
Early insignia

VA-37 was established as an A-7 Corsair II squadron on 1 July 1966. After training with VA-174 in the operation of the A-7 from July–November 1967, VA-37 became operational in 1967, deploying aboard USS Kitty Hawk.

=== 1970s ===
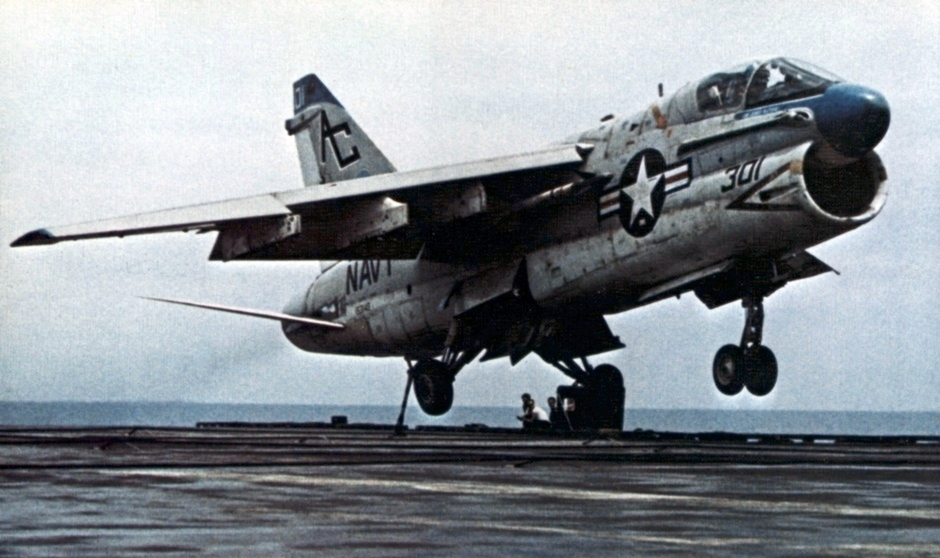
VA-37 A-7A landing aboard USS Saratoga off Vietnam, in 1972

In September 1970, VA-37 was embarked on USS Saratoga when fighting erupted between Palestinian forces and the Jordanian Army, and was directed to operate in the eastern Mediterranean in response to this crisis. On 29 September 1970, VA-37 participated in an air power demonstration for President Richard Nixon during his two-day visit to USS Saratoga while she steamed in the Mediterranean. From June to October 1971, VA-37 participated in the test and evaluation of the new CV concept during USS Saratoga's deployment to the North Atlantic and the Mediterranean Sea. The CV concept involved combining the capabilities of the attack and antisubmarine carriers (CVA and CVS) into a single ship.

The squadron deployed twice to Yankee Station in support of combat operations during the Vietnam War. On 1 August 1972, a squadron A-7A was used to establish a sonobuoy field in an anchorage area near the island of Hon Nieu, off the coast of North Vietnam - the first time an A-7 had ever been used to drop sonobuoys.

In 1973, the squadron received their first A-7E, a more advanced version of the plane. They made seven cruises with this plane in the 1970s and early 1980s, including responding to regional crises in the Mediterranean Sea and Indian Ocean.

=== 1980s ===
On 4 January USS John F. Kennedy, with VA-37 embarked as part of Carrier Air Wing Three, deployed from Naval Station Norfolk, Virginia for a seven-month cruise that saw USS John F. Kennedy sail to the Arabian Sea via the Mediterranean Sea and Suez Canal. During this time port visits took place in St. Thomas, US Virgin Islands, and Malaga, Spain. During their time operating in the Arabian Sea, VA-37 and USS John F. Kennedy conducted port visits at Perth, Australia and Mombasa, Kenya, before, in June 1982, taking station off the coast of Lebanon after the Israeli invasion. After leaving the area another port visit took place in Toulon, France, before returning home on 14 July 1982.

From 1 October 1982 VA-37 became part of Carrier Air Wing Fifteen (CVW-15) and in January 1983 as part of CVW-15 they embarked on board the then newest Navy carrier, USS Carl Vinson.

VA-37 headed to Roosevelt Roads Naval Station in Puerto Rico in August 1982 for exercises with the destroyer USS Mahan, which was the test platform for the development of the CG/SM-2 (ER) missile program project.

On 1 March VA-37 sailed with CVW-15 and USS Carl Vinson on an eight-month would cruise that saw them operate in the Mediterranean Sea, Atlantic Ocean, Indian Ocean, Arabian Sea, South China Sea, and Pacific Ocean in a multitude of exercises and with port visits in Monte Carlo, Monaco, Casablanca, Morocco, Abidjan, Ivory Coast, Perth, Australia, Subic Bay, Philippines, Hong Kong, Sasebo, Japan, Pusan, Republic of Korea, and Pearl Harbor, Hawaii, before returning to NAS Cecil Field in Florida on 29 October 1983.

In June 1984, the squadron's primary mission was changed to close air support in preparation for its deployment to MCAS Iwakuni as part of the Marine Corps Unit Deployment Program. The deployment of the two Navy attack squadrons was designed to test the interoperability of the Marine Corps and Navy.

In December 1984, VA-37 deployed to MCAS Iwakuni and relieved VFA-105. While deployed to Iwakuni, the squadron was detached to Yechon, Korea, to participate in exercise Team Spirit 85. This was the first time a Navy carrier-based squadron had deployed in field conditions since World War II.

In April 1988, VA-37 deployed with Carrier Air Wing Six (CVW-6) on board USS Forrestal to the North Arabian Sea via the Suez Canal in support of Operation Earnest Will. The squadron spent 108 consecutive days at sea before USS Forrestal anchored at its first liberty port, Naples, Italy.

=== 1990s ===
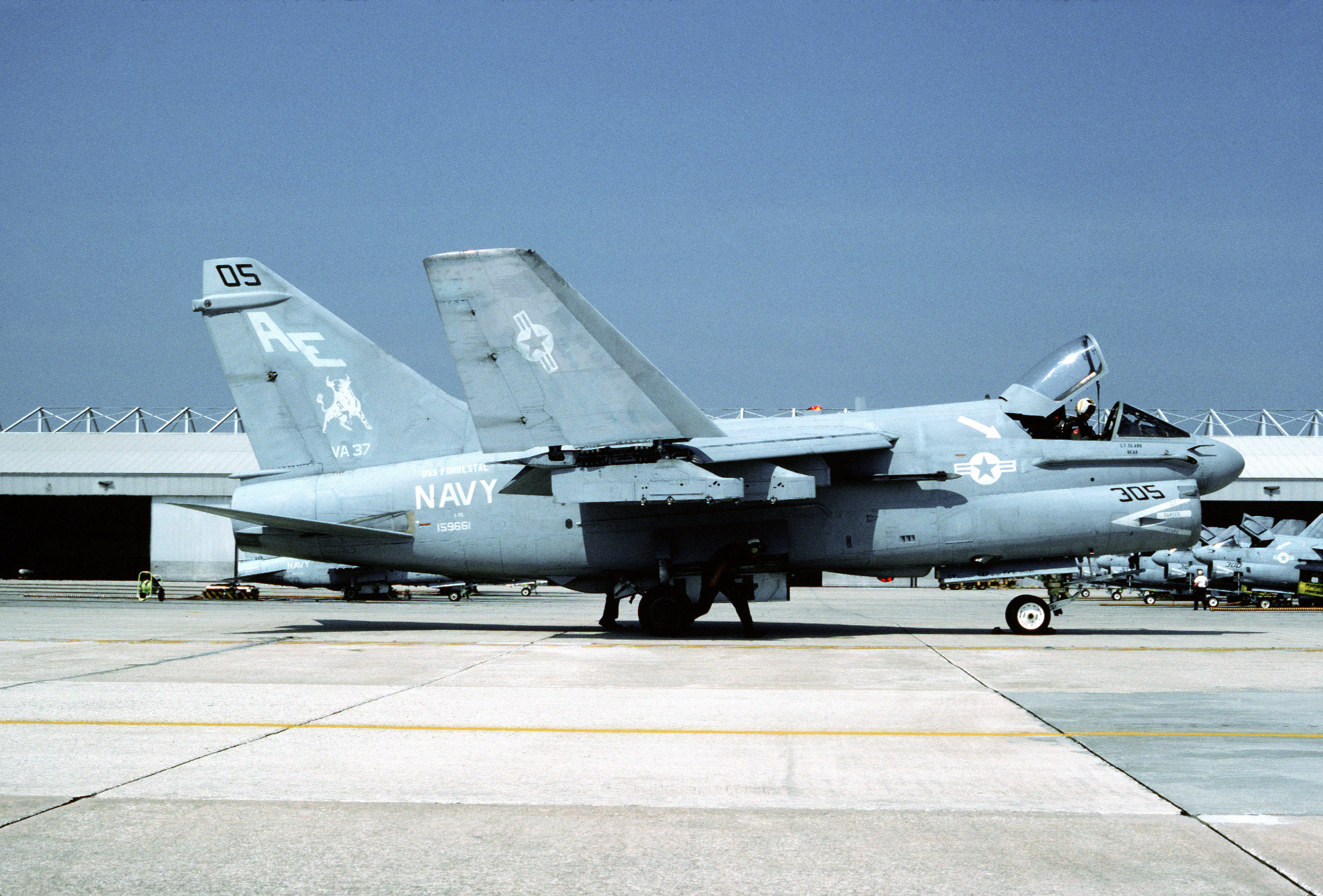
VA-37 A-7E

During the 1990s, the squadron deployed aboard USS John F. Kennedy, USS Dwight D. Eisenhower, USS Theodore Roosevelt, and USS Enterprise.

Following the Iraqi invasion of Kuwait in August 1990, several squadron aircraft were deployed with VA-72 in support of Operation Desert Shield.

On 31 October 1990, the squadron flew their last official sortie in the A-7E Corsair II. This ended a 25-year association in which over 115,000 flight hours and 25,000 arrestments were flown. On 28 November 1990, VA-37 was redesignated Strike Fight Squadron Thirty Seven (VFA-37) and began flying the F/A-18 Hornet. From October 1992 to April 1993, VFA-37 deployed to the Mediterranean Sea and participated in Operation Provide Comfort in northern Iraq and Operation Provide Promise in the airspace near the former Yugoslavia.

In 1994 the squadron flew missions over Iraq in support of Operation Southern Watch (OSW) and later over Bosnia in support of Operation Deny Flight. The squadron also participated in major exercises with the Kuwaitis, Saudis, and Israelis, as well as with many NATO allies.

In November 1996, the squadron flew in support of Operation Southern Watch and Operation Deliberate Guard over Bosnia-Herzegovina.

VFA-37 deployed again in November 1998. After four weeks of participating in OSW, the order was issued for Operation Desert Fox in Iraq. They also flew missions over the former Yugoslavia in Operation Deliberate Force.

The squadron relocated from Naval Air Station Cecil Field, Florida, to NAS Oceana, Virginia in July 1999.

=== 21st century ===
The next major deployment for VFA-37 was the maiden voyage of USS Harry S. Truman in 2000. In December 2002 VFA-37 deployed for their second cruise aboard Harry S. Truman. On 19 March 2003, the squadron participated in combat operations in Operation Iraqi Freedom (OIF). While flying from the eastern Mediterranean Sea, the squadron participated in the "shock and awe" campaign in Southern Iraq before shifting focus to assisting U.S. Forces in Northern Iraq. By the end of a successful 30-day air campaign in OIF, the squadron had flown 252 combat sorties over Iraq. The squadron returned to NAS Oceana on Memorial Day 2003.

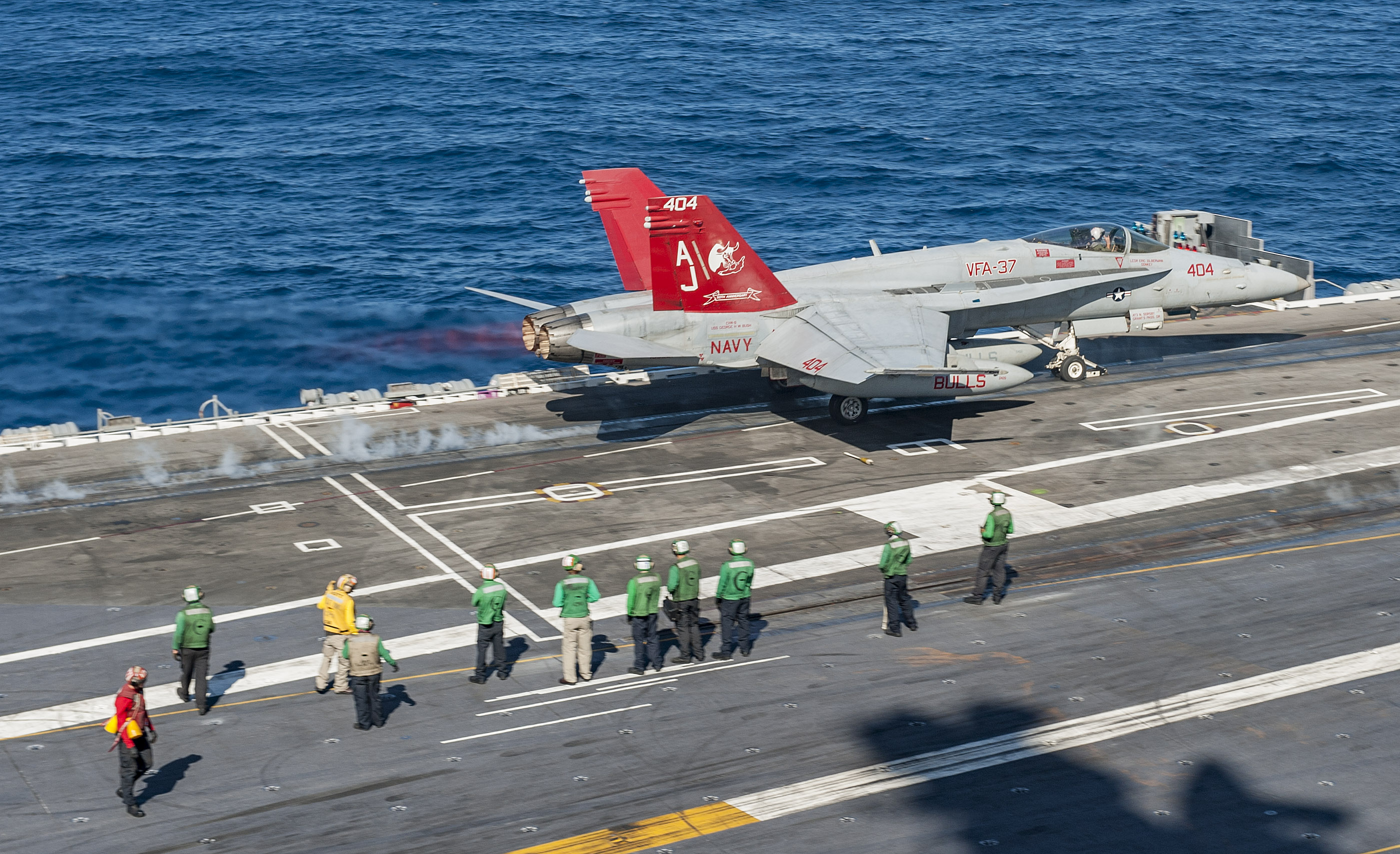
VFA-37 F/A-18C 50th anniversary jet launching from USS George H. W. Bush in October 2017.

VFA-37 deployed to the Persian Gulf and flew combat missions in support of Iraqi Freedom again from October 2004 to April 2005 from USS Harry S. Truman. In the spring of 2006, VFA-37 transferred to Carrier Air Wing Eight (CVW-8) for seven months to cover for VFA-213 as they transitioned to the F/A-18F.

The squadron deployed on USS Harry S. Truman in November 2007 in support of Operation Iraqi Freedom, returning to MAS Oceana on 4 June 2008. While deployed, they dropped a total of 10 t (22,000 lb) of ordnance.

VFA-37 again deployed on board USS Harry S. Truman to the Mediterranean Sea and the Indian Ocean from 21 May to 20 December 2010 and from 22 July 2013 to 18 April 2014.

In 2016, VFA-37 was reassigned to CVW-8. The wing is assigned to USS George H. W. Bush and deployed to the Mediterranean Sea and the Indian Ocean from 21 January to 21 August 2017.

In July 2018, VFA-37 retired the last F/A-18C Hornet and transitioned to the F/A-18E Super Hornet.

In November 2025, VFA-37 within CVW-8 onboard the USS Gerald R Ford were re-tasked from their scheduled deployment in the Mediterranean and sent to the Caribbean to support Operation Southern Spear. After completing their support of Southern Spear in early February 2026, VFA-31 and CVW-8 were again deployed across the Atlantic and into the Mediterranean to support potential combat operations against Iran.

In late Feb 2026, VFA-37 and their F/A-18Es undertook combat sorties within Operation Epic Fury against Iran. Combat sorties off the Ford began from the Eastern Mediterranean and moved to the Red Sea after close to a week of combat.

== See also ==
- History of the United States Navy
- Naval aviation
- Modern US Navy carrier air operations
- List of United States Navy aircraft squadrons
- List of Inactive United States Navy aircraft squadrons
