= VS-31 =

Sea Control Squadron 31
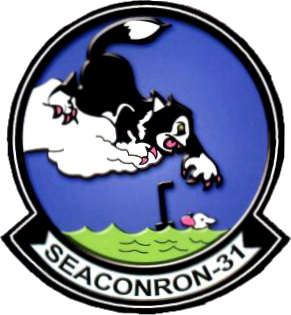
- VS-31 Insignia
- Active: 28 September 1948 – 31 March 2008
- Country: United States
- Branch: United States Navy
- Role: Anti-submarine warfare
- Former homeport: NAS Jacksonville
- Nickname(s): "Topcats"
- Aircraft flown: Douglas SBD Dauntless; Curtiss SB2C Helldiver; Grumman TBF Avenger; Grumman AF Guardian; Grumman S-2 Tracker; Lockheed S-3 Viking
- Engagements: Suez Crisis; Lebanon Crisis; Berlin Crisis; Operation Desert Shield; Operation Southern Watch; Operation Iraqi Freedom; Operation Enduring Freedom
- Decorations: Meritorious Unit Commendation (5); Joint Meritorious Unit Award; CNO Aviation Safety Award (8)

Sea Control Squadron 31 (VS-31) Topcats was a United States Navy anti-submarine warfare squadron.

During WWII there was a scouting squadron which carried the designation VS-31. It was established as Scouting Squadron 31 in 1942, based at Naval Air Station Squantum, Massachusetts. It flew the dive bombers Douglas SBD-5 Dauntless, then the Curtiss SB2C-4E Helldiver in the North Atlantic until disestablished at the end of the war in 1945.

The squadron which is the subject of this article was established as Composite Squadron VC-31 on 28 September 1948 at NAS Atlantic City, New Jersey, was re-designated Air Anti-Submarine Squadron 31 (VS-31) on 20 April 1950 and moved to NAS Quonset Point, Rhode Island. Originally flying the Grumman TBF Avenger, these were later replaced by the Grumman AF Guardian and the Grumman S-2 Tracker in 1954, and finally by the Lockheed S-3 Viking. In 1973, VS-31 was relocated to NAS Cecil Field, Florida, and eventually to NAS Jacksonville. On 1 October 1993 the VS designation was changed from "Air Anti-Submarine Squadron" to "Sea Control Squadron and VS-31 (along with all existing VS squadrons at the time) was renamed Sea Control Squadron VS-31. It was finally deactivated at NAS Jacksonville effective 31 March 2008, with a deactivation ceremony which took place on 27 March.

== Operational history ==
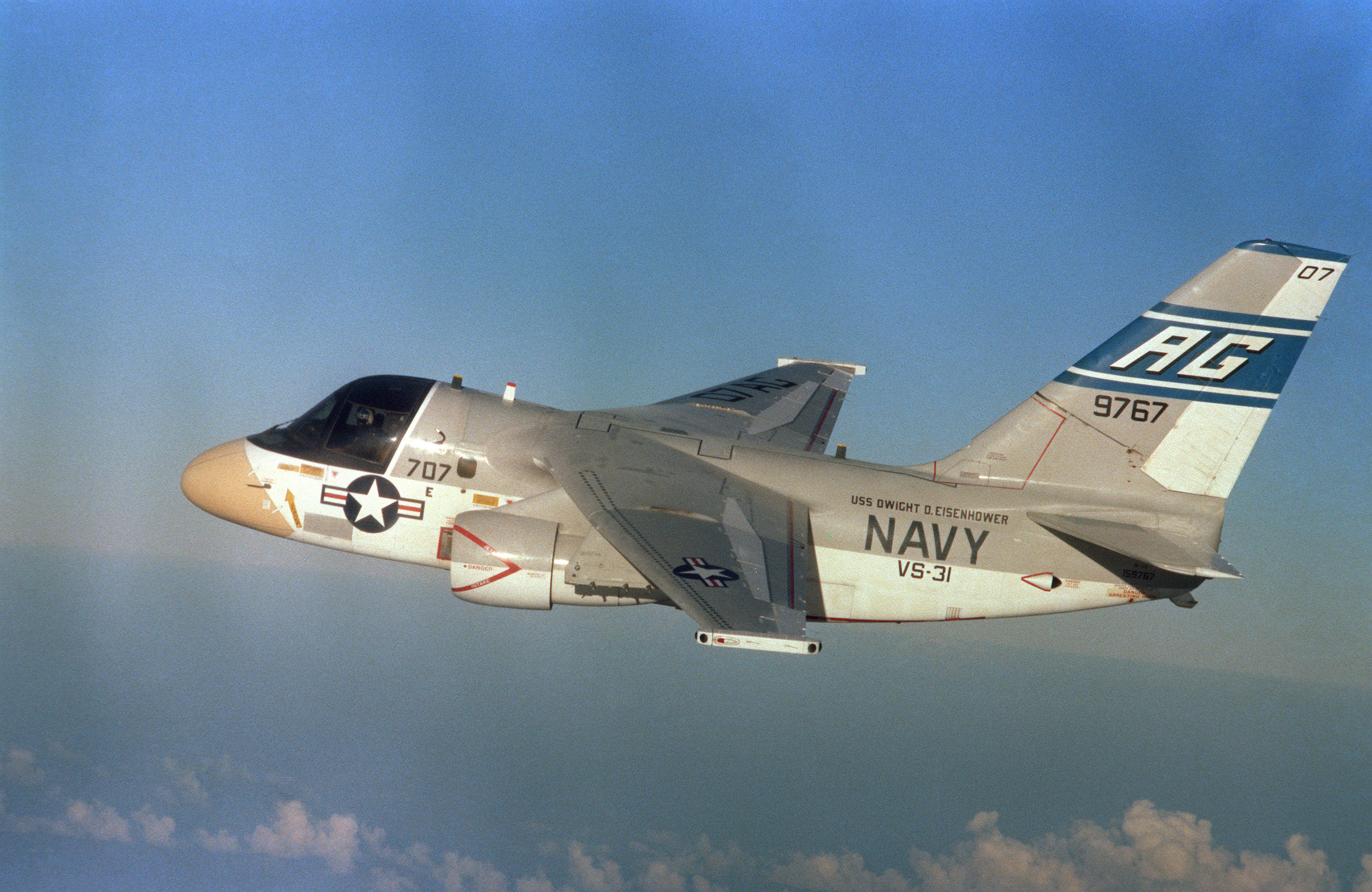
An S-3A of VS-31 assigned to CVW-7 aboard USS Dwight D. Eisenhower (CVN-69) in 1987.

The squadron performed carrier operations aboard various aircraft carriers. In 1956 it provided ASW support during the Suez Crisis from Antietam (CV-36). In 1958, from Wasp (CV-18), it served during the Lebanon Crisis, and also during the 1961 Berlin Crisis and the 1962 Cuban Missile crisis. In May 1963 it was stationed for the recovery of Mercury 9, and then for the recovery of Gemini 4 in June 1965. In 1990 the squadron participated in "Operation Desert Shield", arriving in the Red Sea within a few days of the invasion of Kuwait. In August 1992, the Topcats and the rest of CVW-7 switched aircraft carriers to the USS George Washington (CVN-73), the Navy's newest aircraft carrier. VS-31 deployed for Washington's maiden cruise and then again for the carrier's first Mediterranean Sea deployment in May 1994 where she took part in the 50th anniversary commemoration of the D-Day invasion and Operation Deny Flight. In 1998, the squadron was deployed aboard the John C. Stennis (CVN-74) on its maiden voyage, during which it spent 131 days in the Persian Gulf supporting "Operation Southern Watch". The squadron returned from its final deployment aboard the John C. Stennis in August 2007, after supporting Operations "Iraqi Freedom" and "Enduring Freedom".
