= Herlong Recreational Airport =

- IATA: none; ICAO: KHEG; FAA LID: HEG

Summary
- Airport type: Public
- Owner: Jacksonville Aviation Authority
- Serves: Jacksonville, Florida, U.S.
- Elevation AMSL: 87 ft (27 m)
- Coordinates: 30°16′40″N 081°48′21″W
- Website: www.flyjacksonville.com

Map
- Location of airport in Florida HEG (the United States)

Runways
Direction	Length		Surface
Direction	ft	m	Surface
7/25	4,000	1,219	Asphalt
11/29	3,500	1,067	Asphalt

Statistics (1999)
- Aircraft operations: 80,700
- Based aircraft: 162
- Source: Federal Aviation Administration

Herlong Recreational Airport (ICAO: KHEG, FAA LID: HEG), also known as Herlong Field, then Herlong Airport, is a public airport located eight nautical miles (13 km) southwest of the central business district of Jacksonville, a city in Duval County, Florida, United States.

This airport is assigned a three-letter location identifier of HEG by the Federal Aviation Administration, but it does not have an International Air Transport Association (IATA) airport code.

The Jacksonville Aviation Authority (JAA) owns all four public airports in Jacksonville. The airport was originally built during World War II to facilitate pilot training for the Navy and Air Force. After the war, the property was given to the city, and subsequently the JAA.

In recognition of the improvements and excellent operations, Herlong Recreational Airport was named the Florida Department of Transportation's General Aviation Airport of the Year in 2001.

== Facilities and aircraft ==
Herlong Recreational Airport covers an area of 1,484 acres (601 ha) which contains two asphalt paved runways: 7/25 measuring 4,000 x 100 ft (1,219 x 30 m) and 11/29 measuring 3,500 x 100 ft (1,067 x 30 m).

The airport has a fixed-base operator that sells fuel. It offers services such as general maintenance, catering, hangars, and courtesy cars; amenities include conference rooms, vending machines, a crew lounge, snooze rooms, and showers.

For the 12-month period ending October 20, 1999, the airport had 80,700 aircraft operations, an average of 221 per day: 97% general aviation and 3% military. There are 162 aircraft based at this airport: 70% single-engine, 9% multi-engine, 10% ultralight, 8% glider and 2% helicopter.

== Accidents and incidents ==
- On July 29, 2001, a Cessna 152 and Beech 35 collided on the ground at the Herlong Airport. The Cessna pilot had failed to ensure his brakes were set nd that the airplane was not rolling prior to diverting his attention to duties inside the cockpit.
- On March 20, 2004, the pilot of a Beech V35 Bonanza inadvertently retracted the landing gear while taxiing at the Herlong Airport. The aircraft was substantially damaged.
- On October 20, 2004, a Cessna P206 crashed shortly after takeoff from the Herlong Airport. The aircraft was operating a skydiving flight. Witnesses reported the airplane was in a nose-high attitude, and a surviving passenger said the pilot frantically moved the elevator trim wheel several times in the down position. The probable cause of the accident was found to be an improper setting of the elevator trim by the pilot-in-command, the pilot's failure to follow the checklist related to elevator trim setting, and the pilot's failure to maintain Vs during climb after takeoff, resulting in an inadvertent stall, uncontrolled descent, and in-flight collision with terrain.
- On March 3, 2005, a Cessna 172 was damaged during a hard landing at the Herlong Airport.
- August 4, 2009, a Eurocopter AS 350B3 helicopter was substantially damaged while maneuvering at Herlong Recreational Airport. The pilots were practicing maneuvers with the hydraulic system turned off to simulate a hydraulic system failure. The probable cause of the accident was found to be the flight instructor's improper decision to attempt hover flight without hydraulic power and his subsequent loss of control.
- On August 31, 2010, an Aero Commander 560 experienced a dual loss of engine power just after departure from the Herlong Recreational Airport. The plane was en route to the nearby Jacksonville Executive Airport for scheduled maintenance.
- On May 27, 2016, a Diamond DA40 was damaged during a runway excursion at the Herlong Recreation Airport. The accident's probable cause was found to be the pilot's failure to maintain directional control during the landing roll in crosswind conditions.
- On June 23, 2018, a Cessna 182 Skylane performed an emergency landing one mile from the Herlong Recreational Airport after a complete loss of engine power. The pilot was not injured.
- On December 26, 2021, a Mooney M20J crashed after departing the Herlong Recreational Airport.
- On September 13, 2023, a driver died after crashing a car into a hangar at the Herlong Recreational Airport.

== See also ==
- List of airports in Florida
