= Cecil Commerce Center =

Business park in Jacksonville, Florida

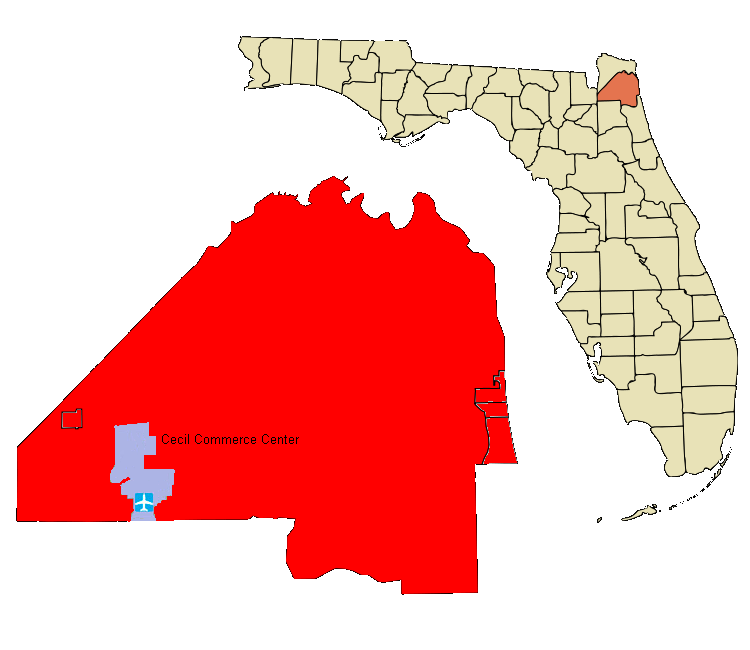
- Interactive map of Cecil Commerce Center
- Location: Jacksonville, Florida, United States
- Coordinates: 30°13′07″N 081°52′36″W
- Developer: Hillwood Development Company
- Owner: City of Jacksonville
- Size: 17,000 acres (6,900 ha)
- Website: www.jaxcecilcommercecenter.com

Cecil Commerce Center (CCC) is a commercial and industrial center in Jacksonville, Florida. It is located on Jacksonville's Westside on the former Naval Air Station Cecil Field and includes Cecil Airport. The 17,000-acre center represents more than 3 percent of the land area in Duval County, most of which is zoned for development. The property was conveyed to the City of Jacksonville and converted to its current use between 1999 and 2002.

== History ==
In July 1993, former Naval Air Station Cecil Field in Jacksonville, Florida was recommended for closure by the Base Realignment and Closure Commission. In response to the decision to close NAS Cecil Field, the Mayor of Jacksonville established the Cecil Field Development Commission, succeeded by the Jacksonville Economic Development Commission (JEDC), and later the Office of Economic Development (OED). One of the major responsibilities of the commission was to develop a proposed base reuse plan that would guide the transition of NAS Cecil Field from a fully operational Navy base to civilian use.

In 1996, the NAS Cecil Field Final Base Reuse Plan was approved and in March 1999, the Jacksonville City Council approved the Cecil Commerce Center Operations and Business Plan. The plan projected that businesses at the CCC would have 5,600 employees by 2009 and 25,000 by 2019. Between July 1999 and April 2002, property was conveyed to the JEDC (now the OED), Jacksonville Aviation Authority (JAA), the City of Jacksonville Parks Department and Clay County.

Existing recreational facilities within the area were included with surrounding acreage to create the Cecil Recreation Complex, which was expanded to create the Jacksonville Equestrian Center, Cecil Aquatic Center, and other new recreation opportunities.

Since the time of the conveyance of approximately 8,300 acres (34 km^{2}), the OED has worked to promote the site as a prime location for companies in the manufacturing, industrial-related and distribution industries, as well as other uses including support retail and office space along the main roads.

The Jacksonville Aviation Authority controls the land surrounding the airport and south of Normandy Boulevard. Several aviation companies have leased all the former Navy hangars at the airport. Most of this area was developed by the Navy before the base was closed. Land to the north of Normandy Boulevard is controlled by the city of Jacksonville and is mostly wetlands. Many sites require four feet of fill, establishing drainage and building a road to the parcel from New World Avenue, the main thoroughfare connecting Normandy with Cecil Commerce Center Parkway. There is also no railroad service at CCC, so if a business needed it, the city would need to pay for a spur that crosses Interstate 10.

The biggest development goal was to attract a mega-project, such as an aircraft or vehicle assembly plant which would employ thousands. Those projects usually depend on incentives, and competition among the states of North Carolina, Georgia, Alabama and Florida is intense. CCC has competed for several big deals, including an aircraft manufacturing plant for Boeing, a complex for Spirit AeroSystems, and a van assembly plant for DaimlerChrysler.

The Cecil Commerce Center Parkway and I-10 interchange was completed in October, 2009. The $62 million project provided direct access to Cecil Commerce Center and was the first section of the new, regional First Coast Expressway. In 2009, the actual number of people employed at CCC in 2009 was approximately 2,000, just one-third of the projected number.

On June 8, 2010, the city signed a contract with Hillwood as Master Developer for CCC to expedite development, provide expertise, strategy and private capital for the long term project.

== Current developments ==
- As master developer of approximately 4,475 acres of City-owned property at Cecil Commerce Center, Hillwood branded the site with their premiere brand name – AllianceFlorida at Cecil Commerce Center. Hillwood agreed to invest more than $1.3 billion to develop the entire 31-million-square-foot master plan. These developments will attract companies that will bring thousands of new jobs and expand the tax base.
- FlightStar, a heavy aircraft maintenance, repair, and overhaul contractor, is constructing a $27 million, 30,000 sq. ft. hangar expected to be completed in the first quarter of 2014. They will hire an additional 400 people, bringing their total employment at Cecil Commerce Center to more than 800.
- Florida State College at Jacksonville completed construction of a state-of-the-art truck driving facility at their North Cecil Campus.
- Boeing moved its F-18 repair operations to Cecil Commerce Center, creating 60 jobs in Jacksonville. Boeing leased a city-owned building and invested $4 million in tenant improvements and equipment.
- SAFT America, Inc., a world leader in the design and manufacture of high-technology batteries, constructed a 277,560 sq. ft. lithium battery manufacturing plant on 12 acres at Cecil. SAFT invested more than $200 million in new capital and employs 279 people at the new facility.
- Bridgestone Americas Tire Operations purchased 63.3 acres in Cecil Commerce Center North and constructed a 1-million-square-foot distribution center. The site employs 250 people and represents a private capital investment of $44 million.
- Florida State College at Jacksonville completed phase one of a new, 44,000-square-foot center in Cecil Commerce Center North. The new campus offers general education courses.
- The U.S. Coast Guard has recently renovated its 32,000-square-foot building and added 150 new personnel to its drug interdiction operation at Cecil. Overall annual payroll for the operation is approximately $12 million.

== Existing Users ==
Currently, there are more than 4,500 jobs generated by the various entities located at Cecil Commerce Center. A listing of these various establishments includes:

- Bridgestone Americas Tire Operations
- CDI-M & T Co.
- Department of Homeland Security, Customs and Border Protection
- Department of Homeland Security, U.S. Coast Guard
- Fleet Readiness Center Southeast
- Flightstar Aircraft Services
- Florida Army National Guard
- Florida State College at Jacksonville
- Jacksonville Fire & Rescue Department Fire Station 56, Fire Station 73 (under construction)
- Jacksonville JetPort
- JEAces
- L-3 Communications, Titan Group
- LSI
- Northrop Grumman
- Robinson Aviation
- Saft America, Inc.
- State of Florida, Division of Forestry
- The Boeing Company
- VT Griffin
- Woods Group, Pratt & Whitney
- Amazon
