= Jacksonville Port Authority =

Government agency

- Abbreviation: JPA, JAXPORT
- Formation: 1963
- Type: agency
- Purpose: Maintain, market & manage the public port facilities in Jacksonville
- Headquarters: Jacksonville, Florida
- Location: 2831 Talleyrand Avenue
- Region served: Duval County, Florida
- CEO: Eric Green
- Main organ: JAXPORT Magazine
- Budget: $69 million
- Staff: 171
- Volunteers: 7
- Website: www.jaxport.com

The Jacksonville Port Authority (JPA) also known by its brand name, JAXPORT, is the independent government agency in Jacksonville, Florida, United States, that owns and operates much of the seaport system at the Port of Jacksonville.

== History ==
The Jacksonville Port Authority replaced the city's Department of Docks and Terminals and was created in 1963 by Florida's Legislature to progress, preserve, and promote the city's port facilities.

The Port Authority was chartered by the state, and intended to be a government entity that would operate like a business; however, it received 1.5 mils of property tax authority that generated nearly half a million dollars during 1963 (equivalent to $30 million in 2003). Jacksonville airports were under the control of the Port Authority since its inception, but in May 2001, the Florida State Legislature approved the restructuring of the Jacksonville Port Authority into two separate entities (City J-Bill-1104); the Jacksonville Aviation Authority (JAA) and the Jacksonville Seaport Authority effective October 1, 2001. In 2003, the act was amended to reinstate the name Jacksonville Port Authority instead of Seaport.

== Function ==
Jacksonville’s port is one of the largest commercial cargo ports on the Atlantic Coast. JAXPORT controls docks and wharfs, cranes, a passenger cruise terminal, warehouses, paved open storage areas, and road connections to the public highway system. JPA maintains these facilities and manages their overall use. As of October 2011, only JAXPORT security officers and off-duty members of the Jacksonville Sheriff's Office are involved in handling calls for service on property owned by JAXPORT.

=== Governance ===
The JPA is governed by a seven-member Board of Directors. The Mayor of Jacksonville appoints four Board members, and the Florida Governor appoints three members. Each member serves a four-year, unpaid term. From its membership, the Board elects its own Chairman, Vice Chairman, Secretary, and Treasurer for one-year terms.

=== Funding ===
Tax dollars are not used to fund JAXPORT's operating expenses. Private companies lease space and equipment at the port, and that revenue is used to fund port operations. In 2010 JAXPORT recorded $50.6 million in operating revenues, and $32 million in operating expenses. The authority does receive state and federal grants to pay for construction (capital) and security projects. JAXPORT itself has no authority to assess taxes.

=== Economic impact ===
Due to the local maritime industry Jacksonville's maritime industry supports more than 65,000 employees. These include private sector jobs such as longshoremen, crane operators, truck drivers, warehouse workers, and others working in industries which rely on the port.

=== Initiatives ===
- Expand Port Business, which would create new jobs and stimulate the economy in northeast Florida.
- Increase Cruise Business, which would increase income from tourism.
- Deepen The Harbor, which would allow "supersized" ships to dock. When the current Panama Canal expansion project was completed in 2014, jumbo ships from China began utilizing deep-water Atlantic Ocean ports. To remain competitive, Jacksonville began a project in 2011 to deepen their shipping channel from 42' to 47'. The JPA celebrated completion of that project on May 23, 2022.

== Seaport services and facilities ==
=== Cargo operations ===
Every year, imported and exported goods are shipped from more than 100 countries through the Jacksonville port. In this harbor, the Jacksonville Port Authority owns the JAXPORT Cruise Terminal and three cargo terminals: the Blount Island Marine Terminal, Talleyrand Marine Terminal and Dames Point Marine Terminal.

=== Cruise operations ===
Carnival Cruise Lines utilizes the JAXPORT Cruise Terminal to offer year-round service on the Carnival Ecstasy to Key West and the Bahamas. The authority intends to relocate the terminal.

=== Ferry service ===
The St. Johns River Ferry (also known as the Mayport Ferry) has provided service across the 9/10 mile between Mayport and Fort George Island since the 1874. The Florida Department of Transportation had always been responsible for the ferry, but its funding was vetoed by Governor Charlie Crist for the 2007-2008 budget. The City of Jacksonville assumed the responsibility in 2007, and spent $1 million more than the income from fares. After Mayor John Peyton announced that there was no money available in the 2008 budget, JAXPORT took over operation of the ferry and lost half a million dollars each year, but used port revenue, not tax money, to underwrite the expense. The ferry service operator is Hornblower Marine Services. In 2012 JAXPORT announced that it would no longer be responsible for the ferry. In response, the city commission created the new St. Johns River Ferry Commission. JAXPORT agreed to contribute $200,000 toward operations, the city of Jacksonville kicked in $200,000 with the state DOT paying $250,000.

== Private facilities ==
JAXPORT facilities do not handle all the cargo moving over the St. Johns River. In fact, more than 20 maritime facilities in Jacksonville's harbor are owned and operated by other entities. These facilities include private dry docks, petroleum terminals, and military bases. The JPA does not operate or manage private boat marinas, water taxis, bridges, or the Northbank and Southbank Riverwalks.

== See also ==
- Blount Island
- Port of Jacksonville
