= JAXPORT Cruise Terminal =

Cruise ship terminal in Jacksonville, Florida

Coordinates: 30°24.50′N 81°34.65′W

The JAXPORT Cruise Terminal () is a 63,000 sq ft (5,900 m^{2}) "temporary" cruise ship terminal in Jacksonville, Florida. The facility located at the northwest corner of the Dames Point Marine Terminal, beside the Dames Point Bridge. It was completed in six months during 2003 and is a facility at the Port of Jacksonville, administered by the Jacksonville Port Authority. The baggage handling area is 28,000 sq ft (2,600 m^{2}); and a passenger embarkation section has 15,000 sq ft (1,400 m^{2}). Vehicle access to the site is via Hecksher Drive and there is paved parking for about 600 cars.

Celebrity Cruises began regular service from Jacksonville on October 27, 2003, on the MV Zenith. Celebrity discontinued their service from Jacksonville in 2005.

The ship Carnival Miracle was christened at the Port of Jacksonville on February 27, 2004, beginning Jacksonville service by Carnival Cruise Lines. The Carnival Miracle was replaced by Carnival Cruise Lines' Jubilee, which sailed between JAXPORT and The Bahamas from May 2004 through August 2004. Carnival established year-round cruise service from Jacksonville aboard the Celebration on October 12, 2004. The Celebration continued to sail between JAXPORT and The Bahamas through April 2008. After a four-month hiatus in service, Carnival restarted Jacksonville-Bahamas cruise service aboard the Carnival Fascination, which provided service from Jacksonville until April 2016, being replaced with Carnival Elation. The Carnival Elation was replaced by the Carnival Ectasy in 2019. As of 2022, cruises from Jacksonville visit the Bahamas and Eastern Caribbean sailed aboard the Carnival Elation.

During the COVID-19 pandemic all cruises were suspended. The first post-pandemic cruise was the American Queen Voyages ship, Ocean Voyager which departed February 21, 2022 for a 12-day cruise to destinations along the Atlantic coast. The Carnival Spirit operated from Jacksonville from March 7, 2022, to April 9, 2022.

Five cruise ships were chartered to serve as floating hotels during the week preceding Super Bowl XXXIX in February 2005. Four of the vessels docked at JAXPORT terminals, providing over 3,500 rooms plus restaurants and night clubs for fans.

The Jacksonville Port Authority had plans to relocate the cruise terminal. In 2008, an 8-acre (32,000 m^{2}) parcel was purchased in the small fishing village of Mayport as the site of a permanent $60 million facility. The economic crisis delayed the project, and opposition from local residents was vehement; a lawsuit seeking an injunction was filed. In March 2010, the authority announced that they were starting over and reviewing all possible locations for the cruise terminal.

In February 2024, Norwegian Cruise Line announced plans to sail from the port for the first time in its history. Beginning Nov. 2025, they will to offer seasonal cruises to The Bahamas and Eastern Caribbean every year through 2028 out of Jacksonville. The Norwegian Gem will do cruises for 2025–2026 season, and the Norwegian Dawn will season the 2026–2027 season.
