= VA-72 (U.S. Navy) =

Attack Squadron 72
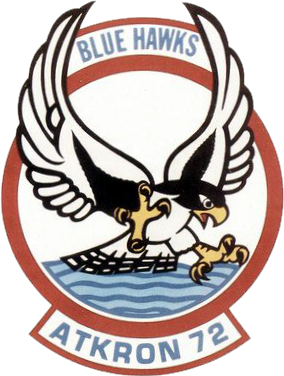
- Active: 25 January 1945 – 30 June 1991
- Country: United States
- Branch: United States Navy
- Nickname(s): Blue Hawks
- Engagements: Korean War; Vietnam War; Operation El Dorado Canyon; 1991 Gulf War

Aircraft flown
- Attack: Douglas A-4 Skyhawk; LTV A-7 Corsair II
- Fighter: Grumman F6F Hellcat; Grumman F8F Bearcat; Grumman F9F Panther

Attack Squadron 72 (VA-72) was an aviation unit of the U.S. Navy. It was established as Bomber Fighter Squadron 18 (VBF-18) on 25 January 1945. The squadron was redesignated as Fighter Squadron 8A (VF-8A) on 15 November 1946, as VF-72 on 28 July 1948, and finally as VA-72 on 3 January 1956. It was disestablished on 30 June 1991.

The squadron's nickname from 1945 to 1950 was "Bearcats", followed by "Hawks" until 1962, and the Blue Hawks from that point forward. Its first insignia, a bearcat, was approved in 1946; a new one, featuring a peregrine falcon, was approved in 1950. Its last insignia, with a blue hawk, was current from 1956 until the squadron's disestablishment 35 years later.

== Operational history ==
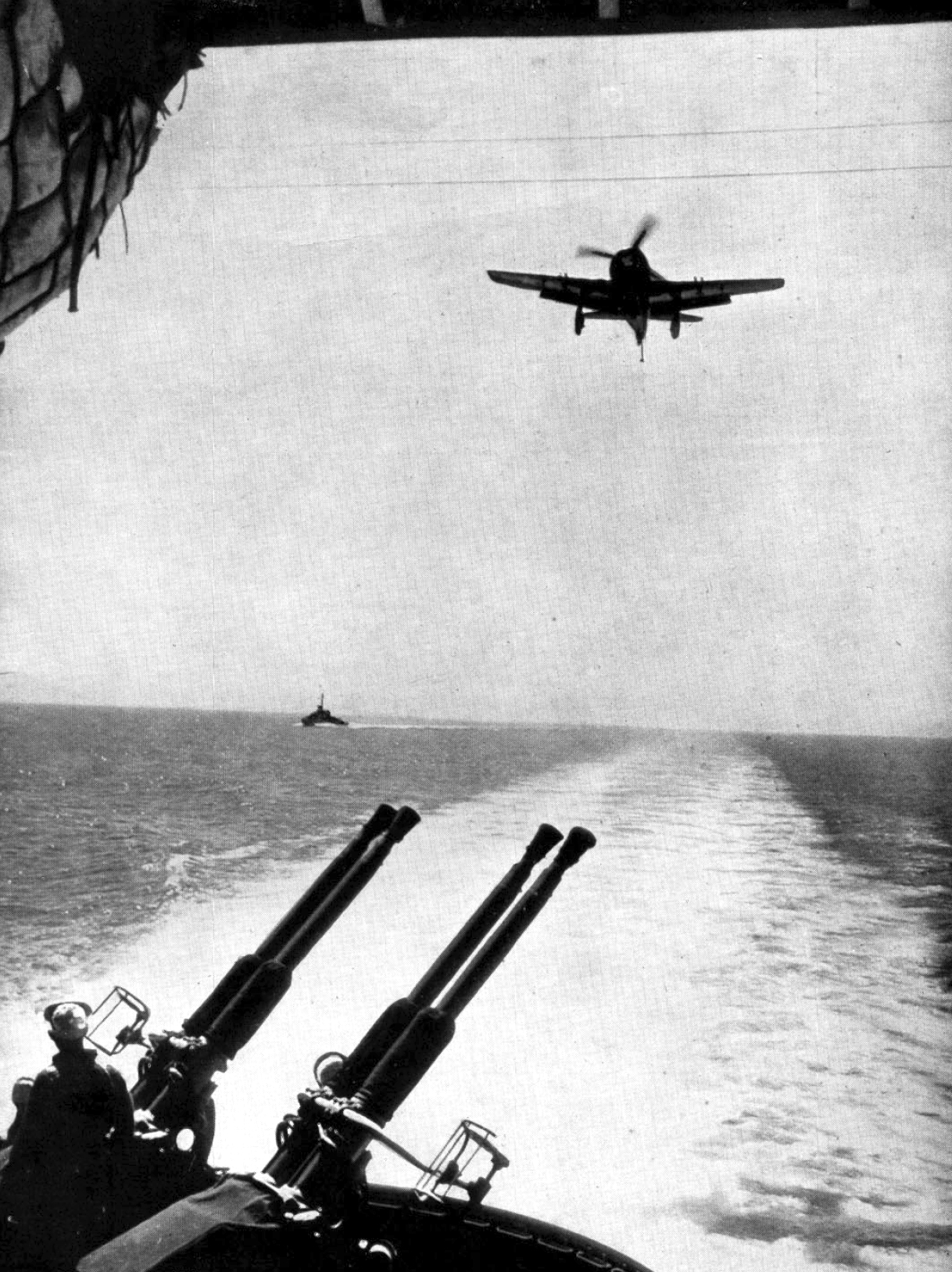
A VF-8A F8F-1B approaching USS Leyte, in 1947.

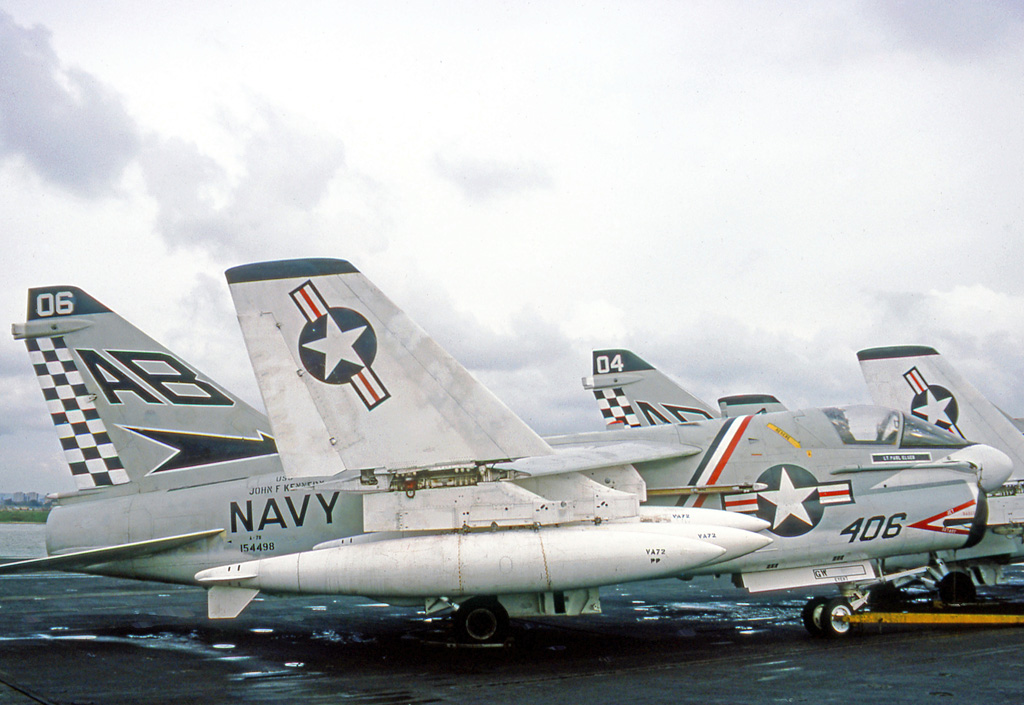
An A-7B of VA-72 on USS John F. Kennedy, October 1976.

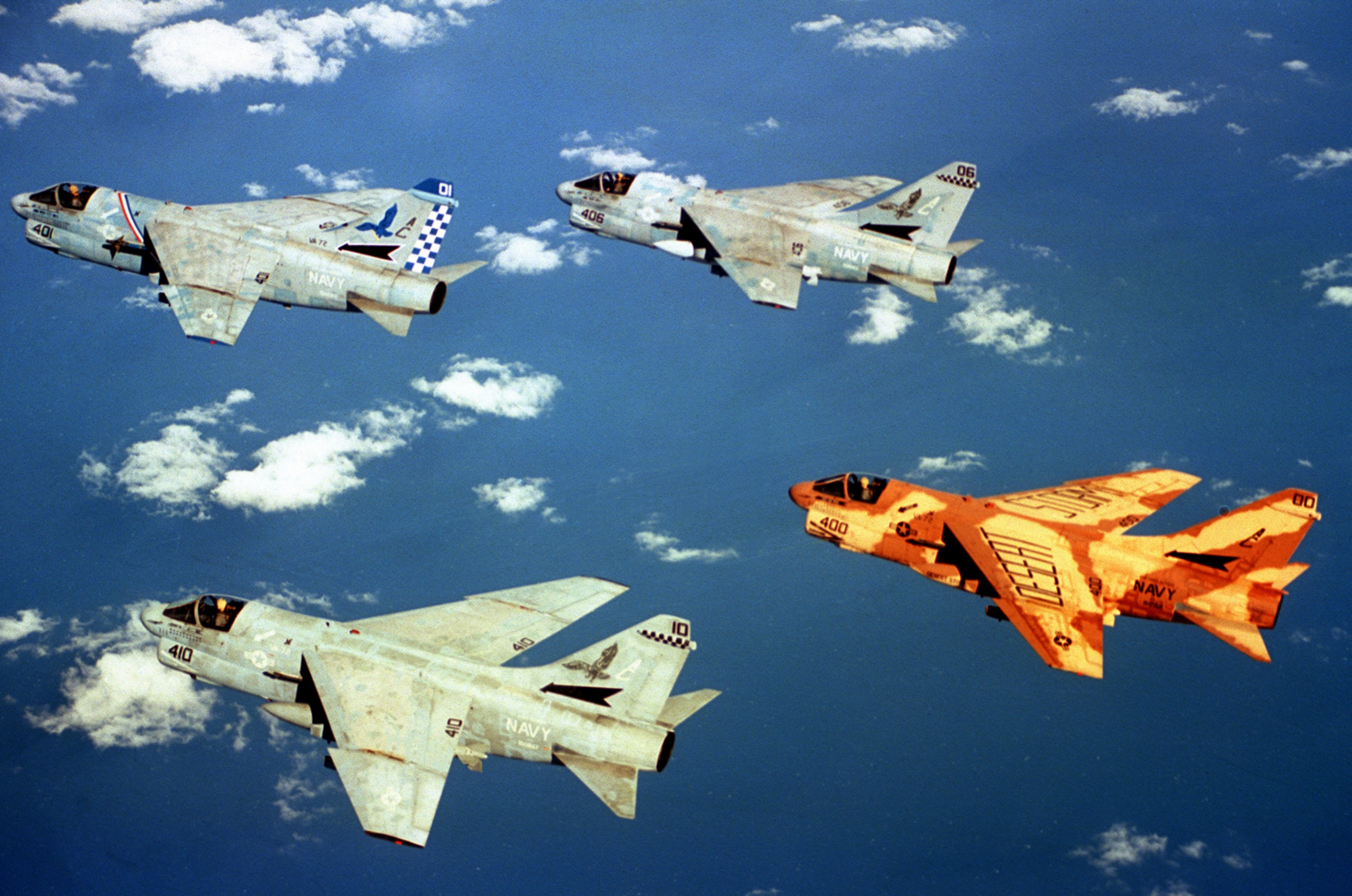
A-7E Corsair IIs of VA-72 in June 1991.

- September–December 1946: Participated in USS Leyte's shakedown cruise in the Caribbean Sea and a goodwill cruise to South America for the inauguration of Chile’s President Gabriel González Videla.
- 19 August 1948: Squadron commanding officer, Lieutenant Commander B. F. Haker, lost at sea while attempting a carrier approach.
- 25 January 1949: Cross deck operations with the British carrier HMS Triumph in the Mediterranean.
- April 1961: The squadron operated from USS Independence in an area south of Guantanamo Bay, Cuba, during the Bay of Pigs Invasion, the unsuccessful invasion of Cuba by American supported Cuban exiles.
- 22 October–22 November 1962: Participated in the Cuban Quarantine while embarked on Independence.

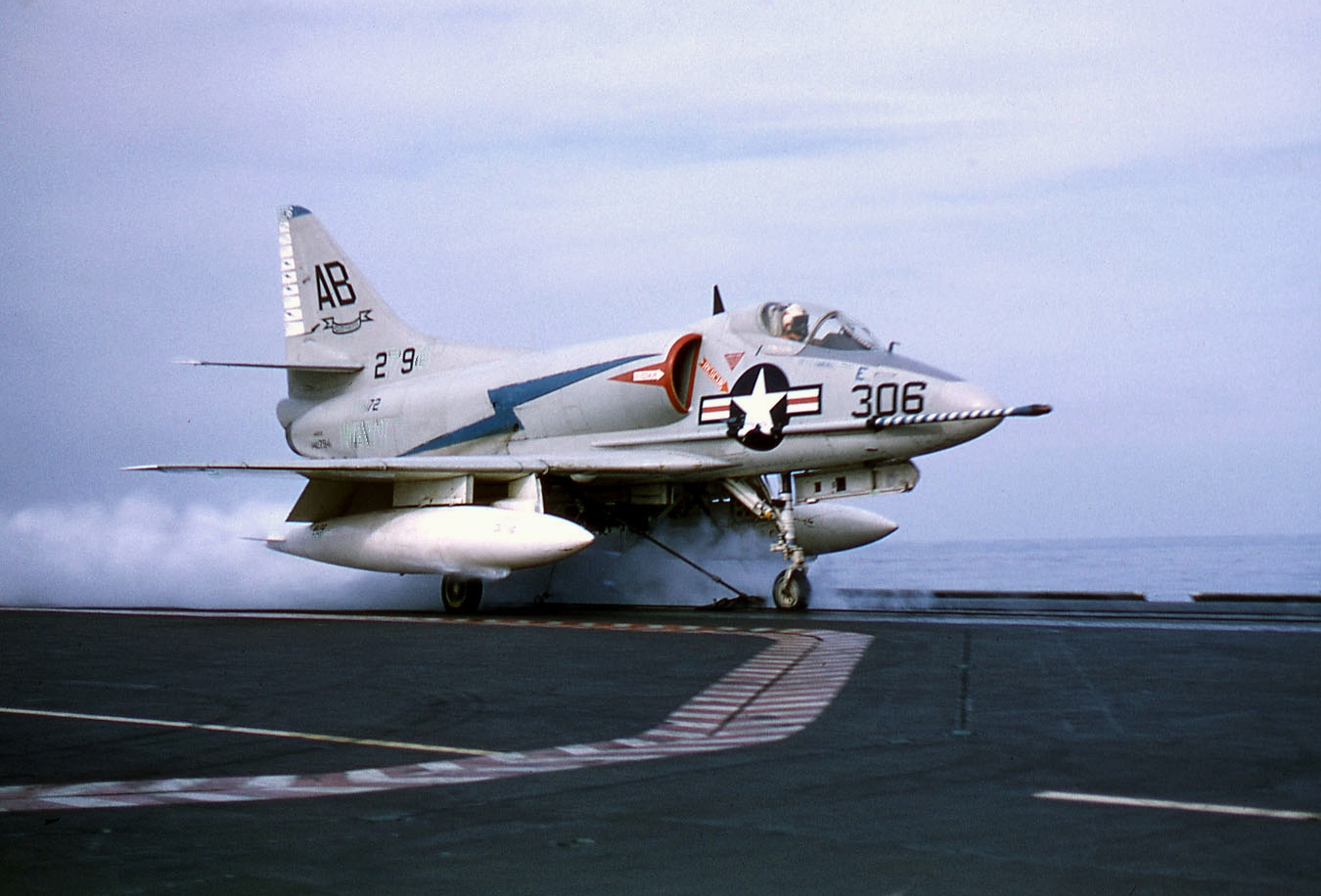
A VA-72 A4D-2 launching from USS Franklin D. Roosevelt, in 1959.

- 10–16 May 1963: A detachment of three aircraft deployed on USS Wasp to provide courier service during a Project Mercury space flight of the Faith 7 capsule.
- 17 October 1965: The squadron’s executive officer, Commander H. B. Southworth, led the first successful strike against a surface-to-air SA-2 missile installation in North Vietnam. The strike was composed of four VA-72 A-4Es and one A-6A from VA-75.
- 18 September 1970: While operating in the Caribbean aboard USS John F. Kennedy, the squadron was ordered to deploy with the carrier to the Mediterranean due to the fighting between Jordanian and Palestinian forces and the intervention of Syria on behalf of the Palestinians.
- October 1973: With the outbreak of the Yom Kippur War, Kennedy and her air wing, while operating in the North Atlantic after just completing a Mediterranean deployment, were ordered back to the Mediterranean. VA-72 conducted flight operations while the carrier was on station south of Crete, from the latter part of October through mid November.
- 17–19 September 1985: VA-72, along with other units of CVW-1, were the first to conduct flight operations from a carrier operating inside a fjord. USS America operated in Vestfjorden, Norway, during this evolution.
- 22–27 March 1986: During Freedom of Navigation Exercises in the Gulf of Sidra and the resulting combat action with Libyan forces, VA-72 flew patrols to protect the task force from attack by surface ships or submarines and also provided aerial refueling missions for fighters flying combat air patrols.
- 14 April 1986: The United States initiated Operation Eldorado Canyon, air strikes against targets in Libya. VA-72 provided air-to-surface missile support for possible employment against surface-to-air missile radar sites.
- September–October 1990 and December 1990–January 1991: The squadron participated in Operation Desert Shield, the buildup of American and Allied forces to counter a threatened invasion of Saudi Arabia by Iraq and as part of an economic blockade of Iraq to force its withdrawal from Kuwait.
- 17 January 1991: Operation Desert Storm, combat operations to remove Iraqi forces from Kuwait, was launched. The squadron’s A-7Es participated in the first combat strike against Iraqi targets in Baghdad.
- 29 January 1991: Squadron aircraft flew their first combat mission in the Kuwait theater, striking Iraqi troops, tanks and artillery positions.
- 27 February 1991: Squadron aircraft participated in the last naval air combat strike of the war, hitting retreating Iraqi troops east of Najaf, Iraq. During the 43 days of war the squadron flew 362 sorties without the loss of a pilot or aircraft.
- 8 June 1991: The last two squadron aircraft participated in the Desert Storm Victory Parade flyover in Washington, D.C.

== Home port assignments ==
The squadron was assigned to these home ports, effective on the dates shown:

- Naval Air Station Astoria – 25 January 1945
- Naval Air Station San Diego – 22 April 1945
- Naval Air Station Quonset Point – 14 November 1945
- Naval Air Station Oceana – 3 September 1957
- Naval Air Station Cecil Field – 15 February 1966

== Aircraft assignment ==
The squadron first received the following aircraft on the dates shown:

- F6F-3/5 Hellcat – 7 February 1945
- F8F-1 Bearcat – 10 August 1945
- F8F-1B Bearcat – January 1947
- F8F-2 Bearcat – 20 March 1948
- F8F-1 Bearcat – 1 December 1948
- F8F-1B Bearcat – 9 February 1950
- F9F-2 Panther – 16 March 1951
- F9F-5 Panther – 11 October 1951
- F9F-2 Panther – February 1952
- F9F-5 Panther – February 1953
- A4D-1 Skyhawk – September 1956
- A4D-2 Skyhawk – 12 February 1958
- A4D-2N/A-4C Skyhawk – March 1961
- A-4E Skyhawk – May 1964
- A-4B Skyhawk – March 1967
- A-7B Corsair II – January 1970
- A-7E Corsair II – 13 September 1977

== See also ==
- Attack aircraft
- List of inactive United States Navy aircraft squadrons
- History of the United States Navy
