= Jacksonville Executive at Craig Airport =

- IATA: CRG; ICAO: KCRG; FAA LID: CRG

Summary
- Airport type: Public
- Owner: Jacksonville Aviation Authority
- Serves: Jacksonville, Florida
- Elevation AMSL: 41 ft (12 m)
- Coordinates: 30°20′11″N 081°30′52″W
- Website: www.flyjacksonville.com/Home.aspx?sMP=JAXEX

Map
- Location of airport in Florida CRG (the United States)

Runways
Direction	Length		Surface
Direction	ft	m	Surface
5/23	4,004	1,220	Asphalt
14/32	4,008	1,222	Asphalt

Statistics (2018)
- Aircraft operations (year ending 2/7/2018): 158,769
- Based aircraft: 203
- Source: Federal Aviation Administration

Jacksonville Executive at Craig Airport (IATA: CRG, ICAO: KCRG, FAA LID: CRG), formerly known as Craig Municipal Airport, is a public airport located eight miles (13 km) east of the central business district of Jacksonville, in Duval County, Florida, United States. It is owned by the Jacksonville Aviation Authority.

This mid-sized general aviation airport handles personal aircraft and small commuter planes. The entrance is located along St. Johns Bluff Road north of Atlantic Blvd, although it also borders Atlantic Boulevard to the south. The airport has a control tower and handles 400-500 aircraft operations daily.

The airport is named for James Craig, a Jacksonville native who died aboard the USS Pennsylvania during the Japanese attack on Pearl Harbor.

== History ==
The airport previously served as a joint civil-military airport hosting an Army Aviation Support Facility and helicopter units of the Florida Army National Guard prior to their relocation to nearby Cecil Field following the latter facility's inactivation as a naval air station in 1999.

The airport underwent two name changes between late 2010 and early 2011. The airport was originally named Craig Municipal Airport, and it became Jacksonville Executive Airport. The name subsequently changed again, officially becoming Jacksonville Executive at Craig. The second name change was brought about by public anger over Craig's name being removed from the airport's title.

== Events ==
The United States Navy's Blue Angels performed their first airshow at Jacksonville Executive at Craig Airport on June 15, 1946.

In 2024, the airport hosted an Aerospace Day to introduce kids to aviation. Visitors met with local pilots and flight instructors.

== Facilities and aircraft ==
=== Facilities ===
Jacksonville Executive at Craig Airport covers an area of 1,432 acres (580 ha) which contains two asphalt paved runways: 5/23 measuring 4,004 x 120 ft and 14/32 measuring 4,008 x 120 ft.

Runway 5/23 was repaved during the summer of 2011. In addition to filling cracks and adding a 120- x 150-foot blast pad, the entire runway was surfed with a 0.5-inch leveling course and a 1.5 inch Superpave surface course. In January 2012, the paving project was awarded the inaugural Ray Brown Airport Pavement Award by the National Asphalt Pavement Association, recognizing it as the highest quality airport asphalt pavement project completed during 2011.

The airport has 2 fixed-base operators on the field, JAX Executive Jet Center and Sky Harbor Aviation. Both sell fuel and offer a variety of services and amenities.

==== Amazon Warehouse ====
The JAA board unanimously voted to approve a ground lease agreement with Amazon Services LLC in July 2023 to build a 181,000-square-foot warehouse on 79 acres.

Jacksonville Executive Craig Airport's current CEO, Mark VanLoh, said Amazon is its highest paying tenant at Craig Airport, which is in East Arlington at northeast Atlantic Boulevard and St. Johns Bluff Road.

In October 2020, the JAA conducted a public solicitation through a request for interest to identify parties to lease and develop the available nonaeronautical property.

Seefried Development Properties Inc, on behalf of Amazon Services LLC, is developing the more than $40 million warehouse and distribution facility.

Residents and landowners in the area objected to potential traffic congestion and construction of a roadway that required traffic intersection improvements. Those issues are resolved or still in review.

Many residents in the area feel the addition of the Amazon warehouse is going to drastically change the overall atmosphere of the community. Many believe the decision to lease and develop to one of the largest corporations in the world does not align with the original values of the airport and some say they are choosing profit over people.

Development of an Amazon.com last-mile distribution center at Jacksonville Executive at Craig Airport is “moving along quite rapidly,” Jacksonville Aviation Authority CEO Mark VanLoh told the JAA board March 25.

=== Aircraft ===
For the 12-month period ending February 7, 2018, the airport had 158,769 aircraft operations, an average of 435 per day: 85% general aviation, 9% military, and 5% air taxi. There were at the time 203 aircraft based at this airport: 127 single-engine and 45 multi-engine airplanes, 18 military, 8 helicopter, and 5 jet.

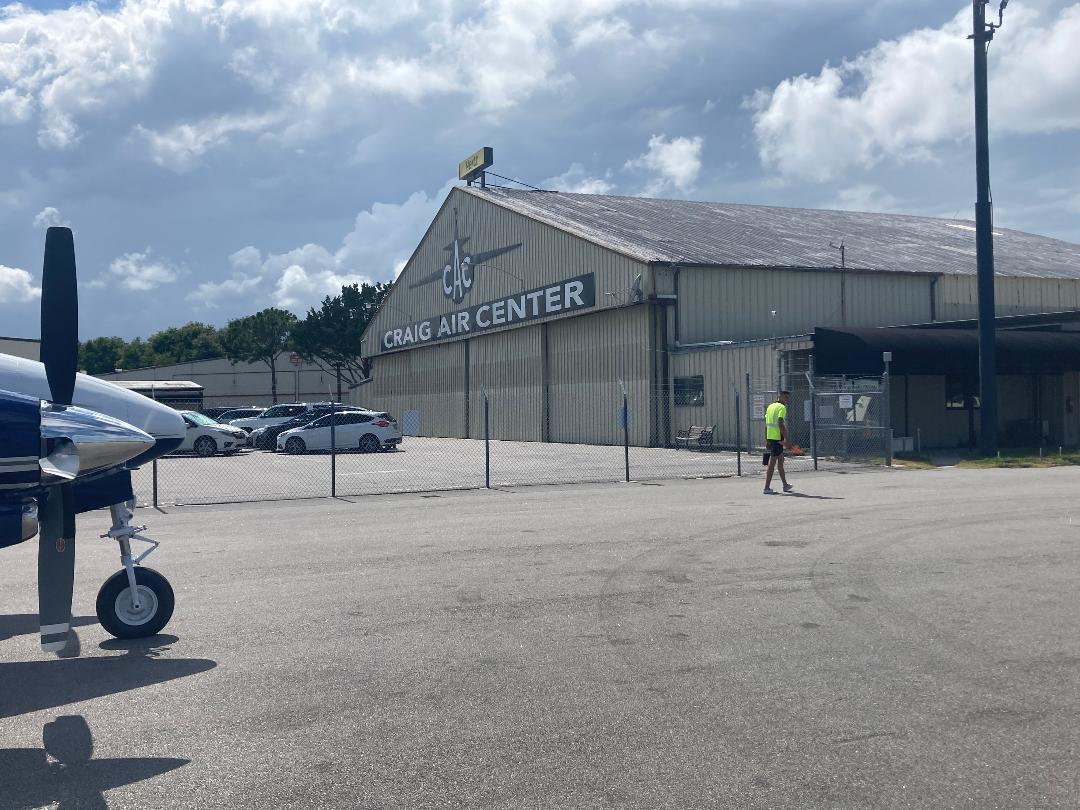
CRG Jacksonville FL Executive airport hangar

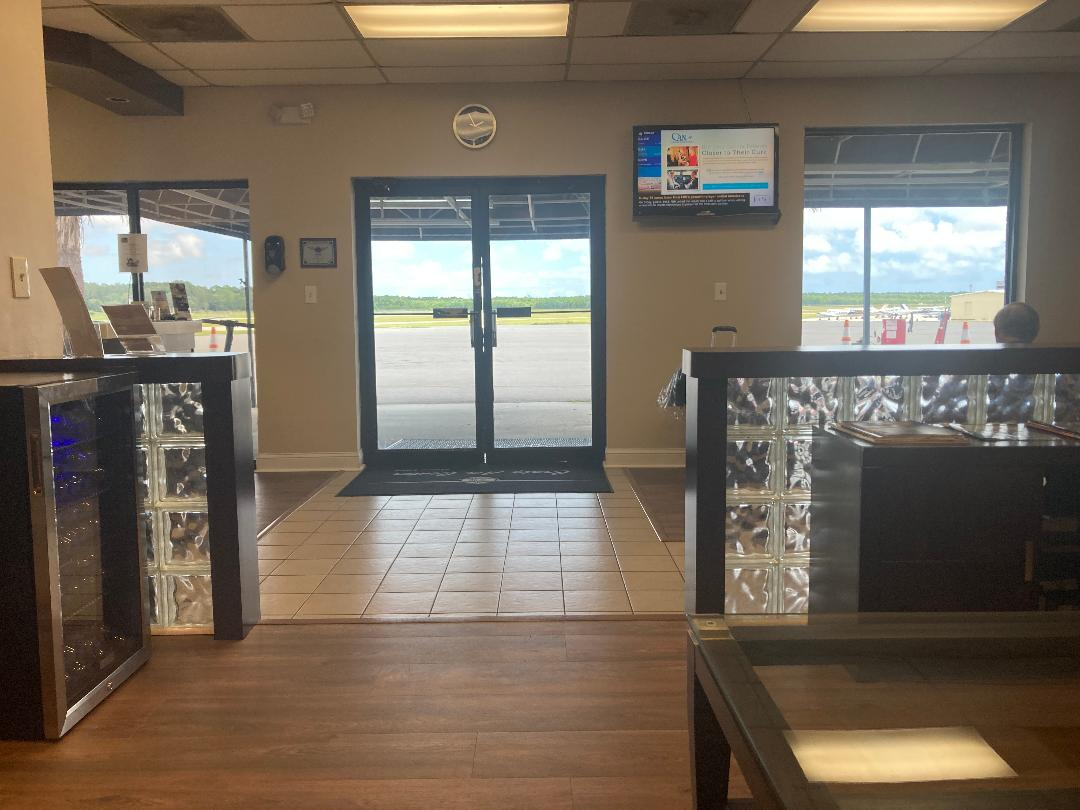
Jacksonville executive airport lobby area

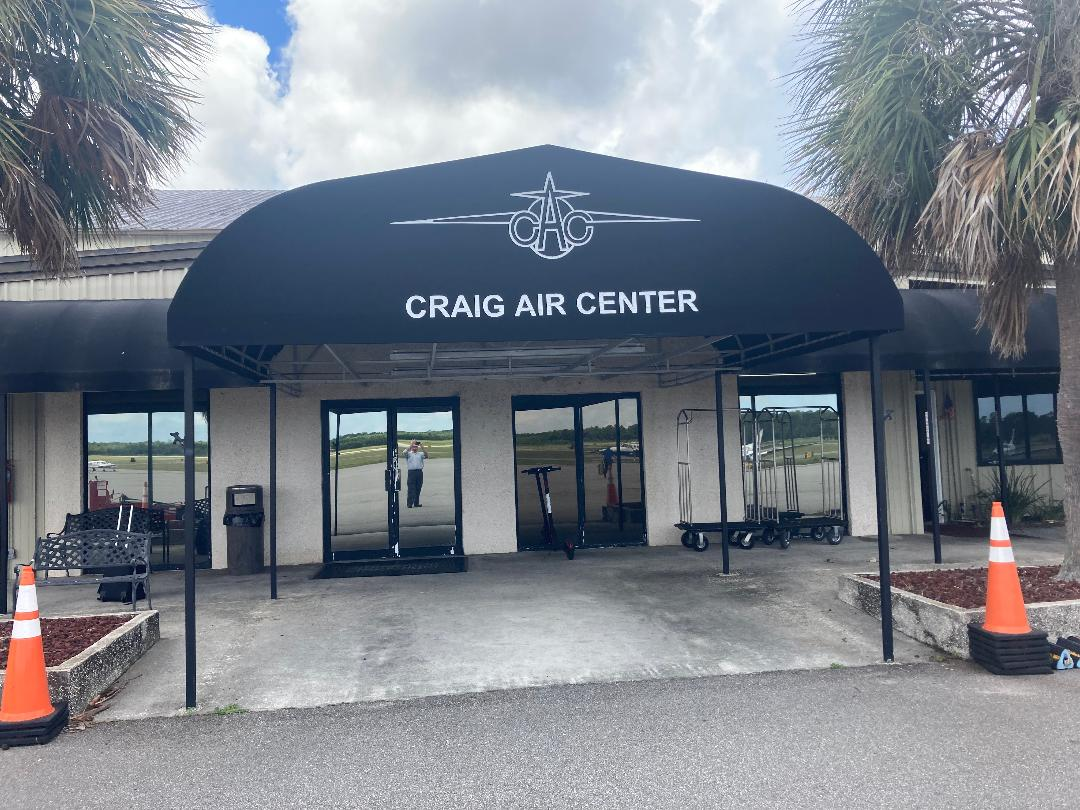
Jacksonville Executive airport lounge from tarmac

== Accidents and incidents ==
- On july 14, 1993, a Beech Baron crashed during takeoff at Craig Airport. The crash was caused by an explosion and fire from undetermined fuel and ignition sources in the left wing.
- On November 27, 2003, a Swearingen Merlin collided with trees while on approach to the Craig Airport. The pilot was advised of fog at his destination while he was still west of Tallahassee, and he decided to continue to Craig. The pilot descended below minimums and collided with trees and terrain.
- On January 12, 2005, a Beechcraft Super King Air overran the runway at the Craig Municipal Airport. The probable cause of the accident was found to be the pilot's failure to perform a missed approach after losing sight of the runway and the misjudgment of distance on the runway which resulted in an overrun.
- On March 10, 2005, a Cirrus SR20's nose gear detached during landing at the Jacksonville Executive Airport. The probable cause of the accident was found to be inadequate welding procedure by the manufacturer resulting in a poor weld of the nose landing gear and collapse of the nose landing gear during a porpoised landing.
- On June 4, 2006, a Cessna 421 sustained substantial damage during a gear-up landing at the Jacksonville Executive Airport. The pilot reported smelling smoke and feeling heat after departure; with nowhere straight ahead to land, he turned back to the airport. Because he thought the engine was on fire, the pilot landed gear-up in the dirt between the taxiway and runway. The cause of the smoke could not be determined.
- On December 8, 2013, a Cessna 310 crashed during an attempted missed approach at the Jacksonville Executive Airport. The three onboard died. The probable cause of the accident was found to be the pilot’s failure to maintain airplane control during a missed approach in night instrument meteorological conditions due to spatial disorientation and a lack of instrument proficiency.
- On April 23, 2015, a Beechcraft D95A Debonair was damaged during a gear-up landing at the Jacksonville Executive Airport.
- On December 11, 2016, two aircraft collided while taxiing on the ground at the Jacksonville Executive Airport.
- On February 20, 2018 a Cessna P210 Pressurized Centurion was damaged after a gear-up landing at the Jacksonville Executive Airport. Though an air traffic controller instructed the pilot to go around, the pilot declined to do so. Due to the distraction of the situation, the pilot forgot to extend his landing gear.
- On March 10, 2018, a Hughes 269A helicopter crashed while flying at the Jacksonville Executive Airport. The pilot aboard, who survived, was practicing autorotations. The probable cause of the accident was found to be the pilot's failure to maintain rotor rpm during a practice autorotation, which resulted in ground contact and a dynamic rollover.
- On December 16, 2020, an Embraer Phenom 100 had a runway excursion at the Jacksonville Executive Airport. The probable cause of the accident was found to be the flight crew's failure to apply maximum braking immediately upon touchdown, which resulted in a runway excursion.
- On September 1, 2022, a Rockwell Commander had a landing gear collapse at the Jacksonville Executive Airport.
- On March 16, 2023, a Piper Turbo Lance experienced a landing gear failure at the Jacksonville Executive Airport.

== See also ==
- List of airports in Florida
