= Jacksonville Aviation Authority =

- Agency logo
- Abbreviation: JAA
- Formation: 2001
- Type: agency
- Purpose: Serve the aviation needs of commercial, business, and recreational users
- Headquarters: Jacksonville, Florida, US
- Coordinates: 30.489251°N 81.673329°W
- Region served: City of Jacksonville, Northeast Florida, and Southeast Georgia
- CEO: Mark Vanloh
- Budget: $63.8 million
- Staff: 251
- Volunteers: 50+
- Website: www.flyjacksonville.com

The Jacksonville Aviation Authority (JAA) is the independent government agency that owns and operates the four airports of Jacksonville, Florida, United States. It was established in 2001 after being branched off of the Jacksonville Port Authority.

== History ==
Jacksonville airports were under the purview of the Port Authority since the Jacksonville Port Authority (JPA) was created by a special act of the Florida Legislature in 1963. Their charter directed the authority to develop, maintain, and market Jacksonville's port facilities while operating like a business. In May 2001, the Florida Legislature approved the restructuring of the Jacksonville Port Authority into two separate entities (City J-Bill-1104)—the Jacksonville Aviation Authority (JAA) and the Jacksonville Seaport Authority—effective October 1, 2001.

The JAA is controlled by a seven-member board of directors. Three of the members are appointed by the mayor of Jacksonville, and four are selected by the Florida governor. Board members are limited to two consecutive terms of four years. The board meets monthly in open meetings. Day-to-day operations are handled by a management team consisting of an executive director/CEO, a chief operating officer, and a chief financial officer.

== Airports ==
- Jacksonville International Airport is the major regional passenger air service provider, featuring non-stop flights to dozens of major US cities. The facility was opened in 1968 as a replacement for Imeson Field. A major renovation was begun in 2007.
- Jacksonville Executive at Craig Airport, also known as Jacksonville Executive Airport, is centrally located near Jacksonville's suburban business centers, and is a general aviation field used by corporate aircraft travelers and small aircraft. However, the 4,000-foot runways are considered small for jets, and plans to extend them have been opposed by nearby residents for years.
- Herlong Recreational Airport, on the city's west side, is a general aviation field and the primary site of recreational activity for private planes, gliders, ultralights, helicopters, and parachuting.
- Cecil Airport, the air station that the Navy closed in 1999 as part of the Military base closures of 1993, is located approximately 15 miles west of downtown Jacksonville. The newest addition to the Jacksonville airport system, Cecil Field is an integral component of the Cecil Commerce Center, and an ideal site for aviation maintenance, repair, and overhaul operations.

== Scope ==
Jacksonville's airport system, including the runways, hangars, terminal buildings, air cargo areas, airport grounds, and road connections to the public highway system is owned and maintained by JAA, which also manages their overall use. The airlines, rental car companies, and terminal concessionaires pay lease and rental fees to JAA for the right to operate out of the airport. This revenue funds the day-to-day operations so that public tax dollars are not required. For fiscal year 2010, they reported net income of $20.4 million and assets of $436.7 million.

=== Security ===
JAA also has its own airport security department that included 26 sworn officers in 2010. The JAA briefly considered disbanding its internal force in 2009, asking Sheriff John Rutherford for cost estimates if the Jacksonville Sheriff's Office began patrolling airport properties. The following year, the JAA board of directors chose to expand their own police department by hiring 9 more officers.

They also work together with the Transportation Security Administration, the Federal Aviation Administration, U.S. Immigration and Customs Enforcement, and the Drug Enforcement Administration to provide safe and secure facilities for all aviation users.

=== Volunteers ===
The Airport Ambassador Program is a service established in 1998. It is staffed by volunteers who provide information to travelers and directions around the airport facility. Beginning in 2009, Ambassadors began a project to hand out flowers to travelers on Valentine's Day and Mothers Day. On February 14, 2011, over a thousand red, white and pink carnations were given as a gesture of goodwill for Jacksonville.

=== Rebranding ===
2011 marked the 10th anniversary of the authority, which announced a major public relations campaign in late 2010 to bring attention to Jacksonville's airport system. The authority's logo was changed dramatically, as was the logo for all four airports, three of which were renamed.

- Herlong Airport → Herlong Recreational Airport
- Cecil Field → Cecil Airport
- Craig Municipal Airport → Jacksonville Executive at Craig Airport

The websites for all JAA entities were redesigned as well.
