= Cecil Airport =

- IATA: VQQ; ICAO: KVQQ; FAA LID: VQQ

Summary
- Airport type: Public
- Owner: Jacksonville Aviation Authority
- Operator: Jacksonville Aviation Authority
- Location: Jacksonville, Florida
- Elevation AMSL: 80 ft (24 m)
- Coordinates: 30°13′07″N 081°52′36″W
- Website: https://cecilspaceport.com/
- Interactive map of Cecil Airport

Runways
Direction	Length		Surface
Direction	ft	m	Surface
18L/36R	12,503	3,811	Asphalt/concrete
18R/36L	8,002	2,439	Asphalt/concrete
9R/27L	8,003	2,439	Asphalt/concrete
9L/27R	4,439	1,353	Asphalt/concrete

Helipads
Number	Length		Surface
Number	ft	m	Surface
H1	70	21	Concrete
H2	70	21	Concrete

Statistics (2018)
- Aircraft operations (year ending 2/5/2018): 104,361
- Based aircraft: 84
- Source: Federal Aviation Administration

Cecil Airport (IATA: VQQ, ICAO: KVQQ, FAA LID: VQQ) is a public airport and commercial spaceport located in Jacksonville, Florida, United States. It is owned by the Jacksonville Aviation Authority and services military aircraft, corporate aircraft, general aviation, and air cargo. The Florida Army National Guard's primary Army Aviation Support Facility and the U.S. Coast Guard's Helicopter Interdiction Tactical Squadron (HITRON) are also located here, the former operating CH-47 Chinook, UH-60 Blackhawk, UH-72 Lakota and C-12 Huron aircraft, and the latter operating the MH-65C Dolphin helicopter.

The airport has ARFF and structural fire protection provided by Jacksonville Fire/Rescue Station 56. Fire Station 73 (under construction) will be located on the airfield as well and will include ARFF, structural and rescue (ambulance) protection. A back-up, citywide 911 call/training center will also be located at Station 73.

In 2010, Cecil Airport became the United States' eighth licensed commercial spaceport and the first in Florida authorized to fly space vehicles that take off and land horizontally. As of 2025, the Jacksonville Aviation Authority has applied to certify the airport to allow space vehicles to land there as well.

The ~~NZC~~ identifier was the airport's previous FAA identifier when it was Naval Air Station Cecil Field, its former name until its closure as a naval air station in 1999. The NZC IATA code is now allocated to Maria Reiche Neuman Airport serving Nazca, Peru (IATA: NZC, ICAO: SPZA).

== History ==
The airport is located on the site of the former Naval Air Station Cecil Field, which opened in 1941 and closed in 1999 following the 1993 Base Realignment and Closure Commission decision. Covering a total area of 22,939 acres (92.83 km^{2}), it was the largest military base in the Jacksonville area and supported all Atlantic Fleet F/A-18 Hornet strike fighter squadrons and S-3 Viking sea control squadrons.

== Facilities and aircraft ==
=== Facilities ===
==== Runways ====
Cecil Airport covers an area of 6,082 acres (24.61 km^{2}) and contains four runways and two helipads:

- Runway 18L/36R: 12,503 ft × 200 ft (3,811 m × 61 m), surface: asphalt/concrete
- Runway 18R/36L: 8,002 ft × 200 ft (2,439 m × 61 m), surface: asphalt/concrete
- Runway 9R/27L: 8,003 ft × 200 ft (2,439 m × 61 m), surface: asphalt/concrete
- Runway 9L/27R: 4,439 ft × 200 ft (1,353 m × 61 m), surface: asphalt/concrete
- H1: 70 ft × 70 ft (21 m × 21 m), surface: concrete
- H2: 70 ft × 70 ft (21 m × 21 m), surface: concrete

==== FBOs ====
The airport has a fixed-base operator that sells fuel. It offers services such as catering, hangars, courtesy cars, and rental cars; there are also amenities such as internet, conference rooms, vending machines, a crew lounge, and showers.

==== Private entities ====
Cecil Airport houses the FSCJ (Florida State College Jacksonville) aviation course hangar and associated training aircraft. Sunrise Aviation, a flight training school and pilot supplies vendor is the flight training provider for FSCJ's aviation program. Facilities operated by major aerospace firms such as Logistic Services International (LSI), Boeing and Flightstar Aircraft Services are also located at Cecil, providing major training, maintenance and overhaul services for a variety of U.S. military aircraft.

In September 2024, ground broke on a new testing facility for hypersonic aircraft. The company running the facility aims to develop an aircraft that could travel from New York to London in 90 minutes.

=== Aircraft ===
For the 12-month period ending February 5, 2018, the airport had 104,361 aircraft operations, an average of 286 per day: 52% military, 47% general aviation, <1% air carrier, and <1% air taxi. There were 84 aircraft based at this airport: 69 military, 12 single-engine, 1 multi-engine, 1 jet, and 1 helicopter.

== Accidents and incidents ==
- On July 1, 2002, a Piper PA-22 Pacer crashed during a touch-and-go at the Cecil Airport. The probable cause of the accident was found to be the failure of the solo student/owner to maintain directional control of the airplane during takeoff in a crosswind, which resulted in the airplane veering off the runway, a collision with a runway light, and a ground loop.
- On July 31, 2014, a Piper PA-44 Seminole experienced a nose gear collapse while landing at the Cecil airport.
- On June 9, 2025, a Delta Air Lines Boeing 757 bound from Atlanta to Orlando made an emergency landing at Cecil due to a "pressurization issue."

== See also ==
- List of airports in Florida
