= Charlwood (name) =

Charlwood is a given name and surname. Notable people with the name include:

- Alexander Charlwood (1888–1974), English cricketer
- Charlwood Lawton (1660–1721), English lawyer and pamphleteer
- Charles Charlwood (1842–1880), English cricketer
- Don Charlwood (1915–2012), Australian author
- Henry Charlwood (1846–1888), English cricketer
- John Charlwood (1871–1923), English cricketer
- U. Gary Charlwood (born 1941), German-born Canadian businessman

== See also ==
- Charlwood, Surrey, England
- Charlwood (disambiguation)
