= Lewton =

Lewton is a surname. Notable people with the name include:

- Frederick Lewis Lewton (1874–1959), American botanist and museum curator
- Steve Lewton (born 1983), English professional golfer
- Val Lewton (1904–1951), Russian-American novelist, film producer and screenwriter
- Val Lewton (visual artist) (1937–2015), American painter and museum exhibition designer

Other uses:

- Lewton (Discworld), a fictional character in the Discworld novel series
- in a movie, the Lewton-bus effect, introduced by Jacques Tourneur and named after Val Lewton, was the other name of the jump scare

== See also ==
- Lawton (surname)
