= Lawton (surname) =

Lawton is a surname. Notable people with the surname include:

- Alexander Lawton (1818–1896), division commander in the American Civil War
- April Lawton (1948–2006), American musician and graphic designer
- Barbara Lawton (born 1951), American politician
- Ben Lawton (1922–1987), American surgeon and healthcare activist
- Brian Lawton (born 1965), American ice hockey player
- Charlwood Lawton (1660–1721), radical British lawyer turned Jacobite
- Edward Thaddeus Lawton (1913–1966), American-born Catholic bishop in Nigeria
- Emma Lawton (born 2001), Scottish footballer
- Esther Christian Lawton (1910–1998), Civil servant and women's rights activist
- Sir Frederick Lawton (judge) (1911–2001), English judge
- Geoff Lawton (born 1954), Australian permaculturist
- Harold Lawton (1899–2005), British scholar
- Harry Lawton (1927–2005), American author and novelist
- Hattie Lawton (1837–?), American detective and Civil War spy
- Henry Ware Lawton (1843–1899), US Army officer
- J. F. Lawton (born 1960), American writer, producer and director
- James Lawton (1943–2018), British sports journalist
- Jimmy Lawton (born 1942), English footballer
- John William Magarey Lawton (born 1939) Australian immunologist in Hong Kong
- Sir John Lawton (biologist) (born 1943), British scientist and chair of the Royal Commission on Environmental Pollution
- John Lawton (footballer) (1936–2017), English footballer
- John Lawton (musician) (1946–2021), British rock and roll singer
- Joseph Lawton (1857–1934), New Zealand cricketer
- Kayne Lawton (born 1989), Australian Rugby League player
- Lancelot Lawton (1880–1947), British historian, military officer, scholar of Ukrainian studies
- Larry Lawton (born 1961), American ex-con motivational speaker
- Linda Lawton British cyanobacteria and water safety researcher
- Matt Lawton (born 1971), American baseball player
- Robert M. Lawton (1931–2021), American businessman and politician
- Russ Lawton, American drummer
- Scott Lawton (conductor) (born 1960), American conductor
- Stefanie Lawton (born 1980), Canadian curler
- Tina Lawton (1944–1968), South Australian folk singer
- Tommy Lawton (1919–1996), English footballer
- Captain Wilbur Lawton (1879–1917), pseudonym of author John Henry Goldfrap
- Will Lawton (born 1974), British musician

== See also ==
- Corinne Lawton Mackall (1880–1955), American painter, humanitarian, and gardener

== See also ==
- Laughton (disambiguation)
