= Peter Thomas =

Peter Thomas may refer to:

== Sportspeople ==
- Pete Thomas (American football) (born 1991), American football player
- Peter Thomas (footballer, born 1932), Welsh footballer
- Peter Thomas (footballer, born 1944) (1944–2023), Irish international footballer
- Peter Thomas (footballer, born 2004), English footballer
- Peter Thomas (cricketer, born 1952), English cricketer
- Peter Thomas (cricketer, born 1964), English cricketer
- Peter Thomas (Grenadian cricketer) (born 1954), West Indian cricketer
- Peter Thomas (rower) (born 1945), British rower

== Musicians ==
- Pete Thomas (drummer) (born 1954), English
- Pete Thomas (saxophonist), English musician, music producer and composer
- Peter Thomas (composer) (1925–2020), German composer and arranger
- Peter Thomas (musician), American pop songwriter, producer and singer

== Others ==
- Petrus Thomae (c. 1280 – c. 1340), Franciscan philosopher
- Peter Thomas, Baron Thomas of Gwydir (1920–2008), Welsh Conservative politician
- Peter Thomas (announcer) (1924–2016), American narrator of television programs
- Peter Thomas (political theorist) (c. 1973–2026), Australian political theorist and professor
- Peter Thomas (saint) (1305–1366), Latin Patriarch of Constantinople
- Peter H. Thomas (born 1938), Canadian entrepreneur, author, public speaker and educator
- Peter R. Thomas (born 1954), American artist, author, and papermaker
- Peter James Thomas (born 1961), British entrepreneur and academic
- Petrus Thomas (politician), MP for Koroba-Kopiago District, Papua New Guinea
- Peter K. Thomas (1914–1990), American teacher of restorative dentistry
- Peter M. Thomas, American attorney, businessman and banker
- Peter Thomas (businessman) (1943–2023), Welsh businessman
- Peter Thomas (pilot) (born c. 1958), British pilot and flight instructor
