= Lawton =

Lawton may refer to:

== Places ==
- Lawton, Alberta, Canada
- Lawton, Havana, a neighborhood in Diez de Octubre, Havana City, Cuba
- Lawton Avenue, a major thoroughfare in Fort Bonifacio, Metro Manila, Philippines
- Lawton, Herefordshire, a hamlet in England
- Lawton, Shropshire, a hamlet in England
- Lawton railway station, formerly at Lawton-gate, near Church Lawton
- Church Lawton, a small village and civil parish (sometimes known as Lawton) in Cheshire, England
- Plaza Lawton, Manila, Philippines

=== United States ===
- Lawton, Indiana
- Lawton, Iowa
- Lawton, Kansas
- Lawton, Michigan
- Lawton, North Dakota
- Lawton, Oklahoma
- Lawton, Pennsylvania
- Lawton, West Virginia, an unincorporated community in Fayette County
- Lawton, Wisconsin
- Lawton's Mill, a historic mill in Exeter, Rhode Island
- Lawton Place Historic District, a historic district on Lawton Place in Waltham, Massachusetts
- Lawton-Almy-Hall Farm, an historic farm in Portsmouth, Rhode Island on the National Register of Historic Places

== People ==
- Lawton (surname)
- Lawton (given name)
- Oscar Lawton Wilkerson (1926–2023), American pilot

== See also ==
- Lawtons, a Canadian drug store
- Lawtons, New York, USA; a hamlet
- Rural Municipality of Lawtonia No. 135
- Laughton (disambiguation)
