= Los Desterrados =

Sephardic-flamenco band

Los Desterrados was a Sephardic-flamenco band active in London between 2000 and 2019, who arranged original songs of the Jewish Sephardic diaspora, including from Turkey, Morocco and Greece, using instruments such as oud, flamenco guitar, saz, violin, flute and bass, singing in Ladino. They were nominated for a Songlines award in 2009.

== Recordings ==
Los Desterrados recorded four albums, Dos Amantes (2013), Miradores (2008), Tu (2006) and Por Dos Levanim (2001). Tu was included in The Wire's top 50 recordings for 2006.

== Performances ==
They performed at venues and festivals around London and the UK, including at Womad in 2009 and live on the BBC Radio 3 World Routes in 2013. They supported Spiers & Boden at The Spitz in 2006.
