= Samuel Spearing =

African-American politician

Florida Senate
- Incumbent
- Assumed office 1874

Samuel Spearing (born 1823/3) was a black American politician who was enslaved in 1853. He served in the Florida Senate during the Reconstruction era. He represented Duval County in the state senate in 1874. According to one source he was known as Uncle Sam. He also served as a collector of revenue.

Spearing represented the 18th district in the State Senate.

== Early life and slavery ==
Samuel Spearing was born somewhere along South Carolina or Georgia. He spent time learning the fundamentals of reading and numbers before being enslaved for $1,800 to Elisha Greene. He worked on a plantation in Baker County. Samuel established a close relationship with Elisha, and became literate through the teachings of the Green family. After the American Civil War ended, Elisha advised Samuel to move to Jacksonville where he began his political career. At Elisha's death, Samuel was telegraphed. Samuel then travelled by train to dig Elisha's grave and write his obituary. In the obituary Samuel wrote, "Who regrets he is not able to do justice to the friendship which sprung up between master and servant".

== Careers ==
In Jacksonville, Samuel spent his time working through several positions. His first notable government jobs was as a Justice of the Peace in Duval County and Councilmen and Treasurer for LaVilla from 1871 to 1887. Samuel was then nominated by the Republican Party as Duval County's Representative in 1874. After the military withdrew from Florida, Black representatives, including Samuel Spear, began being voted out of office. He opened a grocery business on Bay Street in Jacksonville in 1876. In 1884, Samuel was elected officer of the Grand Lodge of Florida.

== Political activism ==
=== LaVilla ===
Samuel Spearing had significant political contributions to LaVilla while he lived there. A significant black community, Samuel spoke about equal rights for freedmen. He criticized the lack of recognition that enslaved people had of creating the land:

"How did they get the land and the wealth, who cleared off the very land upon which Jacksonville stands? It was done by the bone and the sinew of the colored man, and we have an equal title to enjoy and govern it."

Samuel was a part of the Radical Union Republican Club which gathered black citizens for mass meetings. Samuel was also a part of the Trustees of the Florida Institute in 1868, a group in charge of establishing the first school built by freedman in LaVilla.

=== Party alignment ===
Samuel was nominated by the Republican Party. He gained the support of the Conservative Republican Party, Independents, and some Democrats and Ex-Confederates.

== See also ==
- African American officeholders from the end of the Civil War until before 1900
