= Richmond Hotel =

Historic building in Jacksonville, Florida, U.S.

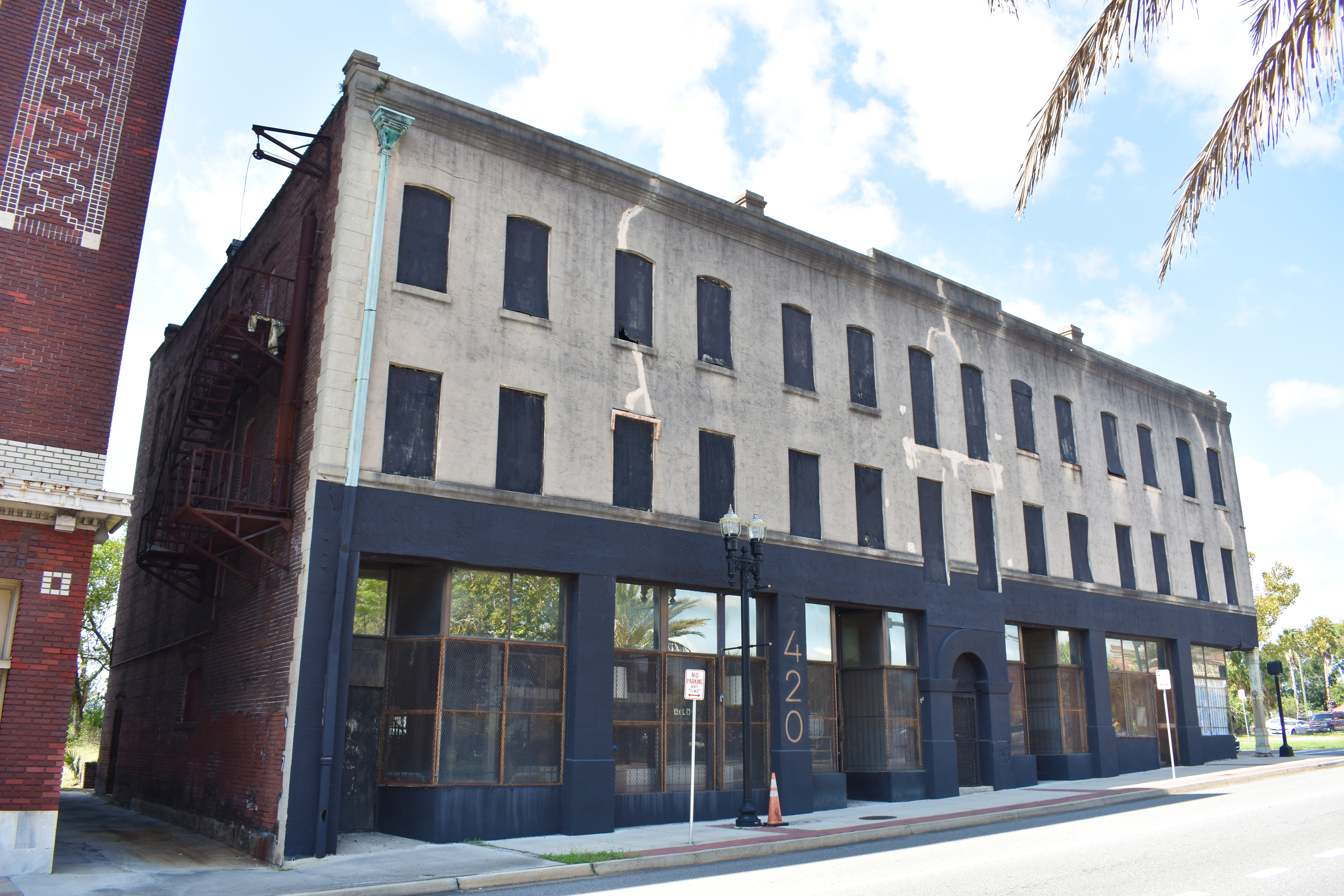
- Interactive map of the Richmond Hotel area
- Former names: Edgemont Hotel, DeLoach Furniture

General information
- Type: Hotel
- Location: 420 N Broad Street, Jacksonville, Florida, United States
- Coordinates: 30.331071°N 81.664367°W
- Current tenants: Delo Studios
- Completed: 1909

The Richmond Hotel is a historic building located in the LaVilla neighborhood of Jacksonville, Florida. The building was originally built in 1909 as a hotel for Black patrons. Following desegregation, the hotel closed in 1969. As of 2018, the ground-level area of the Richmond Hotel is occupied by Delo Studios.

== Summary ==
The Richmond Hotel is situated on the corner of N Broad Street and West Church Street, adjacent to the Duval County Courthouse. It is located in the northwest quadrant of Downtown. Specifically the hotel can be found in the northwest corner of the LaVilla neighborhood, a historic African-American neighborhood that is east of I-95 and south of W Union Street.

The Richmond Hotel is a 3-story structure, situated on .22 acres of land. There is now a .07-acre lot behind the building. The entire building spans 17,620 square feet. The second story balcony could be used to oversee the street below.

Jacksonville's Architectural Heritage cites a 1942 magazine describing the Richmond Hotel as an:

"[O]utstanding hotel for colored people in Jacksonville...[located] close to all principal Negro businesses, theaters, and churches, and less than five minutes drive from the railroad terminal. Most of its 38 rooms have running water, with many bathrooms adjacent. The Richmond Hotel boasts a quiet, homelike atmosphere. A Tea Room is operated for the convenience of guests" (p. 97).

== History ==
Originally built in 1909, the Richmond Hotel operated as the hub for prominent black residents and celebrities to stay during the time. At the time it was the only black-only hotel in the area. Compared to other segregated places, the Richmond Hotel was of a premier quality at the time. It was a popular destination at the time for famous African-American artists such as Cab Calloway, Duke Ellington, Ella Fitzgerald, and Billie Holiday.

As a result of desegregation, the hotel closed its doors to the public in 1969. Thereafter, it was utilized for retail purposes. Following the forlorn times of segregation, the hotel's business progressively died to the point where it is now essentially abandoned. For some time throughout the 70s and 80s, various retail stores were placed on the ground-level floor of the building. The upper two levels were reserved as boarding houses rented out to locals.

Perhaps the most popular retail store located in the hotel was the DeLoach Furniture Co., a family-owned furniture store that served Jacksonville for over 90 years prior to its closing in the mid 2010s.

Throughout the 1990s, demolition derby parties were held throughout the Downtown area, including LaVilla. While The Blue Chip (another hotel for African-American guests in LaVilla) did not survive demolition, the Richmond Hotel did. The former site of the Blue Chip is now a vacant lot.

Currently, the Richmond Hotel operates under the name Delo Studios, a multi-use space for meetings and events, galleries, and photography studios.

== Features ==
=== Harlem of the South ===
Throughout the 1920s until the 1960s, LaVilla was known as the "Harlem of the South" due to its bursting creativity. The neighborhood was notorious for its many theaters such as the Ritz Theatre, the Strande Theatre, and the Roosevelt Theatre. Likewise, many nightclubs and diners lit up the streets after dark, including Hayes Luncheonette, Mama's Restaurant, Nick's Pool Parlor, and Manuel's Taproom. When guests would come to visit the theaters and clubs, they would stay in nearby hotels, such as the Richmond Hotel (renamed Egmont Hotel) and Hotel de Dreme (renamed in the 1920s as the Wynn Hotel).

The most prominent area of LaVilla for bohemians was Ashley Street. Due to the Richmond Hotel's location to Ashley Street, the hotel was once a popular place to stay for many famous and affluent people.

=== The Great Fire of 1901 ===
It is possible that the success of the Richmond Hotel (and more largely, Ashley Street) can be attributed to the Great Fire of 1901. On May 3, 1901, a fire erupted in LaVilla, lasting 8 hours and burning up 146 city blocks. The fire destroyed over 2,300 buildings and left nearly 10,000 residents without homes.

The fire began at a candle factory on the corner of Ashley and Davis Streets, spreading to the St. Johns River.

James Weldon Johnson, a principal of a local school claimed that local firemen only attempted to save white neighborhoods, leaving the prominently black portions of town in flames:

"We met many people fleeing. From them we gathered excitedly related snatches: the fiber factory catches afire - the fire department comes - fanned by a light breeze, the fire is traveling directly east and spreading out to the north, over the district where the bulk of Negroes in the western end of the city live - the firemen spend all their efforts saving a low row of frame houses just across the street on the south side of the factory, belonging to a white man named Steve Melton."

After the fire ended, multiple noted architects helped to rebuild the city. Henry J. Klutho of New York was significant in the redevelopment of the downtown area, though he is not attributed to the Richmond Hotel. Due to reconstruction efforts by those like Klutho, various apartments buildings, office spaces, churches, and libraries were built throughout LaVilla and the surrounding downtown neighborhoods.
