= Jacksonville and LaVilla Street Railway =

Railway in Florida

The Jacksonville and LaVilla Street Railway was a railway formed on Wednesday, April 16, 1884, by William L'Engle, Jas Marion and John Hartridge, to better connect what were independent cities. The Charter gave the company:

Power to construct, equip and operate, with steam, horse, or other power one or more lines of street railway in the County of Duval, in the State of Florida, within the corporate limits of the cities of Jacksonville and La Villa and their vincinage,'said railroad to be first laid down Bay Street from Bridge Street to Market Street, thence up Market Street to Duval, thence along Duval Street to Hogan Street, thence down Hogan Street to Bay Street, and the municipal corporation bestows upon the company the power to construct a street railway along Hogan Street.

Construction moved rapidly and the line was opened on January 24, 1885, to a huge celebration. From Bay and Newnan, the tracks ran North on Newnan to Adams and hence to Broad Street at about the intersection of the current Adams and Myrtle Streets. The little car line was bought out by Henry Plant's much larger Jacksonville Street Railway in 1886 and much of its route east of Broad Street was taken up and a new route was laid up Broad from Bay to Monroe.

At that point it was fully merged into the larger company.
