= LaVilla Museum =

Museum in Jacksonville, Florida

Coordinates: 30.33516°N 81.66717°W

The LaVilla Museum is a museum of African American history and culture located in the 1929 Ritz Theater in Jacksonville, Florida. The museum opened in 1999.

The museum documents the culture and history of people of African descent (most slaves, some free, and not all Americans) in northeast Florida prior to that territory's entry as a U.S. state in 1845, as well as LaVilla neighborhood of downtown Jacksonville (which was once a large and thriving African American community). LaVilla was home to so many poets, artists, musicians, authors, and playwrights that it was known as "the Harlem of the South". The Ritz Theatre is one of the few remaining buildings in the LaVilla neighborhood. Although most of the 600-seat theatre was razed in the 1990s, the northwest corner is original to the building.

The highlight of the museum tour are two animatronic representations of James Weldon Johnson and J. Rosamond Johnson, LaVilla natives who composed the famous song, "Lift Every Voice and Sing". Rooms in the building evoke African American life throughout the 20th century by recreating a typical home living room, a Christian church, a barber shop, and a school room.

== See also ==
- List of museums focused on African Americans
