= U. Gary Charlwood =

Canadian businessman

- Born: Uwe Heinrich Gustav Schremer; December 25, 1941 (age 84); Germany
- Other name: Uwe Gary Charlwood
- Education: University of Southampton
- Occupations: Executive Chairman of The Charlwood Pacific Group; Executive Chairman of Century 21 Canada LP; Executive Chairman of Centum Financial Group Inc. Executive Chairman of Real Property Management LP; Vice-Chairman of Century 21 Asia Pacific; Chairman of UNIGLOBE Travel International LP
- Children: Christopher Charlwood; Martin Charlwood; Bianca Charlwood

U. Gary Charlwood (born 1941) is a Canadian businessman, Executive Chairman and CEO of Charlwood Pacific Group, Founder & Executive Chairman of CENTURY 21 Canada, and Chairman CEO & Founder of Uniglobe Travel International. In 2017, Charlwood was ranked as the 92nd richest person in Canada. In 2015, Charlwood was named The Most Powerful Person in Residential Real Estate by the Swanepoel Power 200.

== Early life and education ==
Born in Germany, he moved to London in 1948 to join his mother, who had remarried after his father's death. Later he attended University of Southampton.

== Career ==
Charlwood serves as the executive chairman of Charlwood Pacific Group, which owns Century 21 Canada, Century 21 Asia-Pacific, Uniglobe Travel International, Centum Financial Group and Real Property Management Canada. These companies have more than 1,700 franchise locations with more than 26,000 support staff in 561 cities in 67 countries, making it one of the largest international franchise systems in Canada, reportedly by REM (magazine).

He established UNIGLOBE Travel International in 1979, which is one of the largest travel agencies in number of outlets in the world.

In 1975 U. Gary along with Peter H. Thomas bought the franchise rights for Century 21 Real Estate Canada. But unfortunately, the Century 21 concept was shut down by the Real Estate Council of BC, as it was claimed that franchising was illegal in the real estate brokerage business. Charlwood challenged the ruling in court and won, following which he successfully opened the door to a wide array of American brokerages now commonplace in Canada, including RE/MAX, Coldwell Banker and, more recently, Royal LePage. CENTURY 21 Canada was the first real estate brokerage company with offices coast to coast in Canada. Currently, Century 21 remains one of the largest companies in Canada with more than 400 locations and 10,000 system members. The Charlwood Pacific Group also holds 50% ownership in Century 21 Asia Pacific. His Canadian and Asian Century 21 companies have a combined 939 franchisees, employing 19000 salespeople as of June 2016.

In 2002, he founded Centum, a mortgage brokerage franchise brand. His Canadian and Asian Century 21 companies have a combined 939 franchisees, employing 19,000 salespeople, as of June 2016.,

In 2010, he acquired the Real Property Management (RPM) rights for Canada, a Utah based company which manages properties for real estate investors.

Before starting his own company, Charlwood also worked for Western Airlines (now Delta Air Lines) and CP Air (now Air Canada).

He was elected as Chairman of the International Franchise Association of Washington, DC, the only non-American to ever hold the position.

== Awards and recognition ==
- Charlwood Pacific Group received the Canadian Franchise Association Hall of Fame Award in 2016.
- He was included in the Swanepoel Power 200 list for 2014-15 as #80th Most Powerful Person in Residential Real Estate.
- He was inducted to the Hall of Fame by the American Society of Travel Agents (ASTA) in 2009.
- He was inductee to the International Franchise Association Hall of Fame in 2007.
- Received 1991 Entrepreneur of the Year by International Franchise Association

== See also ==
- List of Canadians by net worth
- List of Canadians
