= Charlwood (disambiguation) =

Charlwood is a village in Surrey, England.

Charlwood may also refer to:

- Charlwood (name), a surname and given name
- Charlwood, Hampshire, a hamlet in Hampshire, England
- Charlwood, Queensland, a locality in the Scenic Rim Region, Queensland, Australia
- Charlwood House, a country house in West Sussex, England
