= Eartha M. M. White =

American humanitarian, philanthropist, and businesswoman

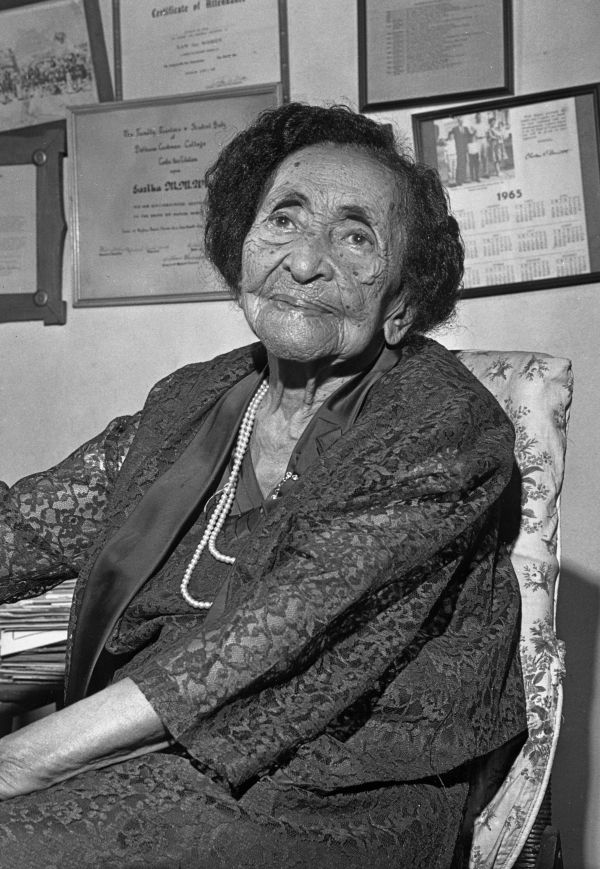
- Eartha M.M. White
- Born: November 8, 1876; Jacksonville, Florida
- Died: January 18, 1974 (aged 97); Jacksonville, Florida
- Occupations: Teacher, Operatic soprano, political activist
- Known for: Humanitarian works

Eartha Mary Magdalene White (November 8, 1876 – January 18, 1974) was an American humanitarian, philanthropist, and businesswoman.

== Early life ==
Born in Jacksonville, Florida, White was the 13th child of a former slave. She was adopted by Clara English White at a very young age and the two had an extremely loving relationship. It was from her mother's example that White sought to improve the condition of the poor and helpless people in Jacksonville.

In her youth, White attended schools in Florida and New York. In 1893, upon graduation from the Stanton School in Jacksonville, she moved to New York City for a brief period in order to avoid a yellow fever quarantine.

After high school, she attended the Madam Hall Beauty School and the National Conservatory of Music. She also toured in John W. Isham's Oriental America, a show featuring African-American's singing arias and popular operatic scenes, where she sang as a lyric soprano. The show traveled throughout the United States and Europe and launched many careers. She returned to Florida in 1896, where she graduated from the Florida Baptist Academy.

== Adult life ==
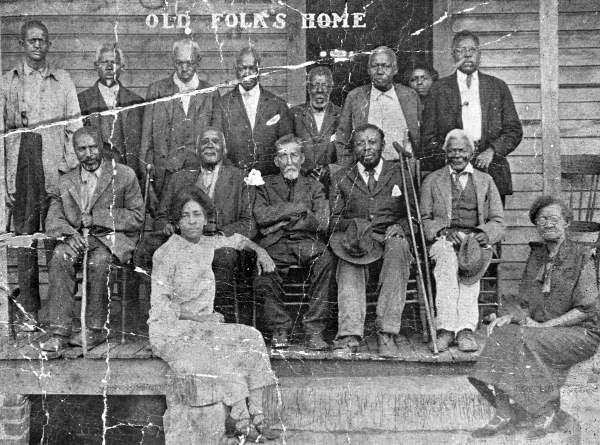
Eartha Mary Magdalene White (sitting on the left) and residents of the Clara White Old Folks Home

After graduation, White fought for construction of the first public school for African-Americans in the community of Bayard. In 1899, Bartolo Genovar was persuaded by Ms. White to donate land and lumber for a new school when she was assigned to teach there. Thus began a sixteen-year teaching career in Bayard and later at her alma mater, the Stanton School. She also became involved in political activities by participating in the Republican Party as well as beginning the Colored Citizens Protective League in Jacksonville. In 1941, she joined with A. Philip Randolph to protest job discrimination. White was engaged to marry at age 20, but her fiancé, who worked for a railroad in Jacksonville, died from tuberculosis in 1896.

She remained single, lived frugally, and spent all her money on a wide range of philanthropic activities. When asked about her social life, Eartha responded, "I never married. I was too busy - What man would put up with me running around the way I do?" Eartha White interacted with and became acquainted with individuals throughout Jacksonville and, by extension, Florida's African American community. In addition to local friends she made while engaged in philanthropic work in Jacksonville, she formed notable friendships with influential figures, including Charles Edward Bennett, Booker T. Washington, Mary McLeod Bethune, James Weldon Johnson and first lady Eleanor Roosevelt.

Eartha White helped the Jacksonville community through the Clara White Mission (CWM) during racial segregation and African-Americans were the primary beneficiaries of her work. Eartha's mother, Clara White, died in 1920, but Eartha continued their "mission work", and at the height of the Great Depression the operation grew so large, it had to be moved from its residential location. Eartha White obtained the closed Globe Theatre Building on West Ashley Street, and the facility was dedicated in her mother's memory. The CWM was the only non-profit organization serving daily meals to the needy in Jacksonville.

Eartha's other endeavors included establishing Mercy (tuberculosis) Hospital, the Boy's Improvement Club (to reduce delinquency), establishing Oakland Park (the first public park in Jacksonville for African Americans), a halfway house for alcoholics in recovery, a program for released prisoners to help re-enter society, a comprehensive maternity program with a home for unwed mothers, an orphanage and an adoption agency, and a child care center.

In 1902, Eartha and her mother began the "Colored Old Folks Home", which became the "Eartha White Nursing Home", and is now called "Eartha M. M. White Health Care, Inc.", a 125-bed, $780,000 facility, begun when Eartha was 89.

In 1970 she was awarded the Lane Bryant Award for Volunteer Service and was appointed to the President's National Center for Voluntary Action in 1971. At a reception at the White House with President Nixon, she was asked how she would spend her cash award. "I've already decided I want it to serve humanity. What would I do with it? Sit around the Plaza Hotel? I'm too busy." Florida Governor Reubin Askew honored her at age 95 as Florida’s Outstanding Senior Citizen.

Eartha White died of heart failure at age ninety-seven on January 18, 1974. She was designated a Great Floridian by the Florida Department of State in the Great Floridians 2000 Program. A plaque attesting to the honor is located at the Clara White Mission.

== Collections ==
Eartha White's private collection of photographs, correspondence, and historical documents was split, after her death, between the University of North Florida's Thomas G. Carpenter Library Special Collections and the Clara White Mission. Both groups of items may be viewed by the public.

The Eartha M.M. White Memorial Art and Historical Resource Center was dedicated on December 17, 1978, and contains most of her furniture, objets d'art and possessions. The "museum" is located on the second floor of the original Clara White Mission building in downtown Jacksonville.
