= Clara White Mission =

Non-profit organization

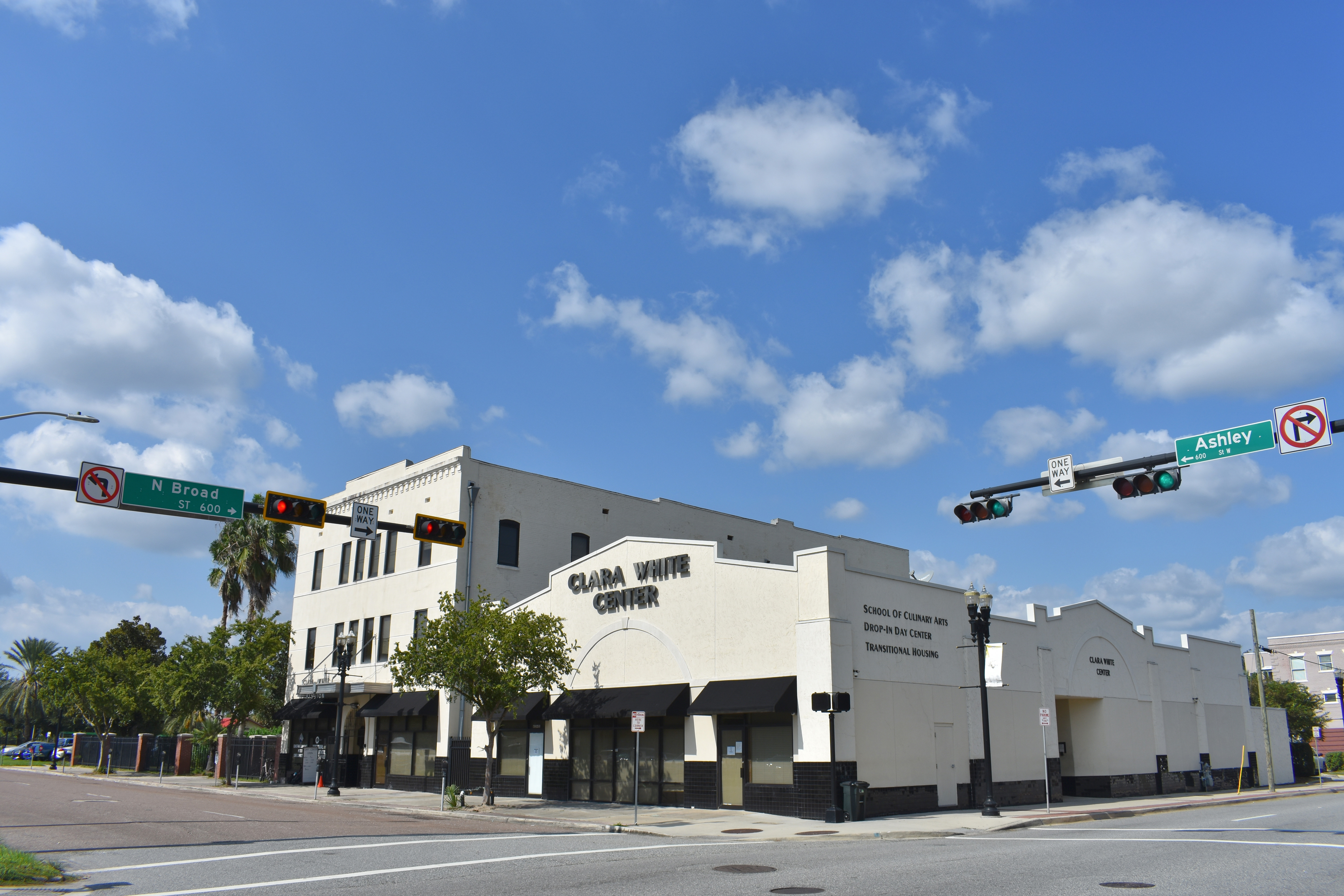
- Clara White Mission in 2020
- Formation: 1904
- Type: NGO
- Legal status: Foundation
- Headquarters: (United States) Jacksonville, Florida
- Region served: Duval County, Florida
- President/CEO: Ju’Coby Pittman-Peele
- Main organ: Board of Directors
- Budget: US$ 1,391,512 (2007)
- Website: www.clarawhitemission.org

The Clara White Mission (CWM) is a non-profit organization in Jacksonville, Florida, USA, founded by Dr. Eartha M. M. White that advocates for the poor and provides social services. According to its website, "The Clara White Mission is to reduce homelessness through advocacy, housing, job training and employment by partnering with business and local community resources." CWM has created an extensive and diverse network of public and private funding sources.

== History ==
The Clara White Mission was formally founded in 1904, but White began feeding hungry people in her Clay Street neighborhood in the 1880s. Between 1900 and 1950, Dr. Eartha M. M. White, a nationally recognized humanitarian who was Clara's daughter, turned the soup kitchen into an effective social agency.

Clara White died in 1920, but Eartha continued the "mission work" and, at the height of the Great Depression, the operation grew so large that it had to be moved from its residential location. The Globe Theatre had been closed for years, and Eartha White was able to purchase it. The West Ashley Street building was then dedicated to her mother's memory. At the time, the CWM was the only non-profit organization in Jacksonville serving daily meals to the needy. The mission was incorporated in 1934.

The Clara White Mission was Eartha's home for over 40 years and the center of her activities. Besides the original feeding program, the building was the centre of a myriad of projects and initiatives over the years. The Works Progress Administration (WPA) used the mission as the work site for sewing and arts projects during the Depression; the building's top floors housed soldiers stationed in Jacksonville during World War II.

Beginning with Clara and continuing with Eartha, the mission provided rooms to prisoners after their release from jail. They were also fed, given clothing and assistance in finding a job. The homeless received similar assistance.

The mission provided hands-on training for cooking/canning and business skills including typing, in addition to Braille instruction. The facility was renovated in 1946 and local business owners were encouraged to lease office space on the building's first and third floors to help pay the bills.

In 1902, Eartha and Clara White began the "Colored Old Folks Home", which became the "Eartha White Nursing Home". In 1965, construction began on Eartha M. M. White Health Care, Inc., a 125-bed, $780,000.00 facility, initiated by Eartha at the age of 89.

=== Museum ===
Throughout Eartha White's life, she actively collected period furniture, historical documents and photos of Jacksonville's past and Black Americans. She solicited donations from all of her contacts, both business and personal. The accumulation was housed in a building near Moncrief Springs until her death in 1974, after which many items were stolen or damaged. The remaining documents were turned over to the University of North Florida for safe keeping; the furniture and objets d'art were stored by the CWM.

The "Eartha M.M. White Memorial Art and Historical Resource Center" was dedicated on December 17, 1978, at the Clara White Mission. The "museum" is located at the north end of the second floor of the original mission building where Eartha's living quarters were located.

== Current programs ==
Most of the Mission's programs help the homeless daily:

- The feeding program provides over 400 hot meals each day, seven days a week.
- Transitional housing is provided for up to two years for the homeless to establish themselves in a job and leave the streets.
- Community outreach helps the homeless and at-risk youth avoid behaviors that are destructive.
- The drop-in day center is open to the homeless on weekdays, providing showers, laundry facilities, hot & cold drinks, snacks, computer and telephone access.
- Culinary Arts training program for homeless/low-income; with focus on veterans in need
- Janitorial/Construction training program for homeless/low-income; with a focus on veterans in need

Three quarters of area homeless are veterans and counselors are available to assist those seeking to improve their situation.

=== Clara's at the Cathedral ===

"Clara's at the Cathedral Café" is a co-operative project between the St. Johns Cathedral and the School of Culinary Arts at the mission. Every Friday since April 13, 2007, a luncheon has been prepared by the students and staff from the Mission's culinary school. The meal is reasonably priced and attracts workers from downtown businesses and retirees.

=== Catering ===
"Ashley Street Catering" is a full-service caterer at the mission. They prepare the food, transport it and serve it at the location of the client's event. Most of the staff are graduates of the CWM culinary arts program and all profits are returned to the mission.

== Funding ==
There are scores of companies, organizations and agencies on CWM's list of community service, hospitality and funding providers. Among them are the Blue Foundation, Community Development Block Grant Program, City of Jacksonville, Federal Emergency Management Agency (FEMA), Jaguars Foundation, Jessie Ball duPont Fund, Kirbo Foundation, Kraft Foods, Landwirth Foundation, Public Service Grant Program, Sodexo Foundation, United States Department of Housing and Urban Development, United Way of Northeast Florida, United States Department of Veterans Affairs, Weaver Family Foundation and WorkForce Florida.

The Eartha M.M. White Legacy Fund was established in 2005 through the Community Foundation in Jacksonville with a $1.4 million endowment, funded through the 2003 conversion of the assets of Eartha M.M. White Health Care Inc.

An annual benefit luncheon is held in mid-May for the mission called "Miracle on Ashley Street". Local celebrities from business, politics and the media serve guests, and chefs from area restaurants prepare their specialties. Entertainment is provided by students from the LaVilla School for the Arts. Attendance in 2008 was 1,500 and has risen steadily since the event was first held in 1998.

"Stars & Strikes Celebrity Charity Bowl" is a joint venture with the Jacksonville Jaguars.

=== 2010 Grant ===
The CWM was awarded a $50,000 grant from the Pepsi Refresh Project on May 28, 2010. The organization was selected by the weatherman and TV personality Al Roker live on the Today Show. CWM's president, Ju'Coby Pittman-Peele, had been invited to New York ostensibly to talk about programs making a difference in their communities.

== Awards ==
- The U.S. Department of Housing and Urban Development (HUD) named the Clara White Mission as recipient of the 2007 HUD Secretary’s Opportunity and Empowerment Award in a news release on May 16, 2008.
- Ju'Coby Pittman, CEO/president awarded the FBI Director's Community Leadership Award, December 2012
