= WOMAD Charlton Park =

Performing arts festival in Malmesbury, England

Coordinates: 51.5938°N 2.0778°W

WOMAD Charlton Park or WOMAD UK is the name given to the World of Music, Arts and Dance (WOMAD) festival that was held in Charlton Park near Malmesbury, Wiltshire, England, from 2007 to 2024. It was the direct successor to WOMAD Reading, which was held in the town of Reading each year from 1990 to 2006, and previous WOMADs elsewhere in England since 1986. The festival moved to Neston Park, also in Wiltshire, in 2026.

The WOMAD festival was held on the last weekend of July, and lasted three and a half days, stretching from the Thursday evening to early Monday morning. The line-up was predominantly World music, but blues, jazz, hip-hop, electronic and rock artists also appeared.

== Origins ==
WOMAD was pioneered by various international artists, notably Peter Gabriel in Shepton Mallet, where the first concerts took place in 1982. Peter Gabriel is still a major driving force behind the organisation and its various branches of activity in the music industry.

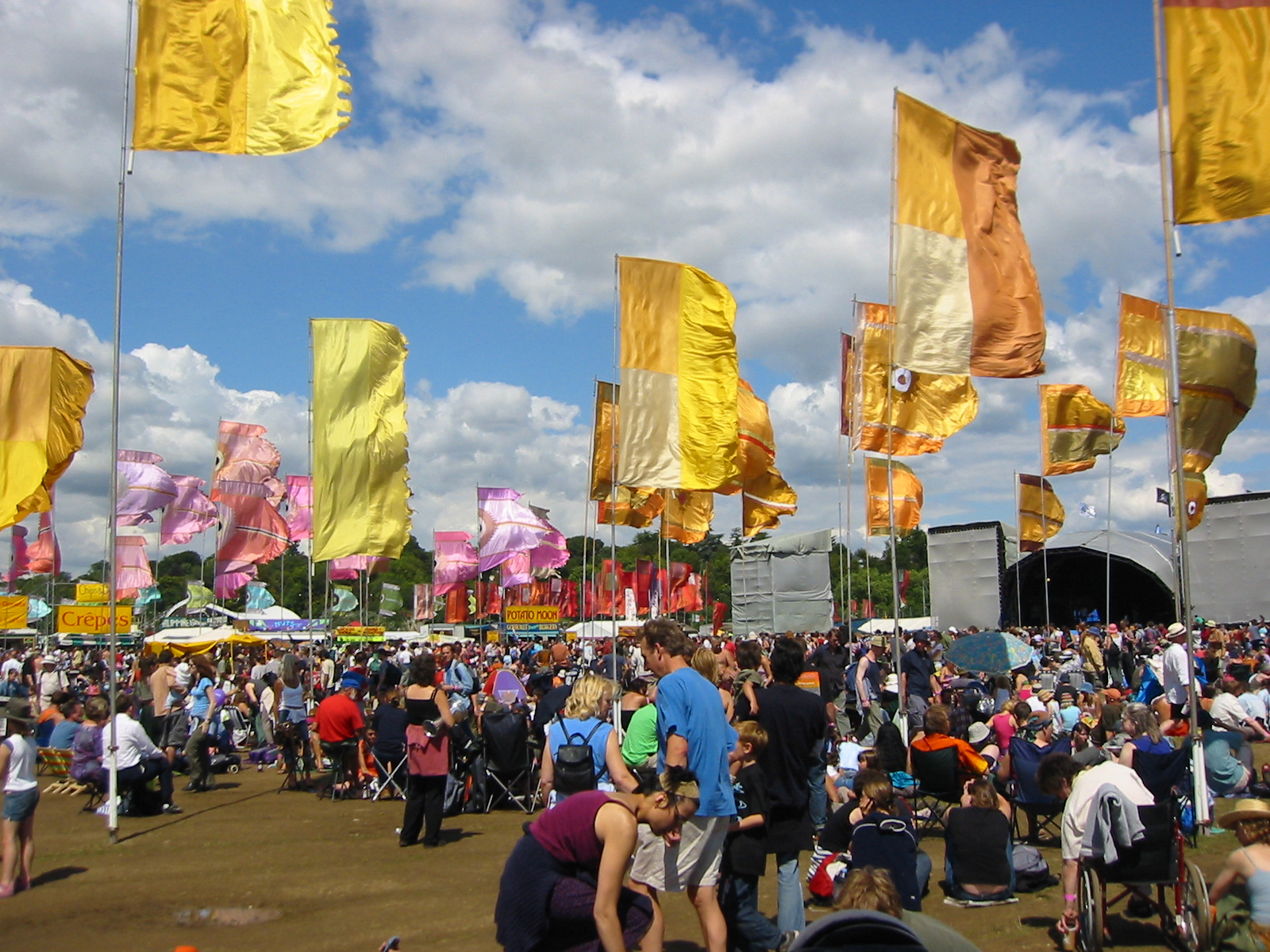
WOMAD Reading 2003

Reading became the regular site for WOMAD in the UK, eight years after its inception, and the festival became established there over 15 years. The first Womad Reading was held in 1990, and the last in 2006. Previous festivals had occurred in Shepton Mallet 1982, Mersea Island 1985, Clevedon 1986, Carlyon Bay 1987, Bracknell 1988, and Morecambe 1989–1997.

The festival took place every year on the last weekend of July, at the Rivermead Centre and Little John's Farm in Reading. By the end of its run in Reading, the festival had three stages:

- The Open Air (or Main) Stage
- The Siam Tent Stage
- The Village Stage

== 2007 ==
In light of the mud caused by poor weather prior to the first festival in its new location, and on the Saturday night, many festival goers nicknamed the festival WOMUD.

== 2008 ==
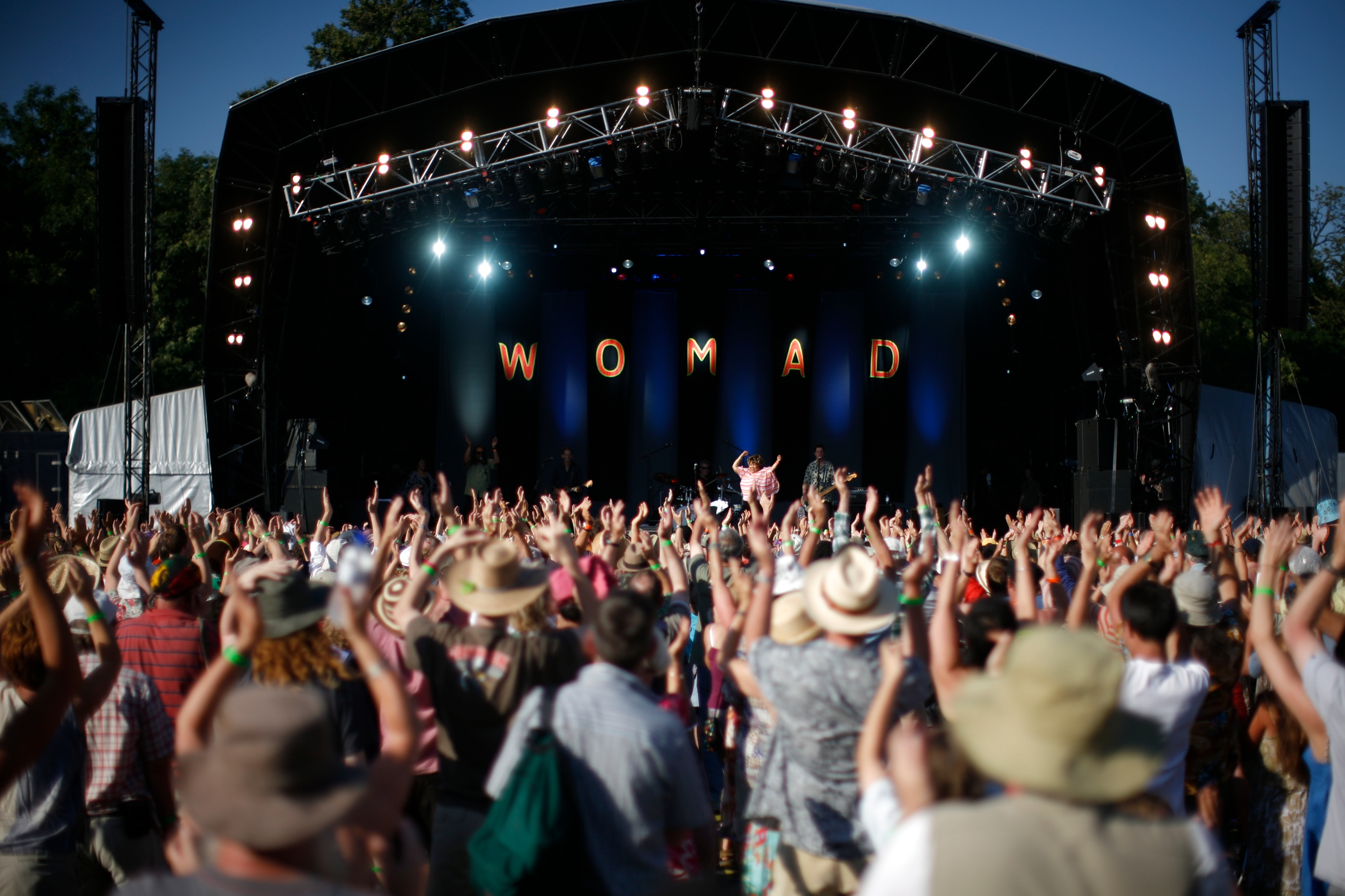
WOMAD Charlton Park 2008

WOMAD 2008 was luckier, a weekend of sunshine in an otherwise poor summer. The 2008 festival was well received and reviewed for its broad line-up and inclusive atmosphere. Mercury Prize-winner Roni Size Reprazent said: "What makes this festival different from every other festival that I've been to is when you walk into the tent. It's filled up with kids and buggies and their mothers and their fathers. Now that is an unbelievable sight."

The format has evolved and expanded since 1986. Stages in 2008 included:

- Open Air Stage: Sometimes referred to as the Main Stage, it is one of the two stages sharing headline acts, along with the Siam Tent. This stage hardly ever double books with the Siam Tent, as all the biggest artists usually appear on either stage.
- Siam Tent: Introduced in 1998 as an alternative to the Open Air Stage.
- Big Red Tent: The third main stage.
- Little Sicily: A quieter haven for acoustic acts and conversation, with tables and chairs.
- Dance Tent & Drum Tent: Two alternating venues of workshops featuring mainly African and Latin acts.
- BBC Radio 3 Stage: Set outside the main arena, featuring many artists who also played the main stages, and broadcasting live on BBC Radio 3.
- "Taste The World Stage" Where artists who are performing elsewhere at the festival are invited to cook for the audience. While they cook they are interviewed by a host and answer questions from the audience, and may play or sing as well. Unique to WOMAD

== 2013 ==
The headliners were Gilberto Gil, Rokia Traore, Seun Kuti and Lee "Scratch" Perry with Max Romeo (replaced Toots and the Maytals) Arrested Development were also added to the line-up later on

- Adjágas (Norway)
- Alice Russell (dropped out) Replaced by DJ Cheeba (UK)
- Amesmalua (Spain)
- Asif Ali Khan (Pakistan)
- Bwani Junction (UK)
- Canzoniere Grecanico Salentino (Italy)
- Carminho (Portugal)
- Christine Salem (Reunion)
- David Rodigan MBE (UK)
- David Wax Museum (USA)
- Debapriya & Samanwaya (India)
- Dizu Plaatjies and the Ibuyambo Ensemble (South Africa)
- Dub Inc (France)
- Emel Mathlouthi (Tunisia)
- Fanfare Ciocarlia (Romania)
- Fimber Bravo (Trinidad & Tobago)
- Flavia Coelho( Brazil)
- Fredy Massamba (Congo)
- GOCOO (Japan)
- Hidden Orchestra (UK)
- Huun-Huur-Tu (Russia)
- Iadoni (Georgia)
- Jagwa Music (Tanzania)
- Jesca Hoop (USA)
- Katy Carr & The Aviators (UK/Poland)
- Kissmet (India)
- La Chiva Gantiva (Colombia/Belgium/Vietnam/France)
- Le Vent Du Nord (Canada)
- Lévon Minassian (Armenia)
- Mala in Cuba (UK)
- Malawi Mouse Boys (Malawi)
- Malouma (Mauritania)
- Mohammad Reza Mortazavi (Iran)
- Mokoomba (Zimbabwe)
- Nano Stern (Chile)
- Ondatrópica (Colombia)
- Parov Stelar Band (Austria)
- Riot Jazz Brass Band (UK)
- Sam Lee and Friends (UK)
- Schlachthofbronx (Germany)
- Spoek Mathambo (South Africa)
- Steve Riley & the Mamou Playboys (USA)
- Syd Arthur (UK)
- Tamikrest (Mali)
- The Bombay Royale (India/Australia)
- The Heavy (UK)
- Urna & Kroke (Mongolia/Poland)

The following performers were on the BBC Radio 3 Stage, a quieter stage for smaller acts (in order of appearance):

- Mavrika (Greece)
- Barrule (Isle of Man
- Family Atlantica (Ghana)
- Lucas Santtana (Brazil)
- Zykopops (Croatia)
- Roopa Panesar (United Kingdom)
- Imperial Tiger Orchestra (Switzerland)
- Reverend Peyton's Big Damn Band (United States)
- DJ Tudo e sua gente de todo lugar (Brazil)
- La Pegatina (Spain)
- Fidan Hajieva (Azerbaijan)
- Guy Schalom & The Baladi Blues (Egypt)
- DaWangGang (China (People's Republic)
- KonKoma (Ghana)
- Red Hot Chilli Pipers (Scotland)

== 2014 ==
The 2014 headliners included Youssou N'Dour, Sinéad O'Connor, Manu Dibango and Les Ambassadeurs. The initial headlining act, Bobby Womack, died a few weeks before the festival.

== 2020s ==
WOMAD 2020 was cancelled due to the COVID-19 pandemic, and a virtual festival weekend was held instead. One band, Will Lawton and the Alchemists, gained permission to access the site and recorded a two-song set purely to be "The only band to play WOMAD 2020", with the video and images released via their Facebook and Instagram accounts.

WOMAD was cancelled again in 2021 also due to COVID-19, citing a lack of government guidance on restrictions after 19 July, and as with many other British music festivals, the lack of a cancellation insurance scheme from the government.

The festival returned in 2022 for its 40th anniversary and continued for two further years without any major changes to layout. The 2025 edition was cancelled in winter 2024 and the festival announced it would be changing locations. In July 2026, the festival was held at Neston Park, near Corsham, Wiltshire.
