= Charlwood House =

Listed building in West Sussex, England

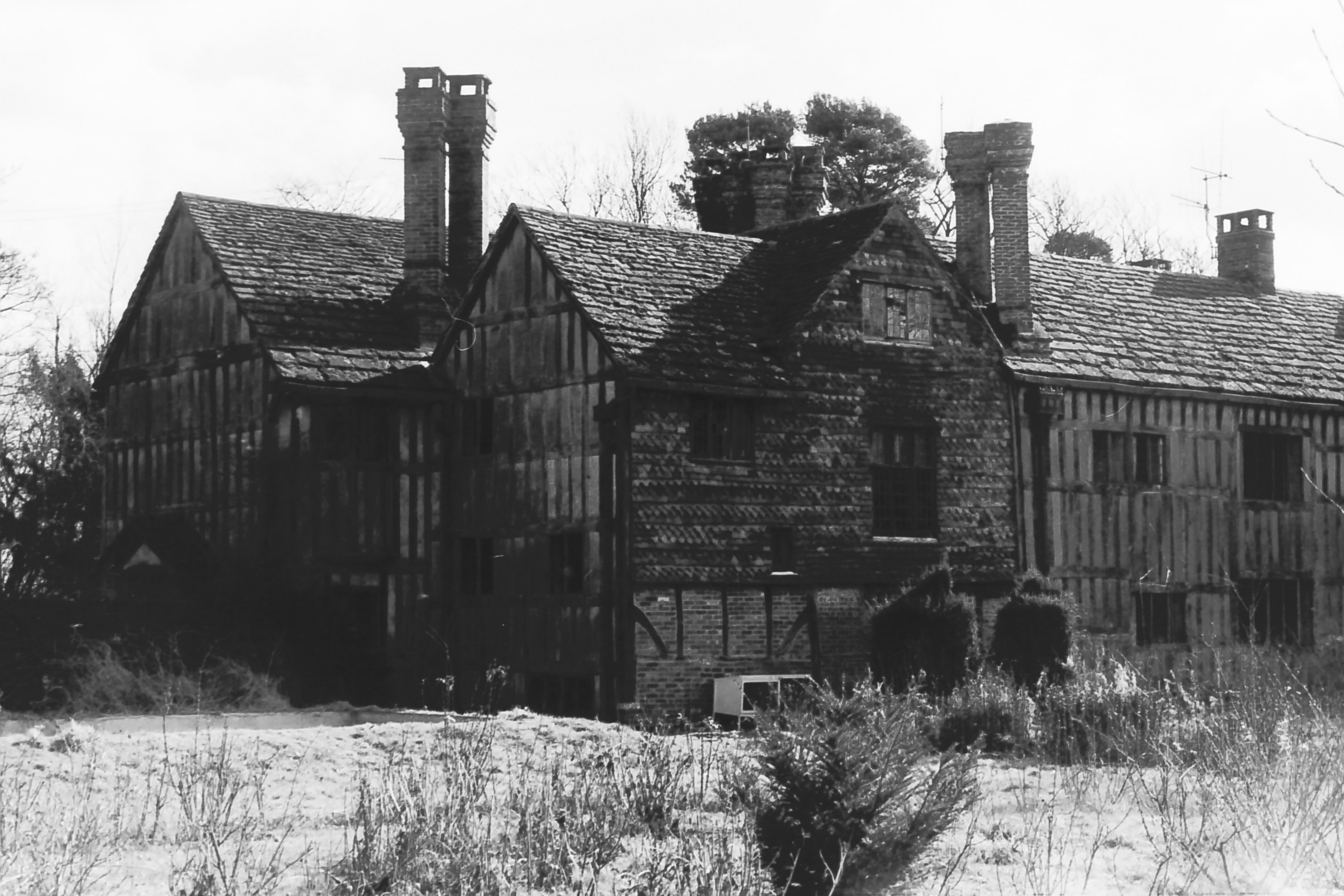

- Location within Crawley

General information
- Architectural style: Timber-framed Wealden hall house
- Location: Charlwood Road, Lowfield Heath, Crawley, West Sussex, England
- Coordinates: 51.1597°N 0.1971°W
- Year built: Early 17th century

Listed Building – Grade II*
- Official name: Charlwood House
- Designated: 11 November 1966
- Reference no.: 1187080

Charlwood House is an early 17th-century timber-framed country house in Lowfield Heath, Crawley, West Sussex, England. It is a Grade II* listed building which is used as a nursery school.

The tiled roof uses Horsham stone. A substantial extension was built in the same style in the 20th century.

== See also ==
- Charlwood (disambiguation)
- Grade II* listed buildings in West Sussex
