= Charlwood, Hampshire =

Hamlet in Hampshire, England

Coordinates: 51.079181°N 1.036923°W

Charlwood
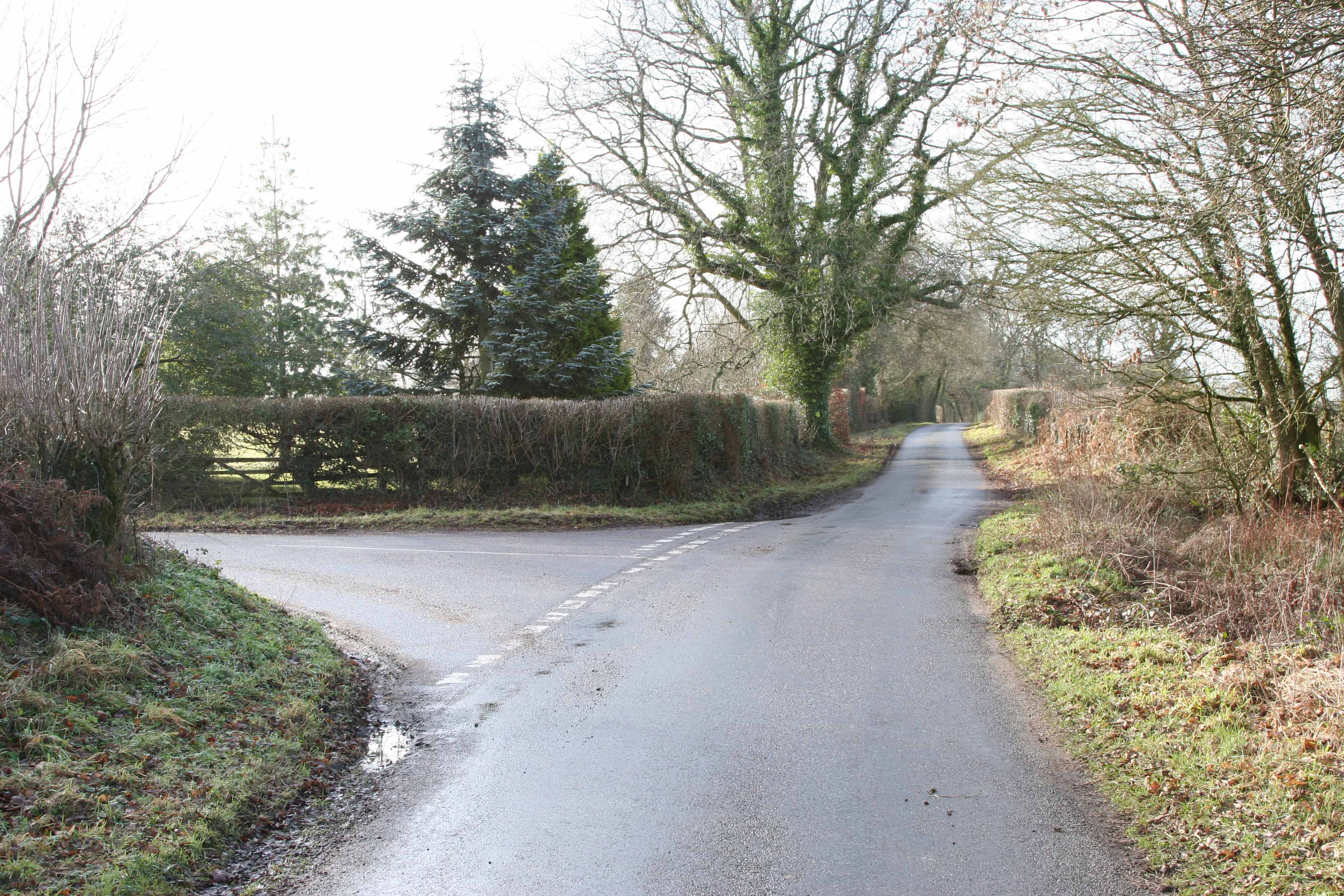
- Junction at Charlwood

- Location within Hampshire
- OS grid reference: SU 67943 30856
- Civil parish: Ropley
- District: East Hampshire
- Shire county: Hampshire
- Region: South East
- Country: England
- Sovereign state: United Kingdom
- Police: Hampshire and Isle of Wight
- Fire: Hampshire and Isle of Wight
- Ambulance: South Central
- UK Parliament: East Hampshire

Charlwood is a small hamlet in the East Hampshire district of Hampshire, England. It is in the large civil parish of Ropley and partially in East Tisted.

== History ==
Charlwood is first mentioned in 1218 as "Cherlewde". The name means the "Wood of the free peasant" from Old English "ceorl" and "wudu". It is recorded throughout the 13th century in conjunction with the Abbot of Titchfield who owned a wood in that Hamlet.

Little remnants of the medieval past of this hamlet are visible, no official archaeological survey has produced any finds from this period in the area. Nearby Lyeway has however produced a great number of medieval potsherds and related archaeology as it was a notable medieval farm in Ropley

Charlwood House is the oldest building in the hamlet, shown on a 1635 map of the surroundings of Rotherfield Park. On this same map a Brick Kiln and Clay Pit are shown nearby to this House, part of the larger brick making industry centred around Ropley and East Tisted.

In the 1800s the settlement of the hamlet reached its maximum with about 9 plots visible on the 1880s OS map. A methodist chapel was built to the south likely to serve this growing population in the early 1900s, however "its congregation gradually dwindled, and it became derelict and was demolished".

Throughout the 20th century the hamlet decreased more and more in size until reaching its present modern day state consisting of only two properties; Charlwood and Hunswood house.

== See also ==
- Charlwood (disambiguation)
