= Laughton =

Laughton may refer to:

== People ==
- Laughton (surname)

== Places ==
=== United Kingdom ===
- Laughton, East Sussex, England
- Laughton, Leicestershire, England
- Laughton, South Kesteven, Lincolnshire, England
- Laughton, West Lindsey, Lincolnshire, England
- Laughton-en-le-Morthen, South Yorkshire, England

=== United States ===
- Laughton (Kents Store, Virginia), a historic house

== See also ==
- Lawton (disambiguation)
- Lawtons
