= Lex Hester =

American public administrator (1935–2000)

- Born: December 24, 1935; Washington, D.C., US
- Died: October 7, 2000 (aged 64); Jacksonville, Florida, US
- Education: BA Political Science; MA Public Administration
- Alma mater: Florida State University
- Known for: effective public administrator
- Spouse: Kathy Hester
- Children: 3

Lewis Alexander Hester, III (December 24, 1935 – October 7, 2000) was a public administrator in Jacksonville, Florida. He "was the consummate no-nonsense administrator, the very best in his field," according to M. C. Harden III, past chairman of the Jacksonville Chamber of Commerce, influential in designing the city government of Jacksonville and managing it through the terms of three of Jacksonville's mayors. He served as the county Manager of Broward and Orange County and as City Manager of Duval County. He was largely responsible for the Blueprint for Consolidation which was a guide for cities all over the United States.

== Personal ==
Hester was born in Washington, D.C., on December 24, 1935, but raised in Neptune Beach. He married Joanna Gould and raised her daughter Kimberly and had one daughter, Tracey Alexandria. They divorced and he later married Kathleen Butler. He raised her daughter Danielle. Lex Hester suffered a heart attack and died on October 7, 2000, at age 64. He "was a gifted tennis player, frequently ranked among the top 10 in Florida in his age group" and the No. 1 player at Florida State University, where he earned the scholar-athlete award for the highest grade point average. He continued playing tennis after college and was a fierce competitor, receiving the "tennis player of the year" title from the Florida Tennis Association in 1990. While attending FSU, Hester was also a notable debater for four years and participated in debates with the Oxford Union Society in 1958 while in graduate school.

== Consolidation ==
After graduating from FSU with a bachelor's degree in political science and a master's degree in public administration, Hester was working as a wage and child labor investigator for the United States Department of Labor when the Florida legislature created the Local Government Study Commission (LGSC). Their goal was to reform Jacksonville's corrupt, inefficient government, and Lex Hester was hired as the executive director in 1965, with J.J. Daniel as chairman.

In November, 1966, a grand jury indicted 11 Jacksonville Public Officials on 142 counts of bribery and larceny including:

- Four of nine city councilmen
- Two of five city commissioners
- the city auditor
- executive secretary of city recreation department
- One of five county commissioners
- the county purchasing agent

The city tax assessor took the Fifth Amendment, refused to testify, and resigned. No indictments were handed down against the police & sheriff departments, but it was common knowledge that misconduct occurred.

The LGSC produced a consolidation proposal titled, Blueprint for Improvement that was placed on a referendum in 1967, with Lex Hester coordinating the campaign for passage. The indictments the previous year convinced the voters that a major change was necessary and the referendum passed. According to the Jacksonville Business Journal, "Hester was the key architect of Jacksonville's consolidated government and was the transition coordinator and chief administrative officer" following consolidation.

== Administration ==
Hester served as Jacksonville Mayor Hans Tanzler's chief administrator from 1968–1975. During that time, according to The Florida Times-Union, his guidance "provided for a better and more effective fire and rescue service, with unified command, control and coordination throughout the city and county." Hester was known for his shrewd negotiations and the impartial hiring standards employed under his consolidation. This ended the cronyism and nepotism present in prior administrations.

In 1975, Hester accepted the job as county administrator for Broward County for a substantial increase in salary. He stayed for three years before returning to Jacksonville in an unsuccessful campaign for mayor in early 1979. At the start of that summer, he was hired by then Governor Bob Graham to run the state energy office. He later spent several years administrating Orlando's city government, followed by another term in Broward County. During his time in Broward, Hester was instrumental is setting up the county's "first real bond issue" which provided over a quarter billion dollars for bridges, roads, parks and libraries. Money was also committed to expand to jail facility to eliminate chronic overcrowding and helped secure the county's acquisition of a parcel of land considered environmentally sensitive.

In 1991, Jacksonville's newly elected Mayor Ed Austin hired Hester to return to Jacksonville, in spite of recession offering him a substantial 42% raise in his previous salary to match the pay he had been receiving in South Florida. Austin, who later praised Hester's integrity and proficiency, credited Hester for substantial contributions to the River City Renaissance. In addition, Hester contributed to a number of civil projects and improvements under mayors Austin and John Delaney, including the Jacksonville Children's Commission. and the Better Jacksonville Plan.

== Honors ==
The Jacksonville Chamber of Commerce awarded him their Distinguished Citizen Award posthumously. He was also designated a Great Floridian by the Florida Department of State in the Great Floridians 2000 Program. A plaque attesting to the honor is located at Jacksonville City Hall.

The I.M. Sulzbacher Center for the Homeless dedicated the Lex Hester Family Dining Room on May 14, 2001 at their downtown campus. Linda Lanier, executive director of the center stated that Hester had, "quietly—behind the scenes as usual—made sure the homeless center was part of the River City Renaissance plan, and also that long-range funding for the center was in place. ...[The] appropriate thing to do was to name the room in honor of the man who so richly deserves it."

On August 13, 2002, the Jacksonville City Council approved an expenditure of "$50,000 as seed money for a[n endowed] scholarship" at the University of North Florida honoring Hester. UNF will "seek private donations for the fund", designated for students seeking a master's degree in public administration.
