= Lawton (given name) =

Lawton may refer to:

- Lawton Chiles (1930–1998), American politician from the U.S. state of Florida
- Lawton Fitt (born 1953), American banker
- Lawton Nuss (born 1952), American judge, a Kansas Supreme Court Justice
- Lawton S. Parker (1868–1954), American impressionist painter
- Lawton Leroy Pratt (1886–1943), American businessman, mortician, and funeral director
