= Sulzbacher Center =

Non-profit organization in Florida, US

- Organization logo
- Formation: 1995
- Type: NGO
- Legal status: Foundation
- Purpose: Humanitarianism
- Headquarters: (United States) Jacksonville, Florida
- Region served: Duval County, Florida
- President/CEO: Cindy Funkhouser
- Main organ: Board of Directors
- Budget: US$5.45 million (2009)
- Website: www.sulzbacherjax.org

The Sulzbacher Center is the only comprehensive homeless facility in Jacksonville, Florida, where the average stay is two months. A case manager works with every client to develop a plan to transition back into the community.

== Roots ==
I.M. Sulzbacher was a successful insurance broker and civic leader who entered politics during the Jacksonville Consolidation era and was elected to the Jacksonville City Council in 1968. Out of his concern for the homeless, he helped raise awareness about the problem, and convinced his fellow council members of the need for the city to help. With the support of city administrator Lex Hester, the construction of a homeless facility on city land was included in the 1993 River City Renaissance plan. The Sulzbacher Center signed a 25-year lease of the property in 1995. I. M. Sulzbacher served as a center board member who led fundraising efforts and donated his own money and time. He died on June 5, 2001, but the center became a lasting tribute to his name.

After Hester's sudden death at age 64, the Lex Hester Family Dining Room was dedicated in his memory on May 14, 2001. Linda Lanier, executive director of the center stated that Hester had, "quietly—behind the scenes as usual—made sure the homeless center was part of the River City Renaissance plan, and also that long-range funding for the center was in place. ... [The] appropriate thing to do was to name the room in honor of the man who so richly deserves it."

== Funding ==
In 1998, 22% of the center's $2.2 million budget came from city and federal funds. The remaining $1.7 million came from United Way, private individuals, corporate donations and grants from foundations. The budget had grown to $5.5 million in 2009, with government providing just 11% of the total.

== Services ==
The Sulzbacher Center addresses nearly all the needs of the homeless.

- Shelter – Dormitory style rooms are available for families with children, in order to keep the family together. Beds for individuals are provided in a barracks type arrangement.
- Health – Each person receives a comprehensive health assessment including medical, dental, vision and mental areas, then treatment is arranged for any problems found.
- Hunger – Three nutritious meals are provided every day of the year for all residents and for anyone else who shows up at mealtime. Many religious, civic and community organizations become Volunteer Meal Groups, who provide half of the meals served at the center. These groups take turns providing a meal on a certain date.
- Children – A separate children's building has computers, books and toys for recreation, as well as programs that feature tutoring, arts and crafts, music and scouting.
- Employment – Job placement is handled by Goodwill Industries, which provides coaching in job application and interviewing, assistance with transportation and appropriate shoes and clothing, and life skills, if needed.
- Housing – Placement in affordable, adequate housing is essential for re-integration into the community. Sulzbacher center has operated a few HUD-funded, scattered-site housing programs targeted to specific groups since 2001.
