= Moncrief Springs =

Natural spring in Florida

Coordinates: 30.3694°N 81.6831°W

Moncrief Springs, originally known as Moncrief's springs or Moncrief Spring, is a natural spring near Jacksonville, Florida in Duval County, Florida.

== Legend ==
According to legend, it is named for Eugene Moncrief, a pawnbroker who immigrated to Florida and settled in the area. An 1876 report touted a visit to the springs and its reported health benefits.

== Park ==
Plans to establish a pleasure park at the springs connected by electric tram to the city were announced in 1903. An ice cream company named for the springs incorporated in 1921.

Moncrief Spring Park is named for the spring. A five-mile race between a Cadillac and one of the first biplanes to visit the area was held.

During Peter Jones' tenure as mayor of Jacksonville a hotel and resort was developed by the spring. A horse track and bowling alley were among amusements. The resort lasted decades and the site was later used as a segregated public swimming facility for African Americans.

Moncrief Park is now a neighborhood of Jacksonville. The neighborhood came after what was a short-lived horse racing track of the same name. The American Derby was held at Moncrief Park.

The Moncrief Park neighborhood has seen economic ups and downs with public housing and road construction. In 2016 the Clara White Mission began raising crops there for a farm stand.
