= Ritz Theatre (Jacksonville) =

Theatre in Jacksonville, Florida, US

Coordinates: 30.3348902°N 81.6669427°W

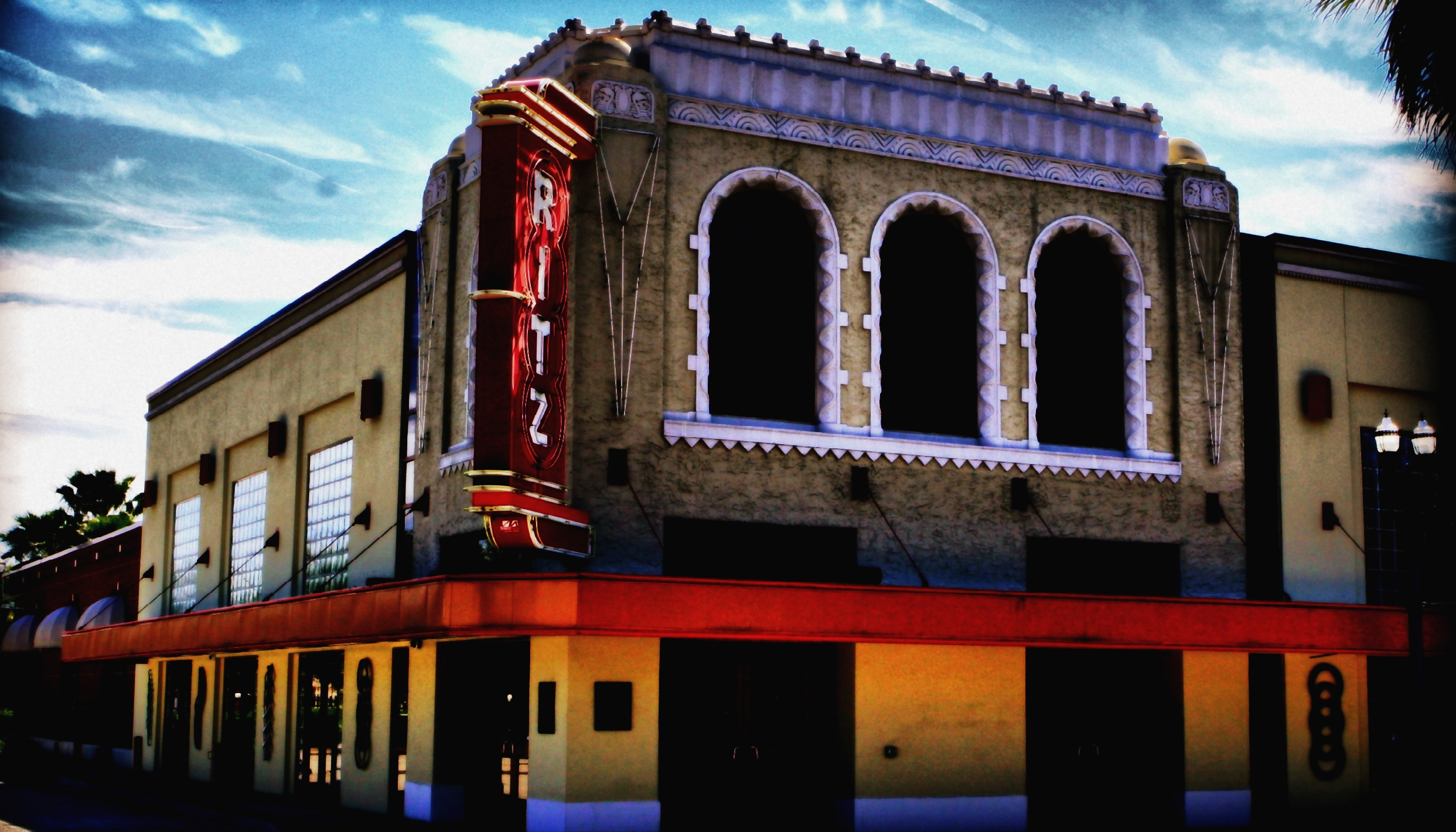
Ritz Theatre

The Ritz Theatre is an African-American oriented theatre in the LaVilla neighborhood of Jacksonville, Florida. The theater, which seats 426, is used for a variety of music, dance and theatrical productions, as well as movies. The spacious lobby is also used for private functions. Just off the lobby is the LaVilla Museum which holds 11,000 square feet (1,000 m^{2}) of exhibits. LaVilla is considered "the mecca for African American culture and heritage" in Florida.

== History ==
The Ritz Theater was designed in the Art Deco style by local architect Jefferson Powell and constructed in 1929 on the site of the Ritz Theater movie house in the LaVilla neighborhood. LaVilla had a thriving, vibrant culture from 1921 to 1971, when it was known as the "Harlem of the South". From the 1970s, the entertainment district of LaVilla went into decline and crime increased, but Mayor Ed Austin's River City Renaissance plan included $4.2 million to renovate the theatre and museum. The groundbreaking for the project was in 1998, and the pair were reopened on September 30, 1999. The sign and northwest corner are all that remain of the original building.
