= Val Lewton (visual artist) =

American painter and designer (1937–2015)

- Born: Val Edwin Lewton; May 23, 1937; Santa Monica, California, U.S.
- Died: April 24, 2015 (aged 77); Washington, DC, U.S.
- Occupations: Painter; artist
- Father: Val Lewton

Val Edwin Lewton (May 23, 1937 – April 24, 2015) was a painter and museum exhibition designer. As an artist, he created Realist acrylic paintings and watercolors of urban and suburban scenes, predominantly in the Washington, DC, area, where he lived and exhibited.

== Biography ==
Val Lewton was born May 23, 1937, in Santa Monica, California. His father, also named Val Lewton, produced a string of successful and influential B movies for RKO Pictures, including Cat People (1942) and I Walked with a Zombie (1943). His mother, Ruth Knapp, was a painter and teacher of autistic children.

He graduated from Whitman College (1959) in Walla Walla, Washington, and earned a master of fine arts degree from Claremont University (1962). After moving to Washington, DC, he served on the staff of the Smithsonian American Art Museum for 32 years, while maintaining a career as a painter in his own right.

Lewton died in 2015 from metastatic melanoma. Soon afterwards, exhibitions of his paintings were planned for the Katzen Arts Center (June 17 – August 13, 2017) and Addison/Ripley Fine Art (June 3 – July 8, 2017).

== Career ==
=== Painter ===
Chiefly known for his landscapes, Lewton generally depicted cities and suburbs with a detached, impersonal sensibility. Writing about his watercolors in Arts magazine in 1980, Harry Rand observed, “Either by implication or statement, personalities are absent from Lewton’s work; there is hardly a sense of the lives that move through those spaces he describes.” The critic compared the artist to Fairfield Porter, Edward Hopper, and Charles Sheeler.

Lewton painted from a young age. On a family trip to the Museum of Modern Art in New York City, he discovered the work of Henri Matisse, an encounter that permanently influenced his artistic vision. In the early 1960s, Lewton lived in Southern California and taught art classes at the University of California Riverside. During this period, he was inspired by the paintings of Roger Kuntz and the murals of José Clemente Orozco. In 1963, he reached out to his former Claremont professor, David Scott, then assistant director of the National Collection of Fine Arts, who encouraged him to apply to the Smithsonian Institution. The result was a cross-country move to the Washington, DC area, and two years later, he was included in the Corcoran Gallery’s annual group exhibition of local artists.

In 1973, the Studio Gallery gave Lewton his first solo exhibition in DC, “Val Lewton Is Dale City”, a title derived from the Virginia suburb of Dale City. In 1985, the Corcoran's 1985 “Washington Show” included Lewton's large-scale painting H Street Demolition created the previous year. His 60-by-100-foot Airshaft Mural, painted in 1988, relies on a trompe l'oeil effect that gives the viewers the impression of seeing through a concrete pylon built over I-395 to the U.S Capitol Building. "I sort of wanted to emphasize the concrete," Lewton told The Washington Post’s John Kelly. "I thought if it looked like it had been penetrated, it would make it look even more solid than it was."

=== Exhibition designer ===
Alongside his artistic career, Lewton became known for designing museum exhibitions in ways that suited the style of the artists featured. During his tenure at the National Museum of American Art, which later became the Smithsonian American Art Museum (SAAM), he created experiences for visitors to discover the work of Robert Rauschenberg, Louis Comfort Tiffany, Thomas Cole, Frank Lloyd Wright, and Frederic Remington, among others. “Val often incorporated a special element in his designs to evoke the era being displayed — sometimes as simple as a drapery to evoke a Gilded Age parlor,” stated SAAM director Elizabeth Broun in Lewton's Washington Post obituary.

He later worked on a freelance basis for the Phillips Collection and other institutions. In a 2013 blog post for the Phillips, manager of exhibitions Liz Strelka called Lewton the museum's "secret weapon". Strelka praised him as "a constant and integral part of our exhibitions, and the unsung hero of many an installation, carefully constructing a design layout and paint scheme for most of our special exhibitions, and transforming our spaces for each new exhibition to highlight the inherent qualities of artists and their work on display."

== Work in public collections ==
- National Gallery of Art Corcoran Collection
- Smithsonian American Art Museum
- The Phillips Collection
- American University Katzen Center
- The Fralin Museum of Art, University of Virginia
- George Washington University
- Towson State College
- University of the District of Columbia
- University of Vermont
- The Wilson Building, Washington, DC
- DC Commission on Arts and Humanities, Washington, DC
