= John Charlwood =

English cricketer

John Charlwood (8 March 1871 – 8 September 1923) was an English cricketer who played first-class cricket for Sussex. He was born in East Grinstead and died in Westminster.

Charlwood made three first-class appearances during the 1890 season, while he was still a mere nineteen years old - his debut coming against Marylebone Cricket Club. While Jesse Hide hit four wickets in four balls for Sussex, all but two batsmen in the entire match were stuck on single-figure scores.

In the following fortnight, Charlwood played two County Championship matches, one a sound thrashing at the hands of Nottinghamshire, which included a first-innings second-wicket partnership of 398 from Arthur Shrewsbury and Billy Gunn, and the second, a pleasing victory against WG Grace's Gloucestershire.
