= Harry Charlwood =

English cricketer

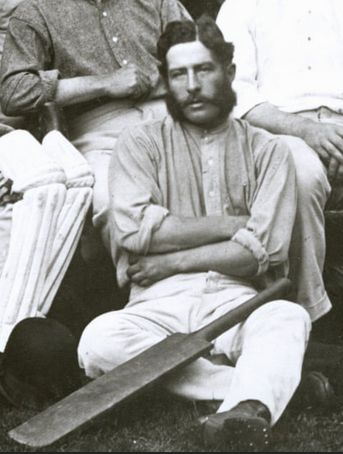
- Charlwood in 1876

Personal information
- Full name: Henry Rupert James Charlwood
- Born: 19 December 1846; Horsham, Sussex, England
- Died: 6 June 1888 (aged 41); Scarborough, Yorkshire, England
- Batting: Right-handed
- Bowling: Underarm (lob)
- Relatives: Charles Charlwood (brother)

International information
- National side: England
- Test debut (cap 2): 15 March 1877 v Australia
- Last Test: 4 April 1877 v Australia

Domestic team information
- Years: Team
- 1865–1882: Sussex

Career statistics
Competition	Test	First-class
Matches	2	197
Runs scored	63	7,017
Batting average	15.75	21.19
100s/50s	0/0	5/33
Top score	36	155
Balls bowled	–	128
Wickets	–	4
Bowling average	–	22.25
5 wickets in innings	–	0
10 wickets in match	–	0
Best bowling	–	2/12
Catches/stumpings	0/–	89/–
- Source: CricketArchive, 26 December 2009

Henry Rupert James Charlwood (19 December 1846 – 6 June 1888) was a professional cricketer who played for England in the first two Test matches against Australia in 1877. He played for Sussex from 1865 to 1882.

== Life and career ==
Harry Charlwood was a top-order batsman and occasional lob bowler who was one of Sussex's leading players in a lean period for the club. His highest score in first-class cricket was 155 for Players of the South against Gentlemen of the South in 1869. His highest score for Sussex was 123 in the victory over Kent in 1876, when no one else on either side reached 50. He also played many minor matches for the United South of England Eleven between 1866 and 1880.

Charlwood toured with James Lillywhite's team on the first cricket tour of Australia that included Test matches. Australia won the toss for the First Test and elected to bat. When England batted he joined Harry Jupp (16 not out) when England were 23 for 1. He and Jupp put on 56 runs for the second wicket, England's first 50 partnership in Tests. Charlwood made 36, which was the fourth-highest innings of the match. He added a further 13 in the second innings, just missing out on becoming the third Test batsman to score 50 runs in a career.

When the English team toured New Zealand just before the First Test, Charlwood won a greenstone pendant, crafted by a local jeweller, for making the highest score in the match against Wellington. He scored 56; no one else in the match exceeded 25. He had also top-scored in the previous match, against Auckland, making 65 in a "most brilliant display of scientific cricket" when no one else exceeded 44. Lillywhite's XI won both matches by an innings.

Charlwood was less successful after the tour, seldom reaching 50. His first-class career faded after he married and went to live in Derbyshire and then Scarborough, where he was the landlord of the Bell Hotel.
