= Charles Charlwood =

English cricketer

Personal information
- Full name: Charles Robert Charlwood
- Born: 22 November 1842; Horsham, Sussex, England
- Died: 16 May 1880 (aged 37); Horsham, Sussex, England
- Batting: Right-handed
- Bowling: Right-arm medium
- Relatives: Henry Charlwood (brother)

Domestic team information
- Years: Team
- 1866–1869: Sussex

Career statistics
Competition	First-class
Matches	3
Runs scored	40
Batting average	8.00
100s/50s	0/0
Top score	15
Catches/stumpings	6/–
- Source: Cricinfo, 6 January 2012

Charles Robert Charlwood (22 November 1842 – 16 May 1880) was an English cricketer. Charlwood was a right-handed batsman who bowled right-arm medium pace. He was born at Horsham, Sussex.

Charlwood made his first-class debut for Sussex against the Marylebone Cricket Club at Royal Brunswick Ground, Hove in 1866. He made two further first-class appearances for Sussex, both in 1869 against Lancashire at Old Trafford, and Kent at the Higher Common Ground, Tunbridge Wells. In his three first-class matches, he scored a total of 40 runs at an average of 8.00, with a high score of 15.

He died at the town of his birth on 16 May 1880. His brother, Henry, played in England's first ever Test match against Australia in 1877.
