= Alexander Charlwood =

English cricketer

Personal information
- Full name: Alexander Evelyn Charlwood
- Born: 25 November 1888; Eastbourne, Sussex, England
- Died: 23 June 1974 (aged 85); Hove, Sussex, England
- Batting: Right-handed
- Role: Occasional wicket-keeper

Domestic team information
- Years: Team
- 1911–1914: Sussex

Career statistics
Competition	First-class
Matches	12
Runs scored	165
Batting average	11.00
100s/50s	–/–
Top score	34
Balls bowled	–
Wickets	–
Bowling average	–
5 wickets in innings	–
10 wickets in match	–
Best bowling	–
Catches/stumpings	1/–
- Source: Cricinfo, 25 December 2011

Alexander Evelyn Charlwood (25 November 1888 – 23 June 1974) was an English cricketer. Charlwood was a right-handed batsman who occasionally fielded as a wicket-keeper. He was born at Eastbourne, Sussex.

Charlwood made his first-class debut for Sussex against Middlesex in the 1911 County Championship. He made nine further first-class appearances for the county, the last of which came against Warwickshire in the 1914 County Championship. In his ten first-class matches, Charlwood scored a total of 165 runs at an average of 11.00, with a high score of 34.

He died at Hove, Sussex on 23 June 1974.
