= Lawton Leroy Pratt =

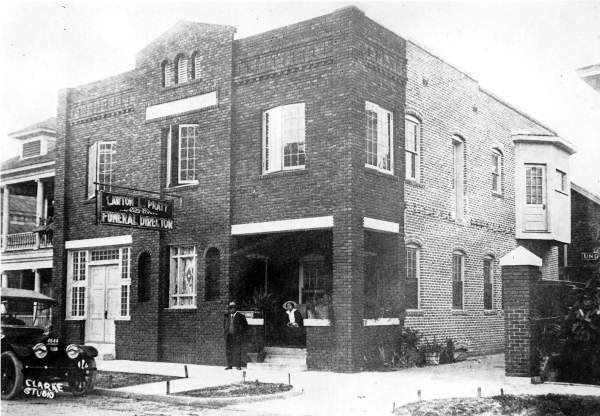
L.L. Pratt Undertaking Company in Jacksonville, FL

Lawton Leroy Pratt (1886–1943) was an American businessman, mortician, and funeral director. He and his wife owned a prosperous undertaking business, L. L. Pratt Undertaking in the LaVilla neighborhood in Jacksonville, Florida.

== History ==
Lawson Leroy Pratt was the second African American mortician licensed in Florida and began business in 1900. It was on the 400 block on Broad Street. The Beaver Street home/business was built in 1916. It was designed by architect Joseph Haygood Blodgett, an African American who worked in Jacksonville. It was in business until 2019.

Pratt was an organizer of the Florida Negro Embalmers and Morticians Association and its first meeting was held the Pratt Funeral Home. The Florida Archives have a photo of L. L. Pratt Undertaking at 527 West Beaver Street, where the family lived upstairs and did business below.

Oscar Hillman and his wife took over the business after Pratt's death. In 2021, a plan for adaptive reuse of the home with a conversion to apartments was proposed.
