= River City Renaissance =

Urban renewal fund

River City Renaissance was a $235 million bond issue in 1993 by the city of Jacksonville, Florida which funded urban renewal in some of downtown's most rundown sections.

== Plan ==
Ed Austin's most lasting contribution as Jacksonville mayor was his River City Renaissance (RCR) program, which revamped the city's historic downtown neighborhoods, especially LaVilla and Brooklyn. Lex Hester was Austin's chief administrator who created and managed the program. The program was controversial because most of the money was spent on inner city projects while other needs around the city were ignored.

== Projects ==
Most important among the projects was the city's purchase and refurbishing of the St. James Building, which became Jacksonville's new city hall, and the transformation of the Jacksonville Civic Auditorium into the Times-Union Center for the Performing Arts. Some RCR funds were allocated for Gator Bowl renovations; when the city was awarded an NFL franchise, they were used for construction of Jacksonville Municipal Stadium. Money was also spent for the Sulzbacher Center for the homeless, extension of the Jacksonville Riverwalk, assistance to the Jacksonville Zoo and Gardens to complete Phase I of their 1992 Master Redevelopment Plan, and establishing the Jacksonville Children's Commission.
