= Laughton (surname) =

Laughton is a British surname. Notable people with the surname include:

- Alaine Laughton (born 1978), Jamaican singer-songwriter
- Anthony Seymour Laughton (1927–2019), British oceanographer
- Charles Laughton (1899–1962), English actor and film director
- Charles E. Laughton (1846–1895), American politician and lawyer
- Dale Laughton (born 1970), Scottish rugby league player
- Dot Laughton (1913–1982), Australian cricketer
- Doug Laughton, English rugby league player and coach
- Eddie Laughton (1903–1952), English actor
- Fred Van Wyck Laughton, Canadian politician
- Gail Laughton (1921–1985), American jazz harpist
- Herbie Laughton (1927–2012), Australian singer
- John George Laughton (1891–1965), New Zealand missionary
- John Knox Laughton (1830–1915), English naval historian
- Michael Laughton (born 1934), British electrical engineer
- Mike Laughton (born 1944), Canadian ice hockey player
- Richard Laughton (died 1723), English Anglican priest and academic
- Scott Laughton (born 1994), Canadian ice hockey player
- Stacie Laughton, American politician
- Verity Laughton (born 1952), Australian playwright
- William Laughton (1812–1897) Moderator of the General Assembly of the Free Church of Scotland
