= Peter K. Thomas =

American dentist

Peter K. Thomas was a Los Angeles-based teacher and lecturer of restorative dentistry, most active in the 1960s. He performed dental work on many Hollywood celebrities and received awards from dental societies throughout the world, being considered one of the finest clinical dentists of his time. The Thomas notches, shallow notches found "on both cusp ridges on unworn molars," are named after him.

Thomas graduated from the University of Southern California in 1939. On November 18, 1975, he was inducted into The Ostrow School of Dentistry of USC Hall of Fame.
