= Masonic Temple (Jacksonville) =

- U.S. National Register of Historic Places
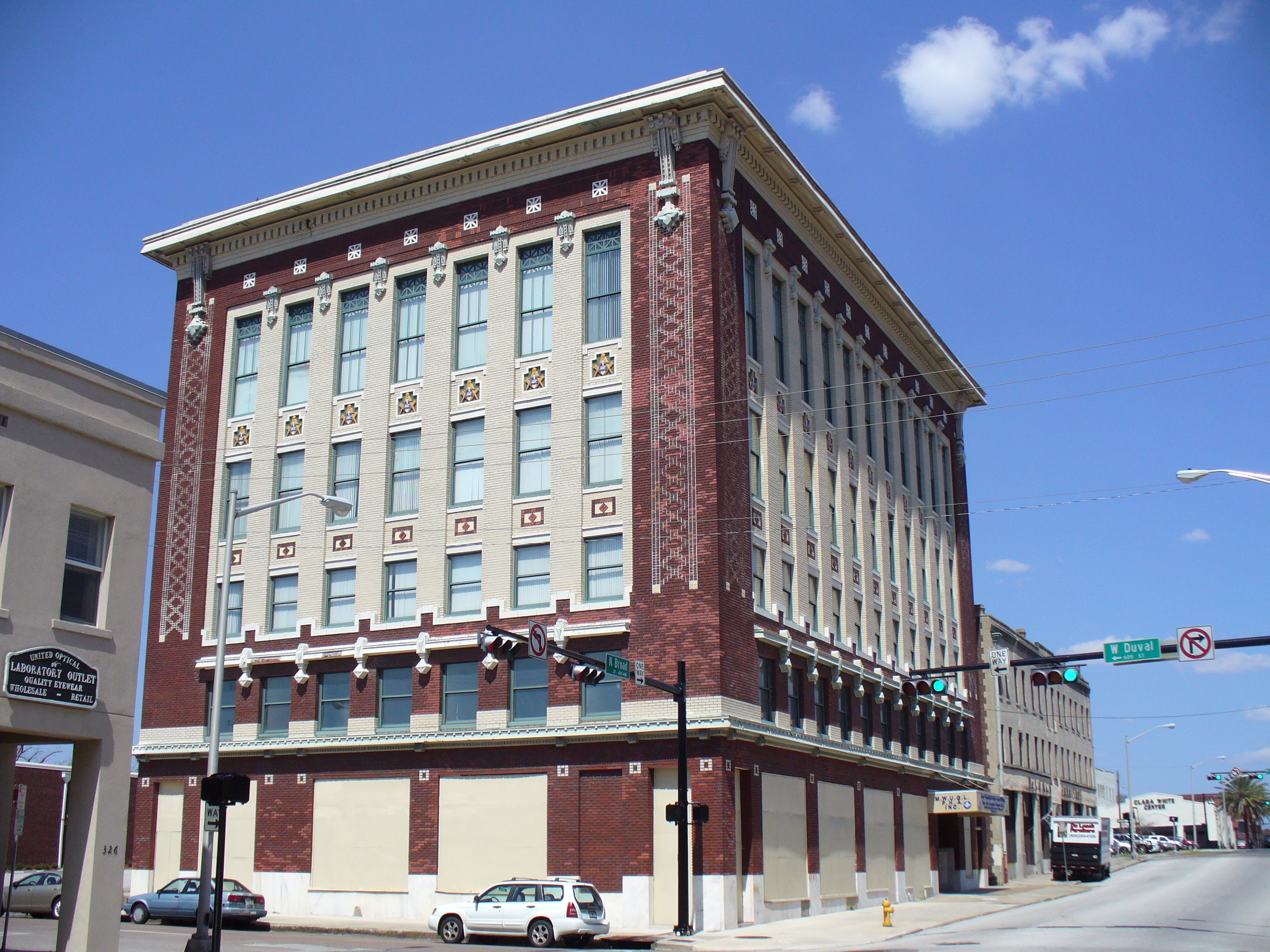
- Masonic Temple, Jacksonville, FL

- Location within Florida Location within the United States
- Location: Jacksonville, Florida, USA
- Coordinates: 30°19′51″N 81°39′52″W
- Architect: Mark and Sheftall
- Architectural style: Chicago School; Prairie School
- NRHP reference No.: 80000949
- Added to NRHP: September 22, 1980

The Masonic Temple (also known as Masonic Temple, Most Worshipful Union Grand Lodge PHA) is a historic Masonic temple in Jacksonville, Florida. It is located at 410 Broad Street. Constructed by the Grand Lodge between 1901 and 1912, it was added to the U.S. National Register of Historic Places on September 22, 1980.

The building currently contains retail space and non-Masonic office space as well as the offices and meeting rooms for the Most Worshipful Union Grand Lodge of Florida and Belize (a Prince Hall Masonic Grand Lodge).
