= John Henry Goldfrap =

American writer

John Henry Goldfrap (1879 – November 21, 1917) was an English-born journalist and author of boys' books, participating in the "American series phenomenon". He always wrote under pseudonyms.

== Biography ==
John Goldfrap was a member of the staff of the Evening World. He was born in England and worked first at San Francisco newspapers before moving to New York in 1905.

In addition to his children's stories and newspaper work, Goldfrap wrote movie scripts.

Goldfrap died on November 21, 1917, at Seaside Hospital, Staten Island, from tuberculosis. He left a widow.

== Works ==
Goldfrap wrote under various pen names, including "Captain James Carson," "Freemont B. Deering," "Marvin West," "Howard Payson," and "Captain Wilbur Lawton". Under the latter name he wrote the 1915 film The Wonderful Adventure.

Following is a list of his works under the respective pseudonyms.

Captain Wilbur Lawton

- The Boy Aviators (eight volumes, 1910–1915)
- The Dreadnought Boys (six volumes, 1911–1914)
- The Ocean Wireless Boys (six volumes, 1914–1917)

Lieutenant Howard Payson

- The Boy Scouts (14 volumes, 1911–1918)
- The Motor Cycle Chums (six volumes, 1912–1915)

Marvin West

- The Motor Rangers (six volumes, 1911–1914)

Dexter J. Forrester

- The Bungalow Boys (six volumes, 1911–1914)

Freemont B. Deering

- The Border Boys (six volumes, 1911–1914)
