= LaVilla =

- Neighborhood of Jacksonville
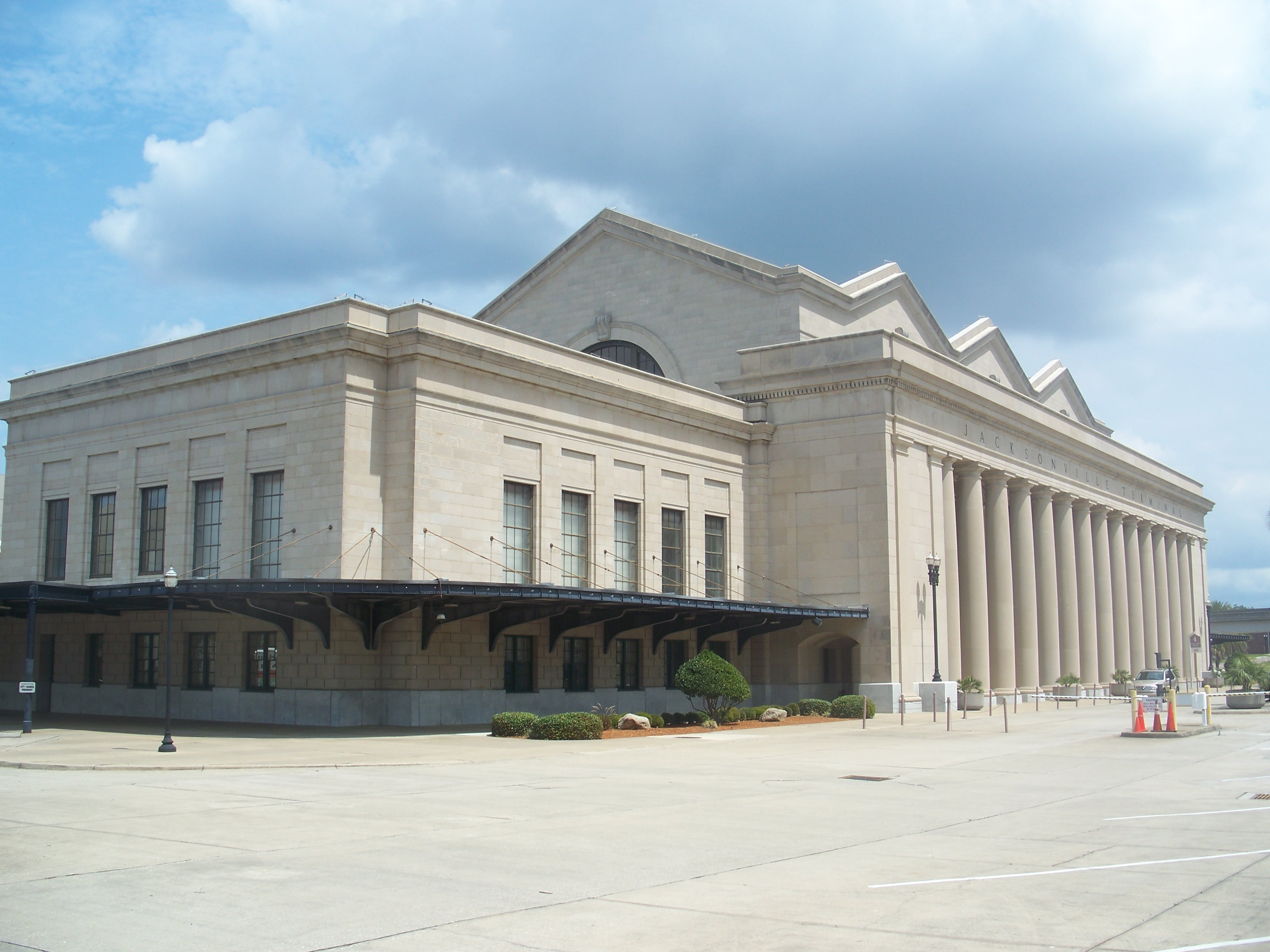
- Prime F. Osborn III Convention Center located in the southwest corner of LaVilla

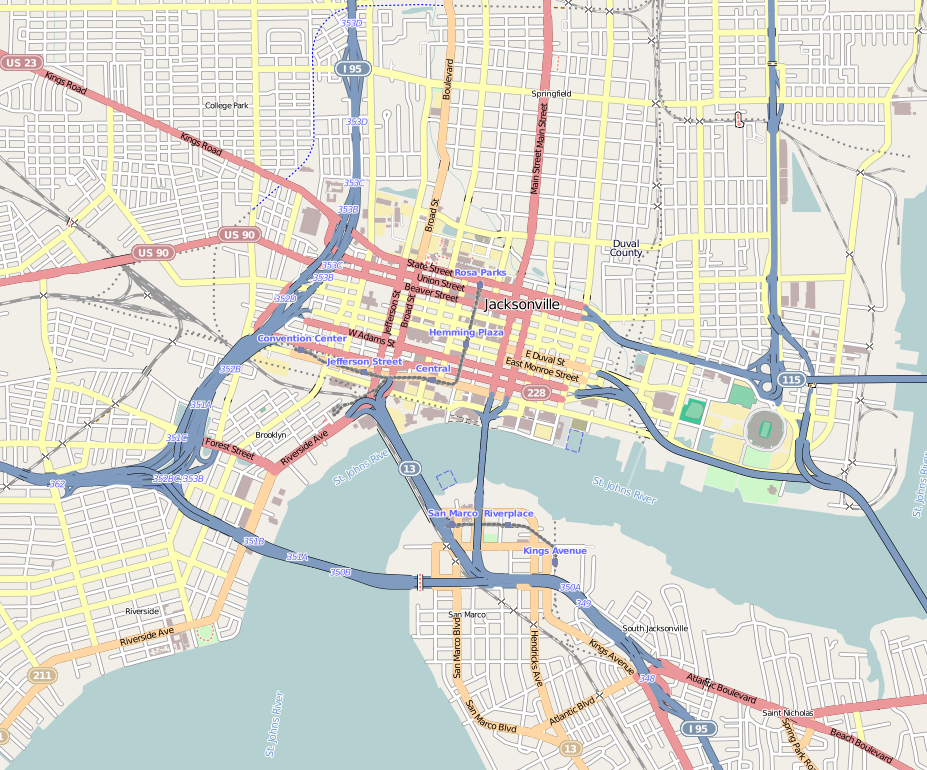
- Location within Central Jacksonville
- Coordinates: 30.3323°N 81.6667°W

Government
  - City Council: Garrett L. Dennis
  - State Assembly: Tracie Davis (D)
  - State Senate: Audrey Gibson (D)
  - U.S. House: Al Lawson (D)

Area
  - Total: 1.00 km^{2} (0.385 sq mi)
  - Land: 1.00 km^{2} (0.385 sq mi)

Population (2008)
  - Total: 185
  - Density: 186/km^{2} (481/sq mi)
- ZIP Code: 32202
- Area code: 904

LaVilla is a historic African American neighborhood of Jacksonville, Florida and was formerly an independent city. It developed after the American Civil War and was eventually annexed to the city of Jacksonville in 1887 and is now considered part of downtown.

It was struck by the Great Fire of 1901. During its height, the area was considered "the mecca for African American culture and heritage" in Florida, particularly its northern sections. It remains primarily an African-American neighborhood. The Ritz Theatre, Richmond Hotel, and the Clara White Mission are among the historic buildings in the area. Several are listed on the National Register of Historic Places. The area became a transportation hub with rail service developed by Henry Flagler and was also a cigar making center that included Greek and Syrian immigrants.

== Location ==
LaVilla lies to the northwest in Jacksonville's downtown. It is bounded by State Street to the north, I-95 to the west, Broad Street to the east, and Brooklyn to the south.

== History ==
=== 19th-century ===
Architectural diagrams of the LaVilla Boarding Houses made for the Historic American Buildings Survey

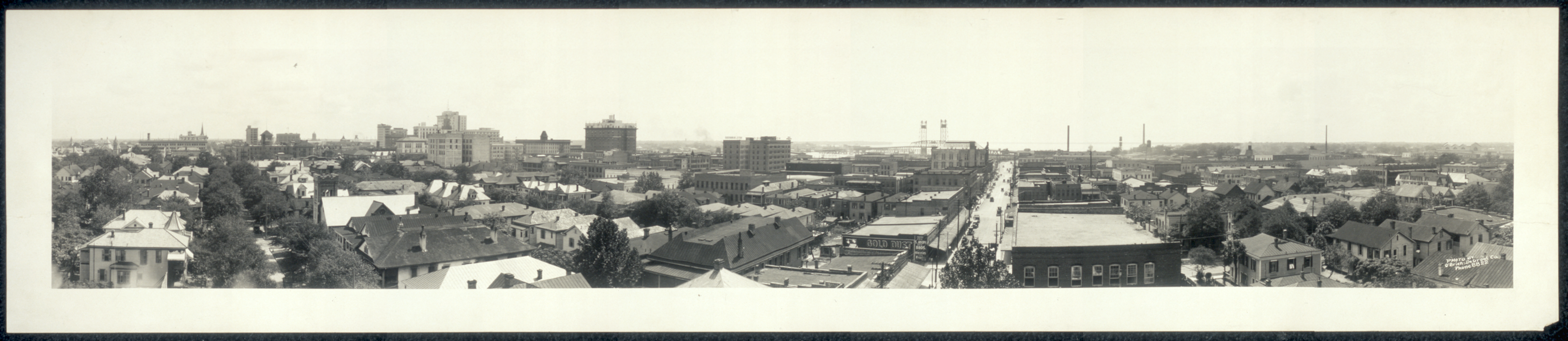
Corner of Duval and Broad Street, atop historic Masonic Temple, circa 1921

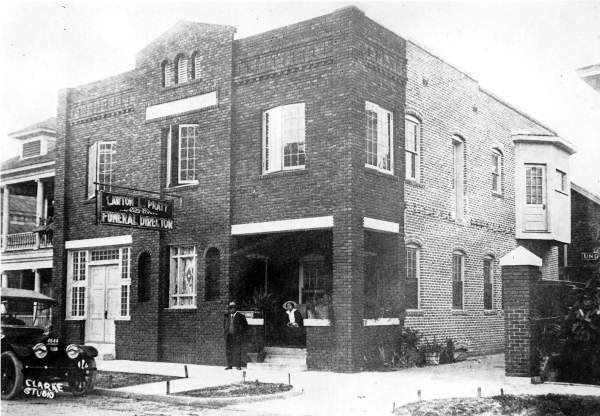
L.L. Pratt Undertaking Company, active from 1916–2019 in LaVilla

John Jones, an Anglo-American colonist, received a Spanish land grant for much of this area in 1801, when this part of Florida was still Spanish territory.

At different points in the American Civil War, when Jacksonville and northeastern Florida were under Union control, the area was the site of a large Union garrison. Many slaves sought refuge with Union troops and, under the Emancipation Proclamation of 1863, gained freedom. After the war, the town attracted additional freedmen, some of whom left rural areas, and was incorporated as LaVilla.

The town developed as a suburb to Jacksonville during the Reconstruction era. The population was mostly black, and many Black citizens were elected to positions in Lavilla's government, including mayor and councilmen. In 1887 LaVilla and five other suburbs, including Riverside and Springfield, were annexed by the City of Jacksonville. It became a neighborhood of the city.

=== 20th-century ===
In 1902, the state legislature passed a new constitution, adopting barriers to voter registration and voting that resulted in the deliberate disfranchisement of African Americans to exclude them from politics. The part of LaVilla north of Adams Street was for many years a center of African-American life and culture in Jacksonville. The southern part of the neighborhood was developed as a major railroad hub in the late 19th century; several rail lines met at Union Station (now adapted for use as the Prime F. Osborn III Convention Center). For a time, this was Jacksonville's primary red light district.

Author Stephen Crane frequented LaVilla during his time in Jacksonville; he met his future wife, Cora Crane, who was at the time a brothel proprietor.

Lavilla was the site of the Great Fire of 1901, which spread and destroyed most of downtown, but the neighborhood was largely spared. In the first half of the 20th century, the neighborhood was an important center of African-American culture. A vibrant music and entertainment scene emerged, attracting many nationally renowned jazz artists to play at local black clubs on and off Ashely Street. Such clubs were segregated under the state laws that imposed Jim Crow. In 1929 the Ritz Theatre opened, becoming an important stop on what was called the Chitlin' Circuit for black entertainers. It became LaVilla's primary performance venue.

The area on Ashley Street west of Broad Street, to and including Davis Street, included landmarks such as Nick’s Pool Parlor, as well as the Strand, the Frolic, the Globe and the Roosevelt theaters. The Wynn/Egmont Hotel was known to provide the best accommodations for touring performers; the Boston Chop House, Mama’s Restaurant and Hayes Luncheonette served good food; the Lenape Bar and Manuel's Taproom were the favorite watering holes. The Ritz Theatre and The Knights of Pythias Hall hosted numerous famous performers.

In the 1930s the "Negro" section of the Federal Writers' Project in Florida was based in LaVilla. Zora Neal Hurston was involved from 1935 until 1937.

After the 1960s, the neighborhood entered a period of precipitous decline. The railroad industry restructured, leading to a massive loss of jobs here and across the country. In addition, the construction of I-95 disrupted and divided the neighborhood. With the end of legal segregation following civil rights legislation in the mid-1960s, many residents left the area to pursue newer housing and work opportunities elsewhere.

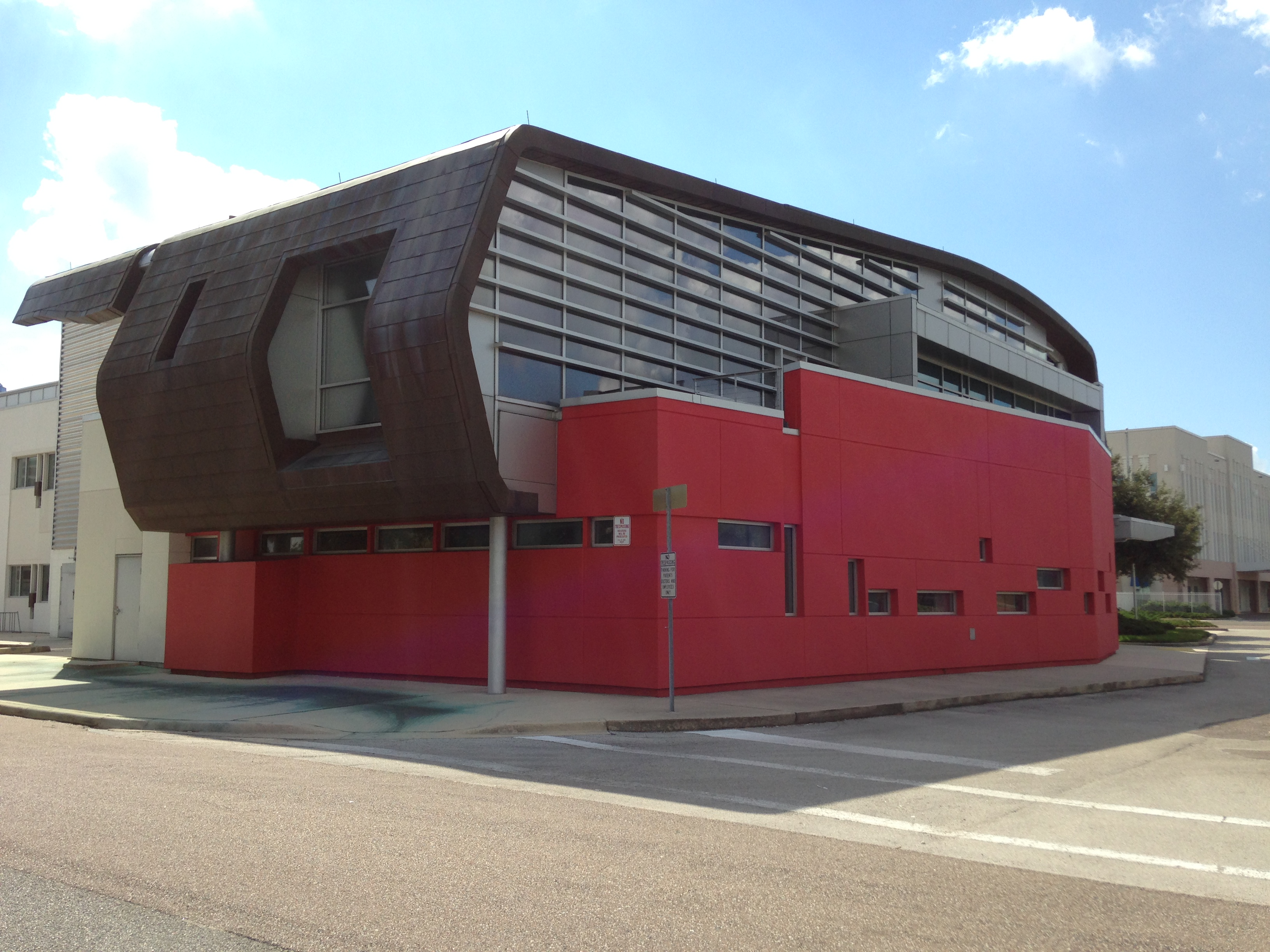
Office building in LaVilla

During the 1980s the crack cocaine epidemic hit hard among struggling residents of LaVilla, resulting in an increase in crime and furthering the decline. According to General Counsel Rick Mullaney, who was chief of staff under Mayor Ed Austin, the area became "nothing but crack houses, prostitution and crime."

The 1993 River City Renaissance plan crafted by Mayor Ed Austin allocated millions of dollars to renovating and developing LaVilla. Dilapidated buildings were torn down and significant historical structures, such as the Ritz Theatre, were restored or reconstructed, often in public-private partnerships. The Ritz also serves as the LaVilla Heritage tourism has been emphasized.

== Transportation ==
LaVilla is served by the Jacksonville Transportation Authority's zero-fare Jacksonville Skyway automated people mover system and an extensive bus network.

Current Skyway Stations in LaVilla

- Jefferson at Jefferson Street & Bay Street, serving the Federal Reserve Building and Courthouse.
- Convention Center on Bay Street serving the Prime F. Osborn III Convention Center.

== Attractions and characteristics ==
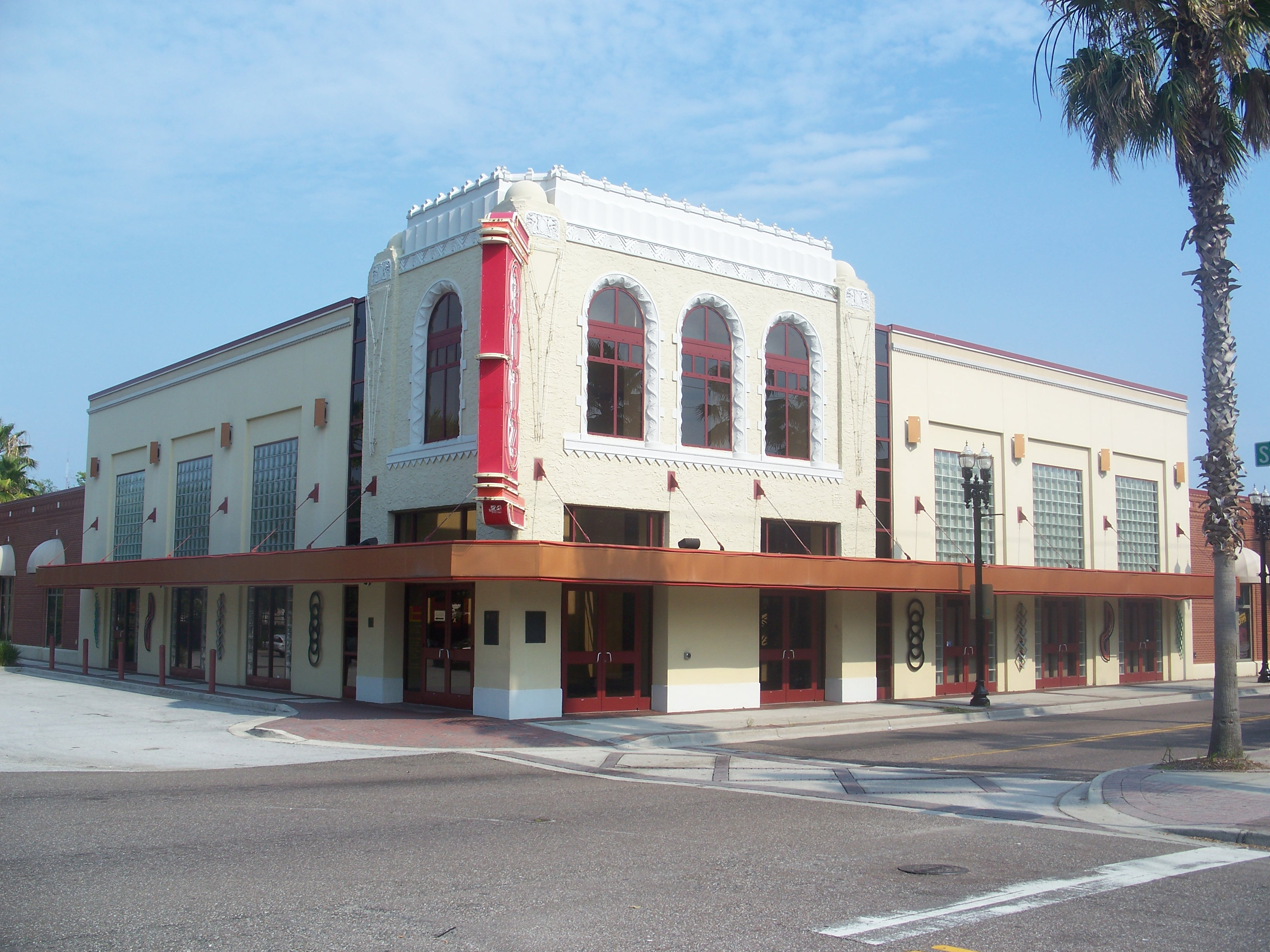
Ritz Theatre in LaVilla

Venues, such as the Ritz Theatre, showcased black entertainers and catered to black audiences. The theatre still host shows and also offers visitors a look at black history.

The Jacksonville branch of the Federal Reserve Bank of Atlanta is located on Water Street at the southern bounds of LaVilla.

The southern part of the neighborhood was once a major railroad hub, with several rail lines meeting at Union Station (now the Prime F. Osborn III Convention Center), and probably not coincidentally, was also for a period Jacksonville's primary red light district.

LaVilla School of the Arts is a popular magnet middle school in Duval County that follows in the performance and art traditions of the Ritz/LaVilla area. Ritz Voices is a 100-member youth choir in the area.

The Clara White Mission is also located in LaVilla in the former Globe Theatre.

== Mayors of LaVilla ==
- Francis F. L’Engle (1866)
- Mitchell P. Chappelle (1874–1876)
- Alfred Grant (1876–1877), also served as a councilman state representative
- 1887 - LaVilla is annexed by the City of Jacksonville
