= Charlwood Lawton =

English lawyer (1660–1721)

Charlwood Lawton (17 February 1659 – 12 June 1721) was an English lawyer and phrase-making pamphleteer, a Whig of Jacobite views. He invented the term "Whiggish Jacobite", used to point out the difference between those who shared his opinions (who included Sir James Montgomery, 4th Baronet and Robert Ferguson), and the nonjuror faction. After the Battle of La Hogue of 1692, the exiled James II of England became more receptive to Lawton's range of arguments. Lawton promoted "civil comprehension", i.e. the removal of all religious tests for the holding of public office. He was a prolific author of subversive literature, to whom some uncertain attributions are made. He is credited with the concept that the Glorious Revolution was a constitutional charade that fell short of its ideals.

== Life ==
He was the son of Ralf Lawton, of Egham, Surrey, surgeon general in the army. He entered as a fellow commoner Wadham College, Oxford, 23 August 1677. He matriculated on 7 December 1677, but left university without taking a degree. He became involved in Monmouth's Rebellion of 1685, and had to lie low. For a time he then lived near Windsor Forest.

Lawton became acquainted with William Penn by a chance meeting on a coach in the summer of 1686, and the two remained friends for life. William Popple met Penn in 1687, at Windsor where he was staying with Lawton.

Lawton was called to the bar from the Middle Temple in 1688. Aaron Smith was a militant Whig for whom Lawton procured a royal pardon, through Penn, in 1688, and John Trenchard another in the same year; according to Lawton's memoir of Penn, the Smith pardon preceded the Trenchard pardon.

After the Revolution, Lawton met the Jacobite envoy Richard Graham, 1st Viscount Preston in 1690. Preston being a Protestant loyalist to King James, and Lawton's faction being a counterweight to the Catholic influence on the exile king, it was a setback when Preston and John Ashton were arrested on a journey to see him (the so-called Whig-Jacobite Plot).

Lawton corresponded with John Drummond, 1st Earl of Melfort from 1692. Subsequently, Lawton was in touch with King James's more moderate adviser Charles Middleton, 2nd Earl of Middleton. He also canvassed for support among the Green Ribbon Club, and flattered Sir William Whitlock, who was in transition to becoming a Jacobite Tory. At the time of the 1696 assassination plot against William III, Lawton was implicated by name as a go-between for James II and Parliament.

Lawton acted in 1700 as Penn's agent in London. At this point, which was during Penn's second visit to Pennsylvania, he was facing determined opposition, in particular from Jeremiah Basse and Edward Randolph. Lawton was tasked with assembling a group of Penn's supporters from his English network, and this involved contacting Robert Harley. Others to be brought in were Sir Edward Seymour, 4th Baronet, Sir Christopher Musgrave, 4th Baronet, and Sir John Lowther, 2nd Baronet, of Whitehaven. Penn was concerned to have his reputation boosted by a pamphlet with a show of strength from the Tory ranks. Lawton then became a close adviser to Harley.

Lawton's continuing good relations with the nonjurors were illustrated by a dedication or address of a section in Linguarum veterum septentrionalium thesaurus after 1701; this was the work of George Hickes, one of the pinnacles of nonjuror scholarship, and Lawton was substituted for the late Bartholomew Shower, a Tory lawyer. Not a practicing barrister, he knew prominent lawyers, including John Somers and George Treby; Lawton lobbied Somers over the private act on behalf of John Burke, 9th Earl of Clanricarde.

At the time of his death, on 12 June 1721, Lawton was described as "of Northampton". He is buried at St. George the Martyr Cemetery, Brunswick Square, renamed St George's Gardens.

== Works ==
Lawton was a prolific writer of pamphlets, including an early group of Jacobite propaganda tracts. In 1693 his hope was for a bloodless restoration of James II. Lawton had the co-operation of the printer William Anderton in distributing his work. Anderton was executed on a treason charge. Related are:

- A Short state of our condition with relation to the present Parliament (1693) This pamphlet was called the "hush-money paper" because of its criticism of the use of secret payments; Lawton has been credited with inventing the term "hush money". He alleged that £16,000 of secret service money had been paid out in bribes over three days.
- Some Paradoxes Presented for a New-Year's-Gift from the Old, to the New Orthodox, Serving for an Index to the Revolution (1693)
- A French Conquest neither Desirable nor Practicable (1693), printed by David Douglas.
- The Jacobite Principles Vindicated (1693, later in Somers Tracts); here Lawton argued on contractarian grounds. The subject was topical, with John Wildman arguing that the "original contract" for monarchy had been renewed by the Bill of Rights 1689, and Anderton concluding that William III was therefore accountable to it.
- A Letter concerning Sir William Whitlock's Bill for Trials in Cases of Treason (1694);

Another group were:

- A Letter concerning Civil Comprehension, 1705;
- Second Letter concerning Civil Comprehension, 1706;
- a letter sent to John Tillotson.

These were republished in the Somers Tracts. Letters addressed by Lawton to White Kennett are in the Lansdowne MS. 990, ff. 15, 83.

Lawton planned to publish memoirs, and was said to have left papers relating to the affairs of his time. One such document, dealing with the life of Penn for a short period after Lawton knew him, was printed in 1834, in vol. iii. of the Memoirs of the Historical Society of Pennsylvania.

== In literature ==
Lawton is referenced in Waverley, in the company of the other writers James Drake and Nicholas Amhurst.

== Family ==
Lawton married Margaret, fourth daughter of William Lawton and Hester, who was the second daughter of Sir Edward Longueville, 1st Baronet. He left a son Henry (baptised 6 September 1690 Egham, St John, Surrey).

== Notes ==
Attribution

- This article incorporates text from a publication now in the public domain: Archbold, William Arthur Jobson (1901). "Lawton, Charlwood". Dictionary of National Biography. London: Smith, Elder & Co.
