= Will Lawton =

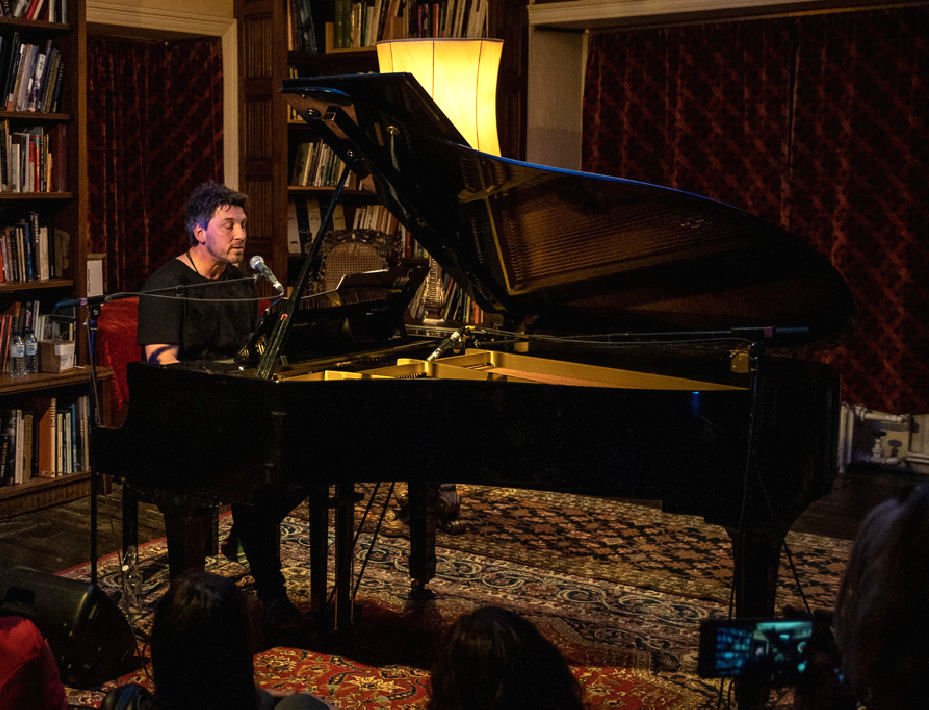
- Will Lawton performing at Abbey House, Malmesbury in March 2019

Background information
- Born: 24 June 1974 (age 52)
- Origin: Somerset, England
- Genres: Indie Rock, Cross-over Jazz, Folk,
- Occupations: Singer songwriter, music therapist
- Instruments: Vocals, Piano, Hang
- Years active: 2000–present
- Labels: Mad Ron Records, Will Lawton Music, Supermarine Music
- Website: willlawtonmusic.co.uk

Will Lawton (born 24 June 1974) is a British singer-songwriter, pianist, hang player, and music therapist. He has been the song-writing force behind four EPs and six studio albums. Lawton’s music "weaves a tapestry of live piano with a supple and distinctive voice that speaks of love and loss, truth and lies, the whole spectrum of this painful, yet magical existence we call life". He draws inspiration from singer-songwriters including Ray LaMontagne, Eddie Vedder, Nick Drake and Ben Harper.

== Music career ==
Lawton began his musical career after forming Orangutan with guitarist and drummer Joe Holweger and recording the Surprised Coconut EP in west London. In 2001, Lawton with Neil Muttock on guitar formed The Zennor Project with band members Tracy Jane Sullivan, Peter Van Pletzen and Ashley Moffatt and released the Twist EP. Lawton, Holweger and Muttock reconvened and went on to release two albums, The Monkey and the Whale by Brontosaurus in 2006, and Ember by Orangutan in 2008

In 2012, Lawton performed with The Heavy. He went onto record a solo project, The Wood Room Session at Real World Studios. He formed The Home Fires with Neil Muttock and Nikki Capp and performed at Priddy Folk Festival and Purbeck Folk Festival in 2012. Following a successful crowdfunding campaign, the band recorded This Too Shall Pass at Real World Studios, which featured musicians Phillip Henry (dobro), Hannah Martin (violin and vocals) and Bethany Porter (cello and vocals).

Lawton started working with drummer Weasel Howlett in 2015 and the duo went onto write and record Fossils of the Mind at Real World Studios. The album was released in 2017, with a vinyl release the following year after a successful crowdfunding campaign through Kickstarter. As of 2019, the band are active and regularly joined by Buddy Fonzarelli on bass guitar, Ami Kaelyn on guitar and vocals and Harki Popli on tabla. They recorded a live session in March 2019 in the library at Abbey House in Malmesbury and released 'Abbey House Session' in 2020. Lawton currently performs solo, with his band and works as a music therapist. To accommodate the growing number of current band members, the band currently perform as 'Will Lawton and the Alchemists' and re-released 'Fossils of the Mind' under this name in 2020.

In April 2020, Will collaborated with a group of poets that he had never met after issuing an appeal for original poetry written during the time that the UK was in lockdown. He composed, recorded and co-produced 'Salt of the Earth' which was co-produced, mixed and mastered by Patrick Phillips. Each poem is embedded in meditative piano and ambient soundscapes and was released digitally in May 2020.

Lawton met Argentinian guitarist Ludwig Mack in October 2020 through Instagram. Mack had travelled to the UK to meet British musicians but arrived just hours before the first national lockdown. Stranded in a cottage in Hullavington, Wiltshire, the duo realised they lived only a few miles away from each other and began collaborating before recording and releasing a four track EP called ‘Heroes’, recorded and produced by Lucas Drinkwater at Polyphonic Recording in Stroud.

In 2022, Will Lawton and the Alchemists recorded an EP titled ‘Alchemy’ at Play Pen Studios in Bristol, produced by Patrick Phillips. The band toured this EP around South West England in February and March of 2023 ahead of the release on 17 March 2023. The video from the lead single ‘Black Bricks’ was premiered on God Is In The TV.

Reviewing Alchemy, The Big Takeover wrote that Will Lawton and the Alchemists are "an eclectic band that draws on all genres, from the grace of the classical world to the mathematics of jazz, from the drifts of folk to the ornateness and complex structures of the progressive world, Will’s piano leads his musical gang through some gorgeous and glorious sonic pastures".

Lawton has had radio play on BBC Wiltshire, BBC Bristol, BBC Somerset, BBC Airwaves Festival, BBC Introducing, BBC Radio Gloucestershire and Scala Radio. His live performance has been described by Slap Magazine as "melodic and inventive…..a truly breath-taking performance" and the music with his band has been described as "gloriously unique and brilliantly exploratory" by Greenman publications and "refreshing, fascinating and exciting" by Ocelot magazine.

== Discography ==
=== Will Lawton and the Alchemists ===
- Alchemy EP, 2023
- Abbey House Session, 2020
- Fossils of the Mind, 2017 (originally released as Will Lawton & Weasel Howlett)

=== Will Lawton and Katey Brooks ===
- Listen To Your Dreams (single), 2022

=== Will Lawton and Joe Holweger ===
- A Strange Thing EP, 2021

=== Will Lawton and Ludwig Mack ===
- Heroes EP, 2021

=== Will Lawton ===
- Salt of the Earth, Vol. 1 (Lockdown), 2020
- The Wood Room Sessions, 2012

=== The Home Fires ===
- This Too Shall Pass, 2013

=== Orangutan ===
- Ember, 2008
- Surprised Cococnut (EP), 2000

=== Brontosaurus ===
- The Monkey and The Whale, 2006

=== The Zennor Project ===
- Twist (EP), 2001
