= Peter H. Thomas =

Canadian businessman

- Born: September 14, 1938 (age 87); Canada
- Occupation: Entrepreneur
- Known for: Founding partner and chairman of Century 21 Real Estate Canada

Peter H. Thomas (born September 14, 1938) is a Canadian entrepreneur, investor, author, public speaker, and philanthropist. Thomas was the founding partner and chairman of Century 21 Real Estate Canada Ltd and Samoth Capital Corporation (later known as Sterling Centrecorp Inc.).

He was also the founder and chairman of Thomas Pride International and its affiliates, including Thomas Franchise Solutions and LifePilot.

== Early life and military service ==
Thomas was born in Canada in 1938. Before becoming an entrepreneur, Thomas served with the Royal Canadian Army Service Corps for seven years, from 1954 to 1961. The first two years were with the RCASE Apprentice Training Company and the last five years with the HQ of the First Canadian Infantry Brigade at Camp Borden, Ontario. He served one year at Camp Rafah, Egypt at the Suez Canal as a member of the Royal Canadian Dragoons Reconnaissance Squadron.

== Career ==
Thomas founded Century 21 Real Estate Canada Ltd in 1976. Thomas served as chairman until he sold his rights in 1987, when the company had $9 billion in annual sales and employed over 8000 sales representatives with over 400 franchises, making it the largest real estate network in the country at that time.

In 1984, Thomas founded Samoth Capital Corporation (SCC), a North American real estate financial services company later renamed Sterling Centrecorp Inc. He served as chairman and chief executive officer for the publicly traded Toronto Stock Exchange Company from 1984 to 2001.

In 2000, Thomas moved to Scottsdale, Arizona, and led the development of the Four Seasons Resort and Hotel, a project facilitated through Thomas Pride International, a parent company of many affiliates that is a private investment and financing firm.

In 2011, Thomas founded and is chairman of Thomas Franchise Solutions (TFS), a private equity firm that specializes by investing in and developing businesses in North America that have franchising as their core expansion strategy. TFS made its first portfolio investment into Dogtopia, a dog daycare, boarding and grooming franchise in late 2013.

== Philanthropy ==
Thomas is the chairman of the Thomas Foundation, a Canadian public foundation which supports charities catering to children, mental health, and education in Canada. Charities supported by the foundation include the Boys and Girls Club of Greater Vancouver, Coast Mental Health Foundation, and Power to Be.

In 2000, Thomas started the Todd Thomas Foundation to raise awareness of and research funds for mental illness. This charity is a component fund within the structure of the Arizona Community Foundation.

In 2002, Thomas founded LifePilot, a non-profit that holds educational workshops for students, prisoners, and individuals.

In 2008 the Todd Thomas Institute for Values-Based Leadership at Royal Roads University, since renamed the Institute for Values-Based Leadership at Royal Roads, was seed-funded through a donation from Thomas. Named after his late son Todd, the school was founded to "sponsor research, visiting professorships, and scholarships" as an addition to the leadership program at Royal Roads.

== Entrepreneurship contributions ==
Thomas was one of the founding members of the Entrepreneurs Organization and served on its board for 20 years. He is the chairman emeritus of the EO advisory board.

Thomas has been a judge at the EO Global Student Entrepreneur Awards (GSEA) for the past ten years in both Canada and the United States. In 2020 he became Chairman of the GSEA's in Canada and continues to contribute to it. Thomas continues to serve as one of the founders of L3.

Thomas has been involved in Young Presidents Organization (YPO) and World Presidents Organization (WPO), and served as a member of the WPO Board.

== Government service ==
- Past chairman of the British Columbia Housing Commission
- Past chairman of the British Columbia Building Corporation
- Past chairman of the British Columbia Government Privatization Review Committee
- Past board member of the British Columbia Pavilion Corporation
- Past director and chairman of the fund-raising committee for St. Michael's University School

== Recognition ==
- 2011 Doctor of Laws, honoris causa, Royal Roads University, Victoria, British Columbia, Canada
- 2010 Adult Caring Award Winner
- 2008 Honor of EO trophy name: The Thomas Trimble Cup honoring Peter Thomas and Bill Trimble as EO's Canadian Pioneers
- 2007 Collegiate Entrepreneurs' Organization (CEO) Lifetime Achievement Award
- 2007 Introduction into the CEO Hall of Fame, Chicago
- 2001 Golden Heart Award for Leader of Distinction, Arizona Women Magazine
- 1998 Ernst & Young Entrepreneur of the Year Award, Pacific Region
- 1996 Honor of EO award initiation: The Peter H. Thomas Award of Merit - presented yearly to a YPO or WPO member who is considered the most valuable mentor to EO.

== Publications ==
- Thomas, Peter H. (1977). The Peter Thomas Sales Course. Re-mastered for CD in 2008.
- Thomas, Peter H. (1984). Windows of Opportunity: 21 Steps to Successful Selling. Key Porter Books. ISBN 0-919493-33-5
- Thomas, Peter H. (1991). Never Fight with a Pig: A Survival Guide for Entrepreneurs. MacMillan Canada. ISBN 0-7715-9139-X
- Thomas, Peter H. (2005). LifeManual: A Proven Formula to Live the Life You Desire. LifePilot. ISBN 0-9739084-0-8
- Thomas, Peter H. (2009). Be Great – The Five Foundations of an Extraordinary Life In Business and Beyond. Jon Wiley & Sons Canada, Ltd. ISBN 978-0-470-16118-0
- Thomas, Peter H. & Jeary, Tony (2014). Business Ground Rules. Carpenter's Son Publishing. ISBN 978-1-940262-22-2
