= Deerwood Country Club =

Gated community in Florida, United States

Coordinates: 30°13′52″N 81°32′58″W

- Interactive map of Deerwood Country Club

Club information
- Location: Jacksonville, Florida, US
- Established: 1960
- Type: Private, member-owned
- Operator: Deerwood Board of Governors
- Tournaments: Greater Jacksonville Open
- Website: www.deerwoodclub.com

Deerwood Golf Course
- Designed by: George Cobb (1960); Brian Silva (2004)
- Par: 72
- Length: 7,223
- Course rating: 75.6
- Course record: 64

Deerwood was the first gated community in Florida, US. After it was established in the mid-1960s, it was the most exclusive residential area on Jacksonville's Southside. The golf course hosted the Greater Jacksonville Open in the late 1960s and early 1970s, forerunner of The Players Championship, and was once the site of talks between President Gerald Ford and Egyptian President Anwar Sadat in November 1975.

== History ==
=== Skinner family ===
Richard Green Skinner came to Jacksonville in 1899 looking for tracts of pine trees to harvest sap to produce turpentine for his marine supply business. Land to the south and east of the St. Johns River was mostly pine trees, sand dunes or marsh; inhabited by wildlife. After 1900, the Skinner family owned close to 40,000 acres (16,000 ha; 160 km^{2}). That land was distributed to his six sons upon his death in the 1920s. The oldest brother, Bright, and two other brothers moved to Tampa and received the land owned there. The acreage nearest to the downtown went to Ben Skinner, who built the Skinner Dairy and Farm, which was closed and developed as Southpoint in the late 1970s.

Chester and Richard were given the biggest tracts because the land was quite remote—miles from existing roads. Richard Skinner, in turn, gave his children, Richard Jr., Bryant, and Dottie his land, including the property on which Deerwood would be built.

=== Deerwood ===
Bryant Skinner built the golf course in 1960-61, designed on a limited budget by notable golf course architect George Cobb. He then constructed the first home in the Deerwood development (his own) the following year. Brother Richard Jr. built his home there in 1963. In early 1962, Bryant began to outline and lay out a unique (for Jacksonville) and exclusive gated golf community that would become Deerwood. Within his rural Florida location he envisioned a neighborhood that incorporated curving roadways, panoramas, and distinctive homes on voluminous lots with large open common areas incorporating lakes, built around a country club that would feature golf, swimming and tennis. There was plenty of room for a riding stable and bridle paths. The development was named Deerwood because of an abundance of wildlife: turkeys, wild hogs, raccoons, bears and many deer.

Bryant was confident that people would embrace it, but to get there from the established city required an 8 miles (13 km) drive down U.S. 1 (Philips Highway), then east for three bumpy miles on a rough dirt road named San Clerc, which would eventually become Baymeadows Road. In 1960, the area south of Beach Boulevard, east of US 1, and extending ten miles (16 km) to the Intracoastal Waterway (approximately 50 square miles) was wilderness consisting of sand dunes and pine trees. In order to solve the problem of their isolated location, the Skinners donated land and convinced the Jacksonville Expressway Authority to build a road that would connect Beach Boulevard to Philips Highway. That thoroughfare, now called Southside Boulevard, opened Deerwood to development. In the 1970s, they gave land for State Road 202 (Butler Boulevard), which opened more of their property, as did the extension of Baymeadows Road, east from Southside Blvd to a point where State Road 9A (now I-295) was built. When the University of North Florida was being developed, the Skinner family granted approximately 500 acres (200 ha) for the first campus of the college.

=== School ===
Jacksonville Country Day School was constructed at the southwest corner of Deerwood in 1960. The school sold their 4.3 acres (1.7 ha) of frontage on Southside Boulevard in 1989 for over $1 million to help pay for capital improvements. The buyers used the property to build two strip centers for retail businesses. The school occupies a parcel of nearly 17 acres (69,000 m^{2}) and has two entrances; public access is from Baymeadows Road, and there is a private drop-off entrance from within the Deerwood gated community.

=== Money ===
Bryant Skinner worked for Jacksonville's Stockton, Whatley, Davin & Co. (SWD), the largest mortgage banking, real estate and insurance business in Northeast Florida. The Skinners had abundant land, but not the financial resources necessary to develop his Deerwood project. J.J. Daniel became president of SWD in 1960 and made a deal to purchase Deerwood's 900 acres (3.6 km^{2}) from the Skinners. SWD financed the development of Deerwood Country Club. Bryant Skinner quit his job at SWD to concentrate on selling homes around the new golf course and started his own firm. The Bryant Skinner Company eventually became one of Jacksonville's most successful real estate development businesses. In 1980, they combined with Gate Petroleum to develop the 250-acre (1.0 km^{2}) Southpoint office park.

Don Davis was named general manager of Deerwood Country Club in 1965, a position he held for over 20 years. In 1978, Davis was promoted to operations vice president of SWD, responsible for all Deerwood Club operations, including the sale of residences and home sites. In 1979, 86 families lived at Deerwood.

=== Area development ===
Prior to the annexation of South Jacksonville in 1932, the city of Jacksonville occupied land on the north and west sides of the St. Johns River. The [[Ortega (Jacksonville}|Ortega]] area was the refuge of Jacksonville's society and old money; a neighborhood of riverfront mansions and aristocratic estates. The Timuquana Country Club, founded in 1923, was their exclusive domain.

The establishment and success of the Deerwood Country Club was the springboard that launched dramatic growth along Baymeadows Road and Southside Boulevard. Retail businesses, residential developments, apartments and commercial properties included "Deerwood" in their name to associate with the club's prestige. An article in the local newspaper in 2005 stated:

"Deerwood became the new place to live, the protected place to raise a family and the coveted community for outsiders to snag a dinner invitation. The Times-Union regularly featured its stylish homes and equally stylish homeowners. Deerwood offered riding stables along with tennis courts, a pool and, of course, what became a nationally known golf course."

Don Davis, a Jacksonville City Councilman for twelve years and State Legislator for eight years, commented, "I think the people on the other side of the river (Ortega) were quite astonished. They felt they were the first-class area in which to live. Then we had this new upstart on the Southside, on a dirt road, in the middle of nowhere."

=== Gate ===
Gate Petroleum purchased the real estate assets of SWD in 1983, which included ownership of Deerwood Country Club. Gate also owned Epping Forest Yacht Club and Ponte Vedra Inn and Club, so Deerwood general manager Don Davis was hired by Gate and continued to operate and manage the club. Throughout the 1980s, the pace of development increased.

In 1989, Gate built a convenience store and filling station at the intersection of Baymeadows Road and Southside Boulevard.

A group of Deerwood homeowners tried to buy Deerwood for $3.1 million in 1990, but were unable to convince enough members to join the effort. At that time, there were 700 members. If 500 of them participated, it would have cost about $7,500 each.

At the end of the 1990s, new federal rules required more efficient use of water, and the irrigation system for the Deerwood golf course required major renovations. Nearly all of the building lots had been sold, leaving no opportunity for profitable income. In 1999, Gate founder Herb Peyton gave the club three choices: the members could buy the club assets; Gate could continue to operate the club for a management fee of 3% of revenues, plus dues; or the club could be sold to a third party. The club members agreed to buy the club assets for $5 million, becoming member-owned. This time, around 700 members agreed to participate, including 100 non-residents. To fund the purchase, refundable equity memberships were offered for $9,000, and associate (non-voting) memberships cost $3,500.

=== Property ===
The Deerwood gated community was initially limited to single family residences for many years. Condominium developments, zero lot line homes, and courtyard communities were gradually included as the development matured and demand for them increased. Homesites ranged up to a 20-acre (81,000 m^{2}) estate, with some 5-acre (20,000 m^{2}) parcels, but the average lot is over ½ acre. Deerwood is now mostly built out, with approximately 900 families in homes priced above $400,000. The intersection of Baymeadows Road and Southside Boulevard, near the Deerwood entrance, is one of the busiest intersections in the city of Jacksonville. The Tinseltown commercial center is a couple of miles north. The Avenues Mall is two miles (3.2 km) south. And there are tens of thousands of people living in dozens of developments off Southside Boulevard and Baymeadows Road. Many homes in Deerwood are over forty years old, so it is not unusual for someone to demolish an older home and build a new custom home. Many of the larger properties are located on the east side of the development in a community known as "The Estates". The entrances are adorned with life-size bronze bucks and does; a reminder of a time when deer were plentiful and people were scarce.

== Country club ==
Operations within the Deerwood Country Club are controlled by the Deerwood Board of Governors (DBG), elected by the Equity membership.

=== Facilities ===
The Deerwood Country Club has an 18-hole golf course & driving range, fitness center, Olympic-size swimming pool, tennis facility with 12 Har-Tru courts (8 lighted), and clubhouse.

The original golf clubhouse, designed by KBJ Architects and constructed in the 1960s, was demolished after a new, 25,000-square-foot (2,300 m^{2}) clubhouse opened in December 2004. The new building is elevated to allow views of the natural beauty of the golf course and surrounding lakes. The facility has multiple private rooms for member functions, a formal dining room and shaded outdoor patio areas.

The Deerwood Golf Course and its irrigation and drainage systems had significant renovation over eight months in 2004 that was long overdue. The painfully flat course was given contours to move rainwater to underground drainage and features that were omitted in 1961 due to financial constraints were added. Bunkers were reconstructed and several of the severe doglegs (bends) were straightened somewhat. A new cart facility and putting green were also included.

Starting in 2026, the golf course is expected to undergo extensive renovations designed by Ponte Vedra Beach-based course designer Erik Larsen, with completion slated for fall 2027.

=== Membership ===
When Deerwood first opened, every resident belonged to the Country Club because membership was connected to property ownership. That changed over the years as homes were bought and sold, and memberships became more flexible based on each owner's preferences. Today Deerwood is proud to call over 200 families that reside outside the gates, Members.

Deerwood Country Club offers two types of memberships opportunities, our Equity members are club owners, and have benefits such as making policy, voting, serving on the Board, tournament placement priority, annual guest passes to share with friends and family, as well as other perks that include the immediate family living at home up to age 26. Associate memberships are also available which include the entire family and children up to age 24 living at home.

Club Facilities:

- Par 72 Golf course with Six sets of Tees, redesigned in 2004 by award-winning architect Brian Silva. DWCC is former host to the Greater Jacksonville Open, now the TPC
- Complete Practice Range, with Two Putting Greens, Practice Bunkers and Chipping Green
- 12 Har-Tru Tennis Courts, ten lit for night play (National tournaments were held at DWCC featuring tennis greats like Billie Jean King, Margaret Court, Arthur Ashe and Jimmy Connors
- Fitness Center with separate weight, cardio and classrooms overlooking Lake Deerwood with a full schedule of Fitness Classes and Personal Training Massage Therapy, Aesthetician and Eyelash services
- Olympic-size Swimming Pool, Splash Pool and Jacuzzi and Steam-room
- Swim Team (Torpedoes) Lessons for swim and strokes for both children and adults
- Kids’ Club providing Child Care, Camps and activities
- Full service Dining with views of the Lake Deerwood
- Private Banquet Rooms for Meetings, Events and Life Celebrations

=== Asset sale ===
To generate funds to reduce the Deerwood Country Club's financial burden, it was discovered that the club owned land that could be sold for development. In the summer of 2005, a local developer paid $2.6 million to purchase 140 acres (0.57 km^{2}) on the north end of the country club—the last large undeveloped parcel, which was mostly wetlands once viewed as too expensive to utilize. The Collins Group plotted 26 1-acre (4,000 m^{2}) homesites on a new thoroughfare named Collins Grove Road for multimillion-dollar homes while reserving 100 acres (0.40 km^{2}) for conservation. The homes were expected to be a minimum of 5,000 square feet (460 m^{2}), with a total cost starting at $1.5 million.

== Gated community ==
Operations within the Deerwood residential community are controlled by the Deerwood Improvement Association (DIA), the community's homeowner's association. Their leadership is elected by the Voting membership.

Deerwood Improvement Association logo

=== CC&R ===
Every deed in Deerwood includes a comprehensive set of Covenants, Conditions and Restrictions which establish and permit enforcement of standards. They enable the controlled access to the community, and authorize the Deerwood Improvement Association to fund their activities and provide infrastructure including recreational areas, drainage, road maintenance and common areas. KBJ Architects developed the design standards for residential developments at Deerwood, which were also used at Amelia Island Plantation.

=== Facilities ===
The DIA manages the 3-acre (12,000 m^{2}) recreation area that includes a community walk, basketball court, multi-purpose ball field, unique playground and pavilion. Other common areas include traffic islands and the two property entrances; 16 miles (26 km) of paved streets and street lights, the storm drainage system and 45 lakes.

=== Membership ===
The DIA is an organization mandated in the Deerwood deed covenants, composed of elected Deerwood homeowners, all of whom are automatically association members. As part of Gate's sale of Deerwood in 1999, ownership of the common areas was transferred to the DIA. At that time, the DIA automatic membership did not include voting rights, which were offered for a one-time fee of $3,000 and were transferable if the member's property was sold. Nearly two-thirds of the homeowners purchased this benefit, all but 84 of these homeowners paid the $9,000 Equity Fee plus the $3,000 fee to join the Club.

=== Functions ===
The DIA budget for 2010 was over $1.75 million. Each of the 920+ homeowners and 29 lot owners were assessed an annual fee of $1,900 in 2010 to support the activities of the DIA.

The DIA board of directors is composed of 11 members, elected to staggered 3-year terms, with officers including president, vice president, secretary, and treasurer. Non-officers chair one of these committees: Standards, Architectural Review, Access Control and Safety, Grounds, Landscape, and Communication/Newsletter.

The DIA engages the services of a professional property manager, whose office handles the day-to-day operations and is the primary contact for residents. The property manager works with all the committees, provides them with assistance and coordinates their activities.

The most expensive support activity was Community Access, which cost over $600,000; Repairs and Maintenance was $400,000; Property Management was $120,000; and finally, Utilities were almost $100,000.

== Neighborhood ==
Deerwood is a gated suburban residential neighborhood located in southern Jacksonville, Florida. Over 80% of the homes were constructed from 1970-1999 but are well-maintained. There are also newer homes, built after 2000. The neighborhood is occupied almost exclusively by owners. Dwellings are mostly large (4-5+) bedroom single-family residences. Almost 40% of Deerwood residents have an advanced college degree including medical, law, Ph.D. or Masters, and the vast major are married. The average income in Deerwood is higher than over 95% of neighborhoods in the U.S.; only 3% of children are under the federal poverty line. Over 70% of Deerwood's workers are in executive, professional or management jobs; more than 22% work in sales & service; over 6% in government jobs; and nearly 3% in tech support or clerical. Over half of Deerwood's working residents commute from 15-30 minutes one-way with almost 85% driving themselves in a personal vehicle. Deerwood is an excellent family-friendly area with good schools, low crime and stability.
