= Don Davis (Florida politician) =

American politician

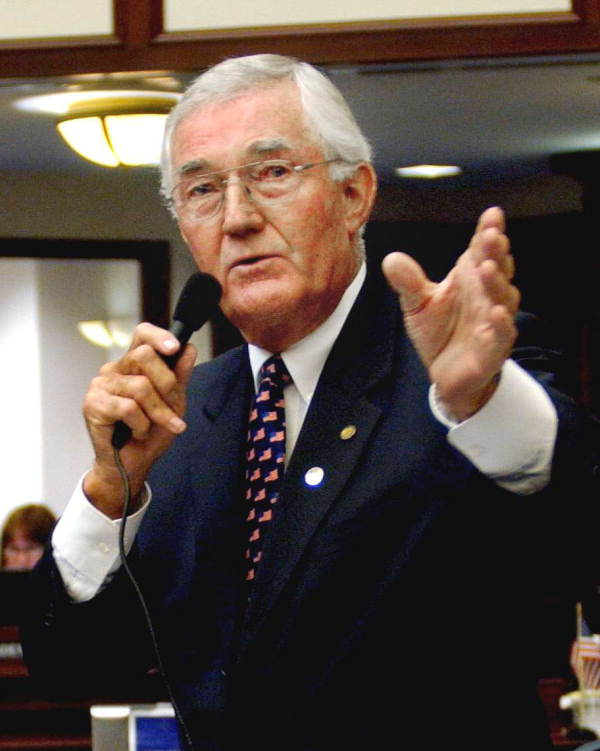
Representative Don Davis on the House floor in 2003.

Donald Robert Davis (June 23, 1931 – April 10, 2008) was an American politician. He served in many roles, from decorated war veteran to petroleum executive, board chairman, association president, Jacksonville City Council president and Florida state legislator.

== Early life and military service ==
Don Davis was born in Okemah, Oklahoma, to Lucien and Lucille Davis. He grew up in Coronado, California, and graduated from Coronado High School in 1949. He attended the University of Redlands in California before serving in the United States Army for three years, leaving the service as a sergeant first class. He was a decorated Korean War veteran, earning the Combat Infantryman Badge, the National Defense Service Medal and the Korean Service Medal with 3 service stars. After returning to the states, Davis would marry Alice Claudia Berry of Miami on December 18, 1954. He completed a degree at the UCLA in 1959.

== From West Coast to East Coast ==
The family moved to Jacksonville, Florida, in 1960 with the Occidental Life Insurance Company (now Transamerica Corporation), where they raised their two sons, Robert (Don, Jr.) and Dean. During several years in the insurance industry as a Chartered Life Underwriter (CLU), Davis established a reputation of integrity and was asked to serve on the Local Government Study Commission (LGSC) which the Florida legislature created in 1965. Their mission was to design a consolidated city/county government; their goal was to reform Jacksonville's corrupt, inefficient government. During this period, Davis changed careers, and was named general manager of Deerwood Country Club, a position he held for over 20 years. In 1978, he was named vice president of Stockton, Whatley, Davin & Co. (SWD), responsible for all Deerwood Club operations, including the sale of residences and home sites.

== Gate ==
When Gate Petroleum bought the Florida real estate holdings of SWD in 1985, Herb Peyton offered Don Davis the position of Vice President of Corporate Relations, which he accepted. He was a Gate brother for over twenty years.

== Politics ==
Don Davis was elected to the Jacksonville City Council in 1987 and re-elected twice, serving 12 years, including two terms as president. Davis then ran for the Florida House of Representatives from District 18 in 1999 and served until his death in 2008.

== Community activities ==
Davis was an active member in many community organizations for 45 years and served on a number of boards. Among his many interests were the following:

- American Cancer Society, past board of directors
- Florida Theatre, board of directors
- Jacksonville 1st Tee, board of directors
- Honorable Company of Red Coats, chairman 1999-2000
- Prisoners of Christ, board of directors
- The Players Championship, chairman 1988
- Gator Bowl Association, president 1987
- American Heart Association
- Mandarin Rotary Club, president 1985
- Jacksonville University Council
- Jacksonville Jaycees, past president
- Jacksonville Chamber of Commerce
- Florida Chamber of Commerce
- Deerwood Country Club
- Big Brothers of Jacksonville, board of directors
- Boy's Clubs of Jacksonville, board of directors
- Northeast Florida Tennis Foundation
- United Way of Northeast Florida, board of directors
- Mazda Senior TPC golf tournament, chairman-1988
- Muscular Dystrophy Association, board of directors

== Death ==
In 2007, Davis was diagnosed with brain cancer. He died at his home in Jacksonville, Florida on April 10, 2008, at age 76. Florida Governor Charlie Crist ordered that state facilities fly their flags at half-staff.

The governor issued a statement: "It is with great sadness that we mark the passing of Representative Don Davis, a great public servant. He served the people of Jacksonville as well as the people of our state with honor and dignity. He will be remembered for his efforts to raise the quality of life for our people by growing and attracting businesses to Florida.

His legislative seat remained unfilled until Ronald Renuart was elected at the next general election in November 2008.
