= Claude Yates =

American business executive

- Born: December 26, 1899; Trenton, Tennessee, US
- Died: October 25, 1988 (aged 88); Jacksonville, Florida, US
- Education: Bowling Green College of Commerce
- Known for: Father of Jacksonville's consolidation
- Spouse: Berta "Birdie" Mink

Claude J. Yates (December 26, 1899 – October 25, 1988), was a Jacksonville business executive in the 1960s who is known as the Father of Jacksonville's consolidation.

== Early years ==
Claude was born in Trenton, Gibson County, Tennessee, the second of five children of farmer Henry "Chess" Yates and Mary W Landrum. He attended the Bowling Green College of Commerce and began working for Southern Bell in 1920. At age 31, the 1930 census listed him as a telephone engineer in Birmingham. Two years later he married his wife "Birdie". During World War II he still worked for Southern Bell Telephone in Birmingham, Alabama. He worked throughout the southeast during his 44 years with the phone company.

== Prelude to Consolidation ==
Yates and his wife moved to Jacksonville in 1953. In the 1956 Jacksonville City Directory, Claude Yates was listed as Vice President and General Manager of the Southern Bell Telephone Company. He had recently retired from Southern Bell and been named president of the Jacksonville Chamber of Commerce in 1964 when all 15 public high schools lost their accreditation. On January 19, 1965 Yates called a lunch meeting of the chamber at the Robert Meyer Hotel to decide on a course of action. Those individuals who attended included: Glenn Marshall Jr., Roger L. Main, W.S. Johnson, Charles W. Campbell, Gert H.W. Schmidt, Edward Ball, C.G. Whittaker, Luke Sadler, B.D. Fincannon, George B. Hills, Jacob F. Bryan III, B.N. Nimnicht, James R. Stockton Sr., J.T. Lane, J.H. Coppedge, Gen. Maxwell Snyder, Harold Meyerheim, Joseph W. Davin, Thompson S. Baker, Richard Lewinson, Henry M. French and S. Kendrick Guernsey. All are deceased. The date was significant because it was the deadline for submitting requests for the upcoming legislative session. At the time, the legislature only met for sixty days every other year. Those prominent business and civic leaders signed a 45-word petition to the Duval legislative delegation of Senator John Mathews and Representative Fred Schultz, that would later be dubbed the Yates Manifesto. It stated:

We, the undersigned, respectfully request the Duval County Delegation to the Florida Legislature to prepare an enabling act calling for the citizens of Duval County to vote on the consolidation of government within Duval to secure more efficient and effective government under one governmental body.

It recommended governmental reforms and consolidation for Duval County's governments.

== Consolidation ==
In response, the 1965 Legislature created the Local Government Study Commission (LGSC) chaired by J.J. Daniel, who later became publisher of The Florida Times-Union and Jacksonville Journal. Lex Hester was hired as the executive director. Claude Yates was among the 50 business and civic leaders invited to participate. Elected officials and government employees were intentionally excluded. On October 1, 1965 the commission was established and given until May 1, 1967 to complete their work. In January, 1967, after 15 months of effort and three months ahead of schedule, the LGSC submitted a consolidation proposal entitled, Blueprint for Improvement. The legislative delegation altered the plan slightly to make it more appealing and ordered it to be placed on a referendum in 1967. Voters had consistently defeated consolidation referendums since 1935.

Yates led the Citizens for Better Government committee, which successfully disseminated information about the advantages of consolidation.

The referendum passed and their Blueprint for Improvement has "since proven to be a national model for urban [consolidated] government", according to the Jacksonville Chamber of Commerce.

== Other work ==
Claude J. Yates was a member and former Chairman of the Board of Directors of the Jacksonville Branch of the Federal Reserve Bank of Atlanta, ca. 1958-1965, appointed by their Board of Governors.,

The Greater Jacksonville Economic Opportunity program began in 1968 as an anti-poverty initiative that started, among other things, project Head Start. Claude Yates was one of its directors.

Years later, Yates was the president of Area Communications Inc., the company that established cable television in Jacksonville. Continental Cablevision purchased Area Communications in 1984 and was the city's cable provider until 2002.

Claude Yates died of a heart attack in Jacksonville on October 25, 1988.

Claude Yates Building

== Honors ==
After his death, the Jacksonville City Council created the Claude J. Yates Outstanding Councilman of the Year Award, which is bestowed annually to the outstanding council member.

The Riverside YMCA at 221 Riverside Avenue was renamed the Claude J. Yates YMCA in January, 2000.

The local government building at 231 E. Forsyth Street was named, the Claude Yates Building when it opened in 1989.
