= St. Vincent's HealthCare =

Hospital network in Jacksonville, Florida

- Company type: Private Company
- Industry: Healthcare
- Founded: 1982
- Headquarters: Jacksonville, Florida, USA
- Area served: United States
- Key people: Tom VanOsdol, Interim President and CEO
- Services: Healthcare
- Number of employees: 4,700 (2009)
- Parent: Ascension Health
- Website: http://www.jaxhealth.com/

St. Vincent's HealthCare, based in Jacksonville, Florida, is a network of three acute-care hospitals, a long-term skilled nursing facility, 30+ primary care centers, nearly a dozen medical laboratories, transportation and prescription services, and a health outreach ministry. It is part of Ascension, the largest Catholic hospital system in the United States.

== History ==
St. Vincent's Hospital was founded in 1916 by the Daughters of Charity and named after the 17th century Parisian St. Vincent de Paul, who started the Daughters of Charity in 1633.

=== Foundation ===
The St. Vincent's HealthCare Foundation is the entity that financially supports the mission of Jacksonville's province of Daughters of Charity. The foundation and network, established in 1982, is dedicated to improving the present and future healthcare needs of the Jacksonville area, and has provided more than $1 million in support every year since its creation.

The foundation stages fund-raising events throughout the year, including the Red Rose Ball, begun in 1982 and Jacksonville's oldest charity ball. The 2008 event was attended by John Travolta and Kelly Preston, who helped collect over $1 million in donations.

John Ash was the celebrity chef at the 10th annual Delicious Destinations event in 2011. The three-day event attracts over a dozen executive chefs from notable restaurants and resorts around the country to prepare their favorite dishes for donors at the Ponte Vedra Inn and Club.

St. Vincent's HealthCare Foundation is also a charity recipient of proceeds from The Players Championship, and conducts a two-day charity golf tournament early in the week known as The Tradition.

=== Baptist merger ===
During the 1990s, for-profit health maintenance organizations such as Columbia/HCA captured a large share from non-profit hospitals. With William C. "Bill" Mason as CEO, St. Vincent's merged with rival Baptist Health in 1995 to become the dominant healthcare provider in northeast Florida and control rising costs. In 1998, John J Maher became CEO and Baptist/St. Vincents Health System had a 40% market share and had cut operating costs by $100 million in three years. However, the arrangement didn't last and a demerger occurred, with both groups going separate ways in 2000.

== Facilities ==
St. Vincent's HealthCare includes 1,081 beds and 4,700 employees. The network's facilities and programs provide a full spectrum of care.

=== The original ===
St. Vincent's Hospital was begun in 1916 when the Daughters of Charity turned the DeSoto Sanitorium into the third hospital in Jacksonville. The institution grew from 42 beds into the St. Vincent's Medical Center Riverside, with 528 beds. As the largest facility in the group, they offer the most diverse health care services in the system.

=== Expansion ===
St. Vincent's Medical Center Southside, a 313-bed acute care hospital, was purchased by St. Vincent's HealthCare in 2008 from Mayo Clinic Florida. The present facility was opened in 1984, but St. Luke's Hospital was begun in 1873 and is the oldest private hospital in Florida.

=== Elder care ===
St. Catherine Labouré Manor is a chronic care facility on the campus of St. Vincent's Medical Center. The complex contains 240 beds, including a special unit for patients suffering dementia from Alzheimer's disease.

Unlike the typical nursing home, the staff tries to maintain a "home-like" atmosphere for the patients, who are called "residents". Many services are available in-house for the resident's convenience.

The Semmes Garden on the St. Johns River, provides walkways through the landscaped grounds leading to fountains, gazebos, and a rose garden.

=== Primary care ===
St. Vincent's Primary Care is a network of more than 30 facilities and 80 physicians throughout the Jacksonville metropolitan area, including Clay, Nassau and St. Johns counties. Each is connected to the St. Vincent's Medical Centers.

=== Laboratory testing ===
There are eleven locations of Consolidated Laboratory Services (Consolidated Labs) in the Jacksonville area, including St. Vincent's Medical Center Riverside and St. Vincent's Medical Center Southside. They process blood and sample testing for all participants in the St. Vincent's HealthCare system and other facilities.

=== Transportation ===
The network also includes the St. Vincent's Ambulance Service, staffed by certified paramedics and EMTs and a fleet of 20 vans and Advanced Life Support ambulances for both emergency and non-emergency transport.

=== Prescriptions ===
Consolidated Pharmacy Services and Seton Pharmacies were created to provide prescription drugs and medical equipment to St. Vincent HealthCare clients.

=== Clay County expansion ===
Ground was broken in June, 2011 for St. Vincent's Medical Center Clay County, the network's third acute-care hospital that opened in 2013. The 98-bed, 4-story building near Middleburg cost $110 million, and is capable of expanding to 250 beds when needed. The company had filed a "certificate of need" with the Agency for Health Care Administration in 2005, and it took several years of negotiation to reach a compromise with Memorial Hospital.

=== Name changes ===
In early 2012, St. Vincent's HealthCare announced name changes for major facilities in their group. St. Vincent's Hospital became St. Vincent's Medical Center Riverside; St. Luke's Hospital was renamed St. Vincent's Medical Center Southside; and the new hospital under construction will be known as, St. Vincent's Medical Center Clay County. In 2019, all facilities were rebranded with the Ascension name.

== Outreach ==
St. Vincent's Community Health Outreach Ministries provides access to healthcare to poor children and families in the Jacksonville area. They sponsor and conduct many activities, including the School Nurse Program, St. Vincent's Mobile Health Outreach, the Seton Center for Women and Infants Health, and the Parish Nurse Ministry.
