= Gate Petroleum =

Diversified corporation in Jacksonville, Florida, U.S.

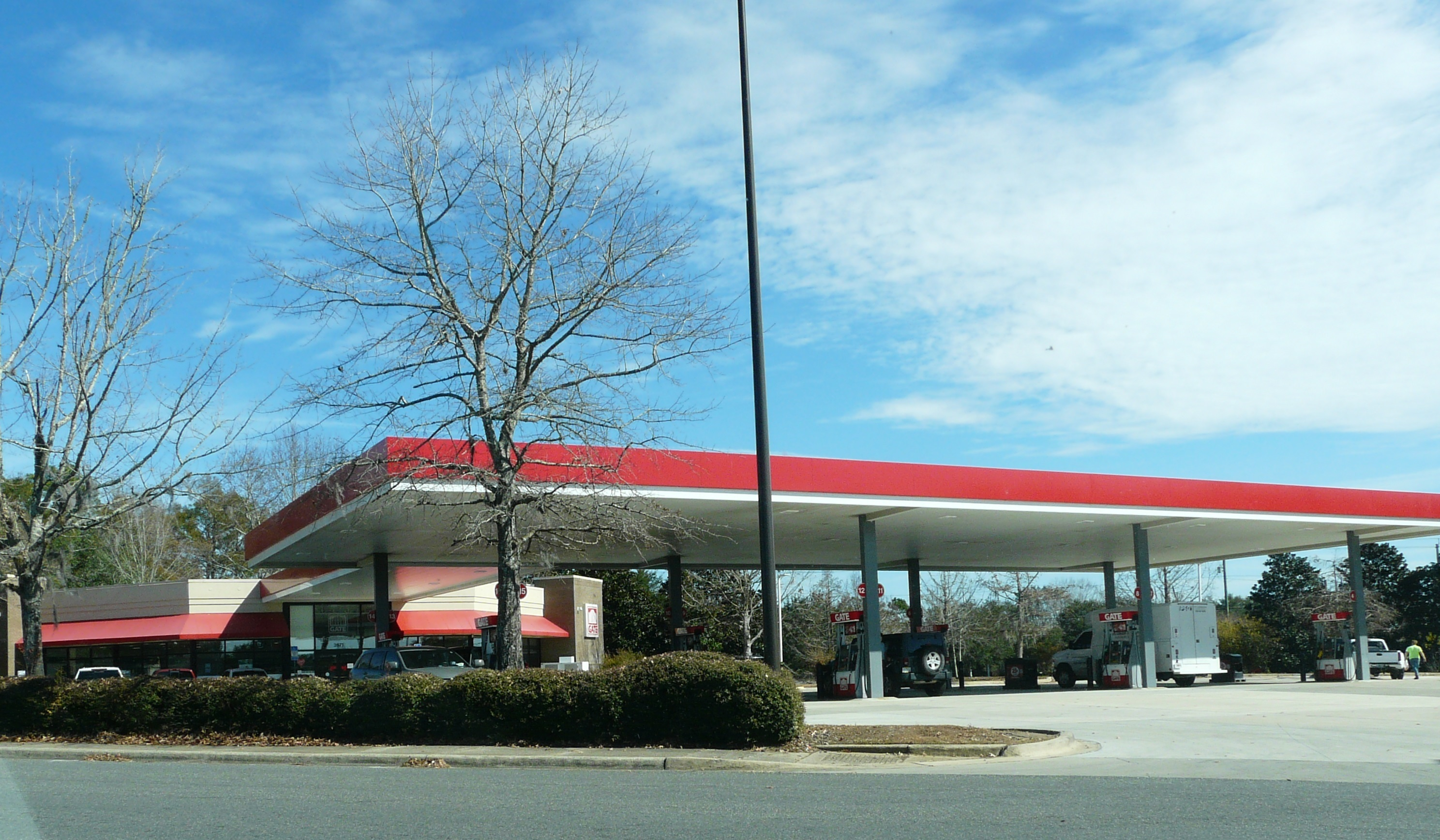
- Gate gas station in Tallahassee, Florida
- Type: Privately held company
- Industry: Convenience store, petroleum transport, precast concrete, hospitality, real estate development
- Founded: July 9, 1960; 66 years ago
- Founder: Herb Peyton
- Headquarters: Jacksonville, Florida, US
- Area served: Southeastern United States
- Key people: John Peyton (President & CEO); Mitchell Rhodes (COO); Herb Peyton (chairman of the board)
- Products: Gasoline, Construction material, Real estate, Food services, lodging, conventions, meetings,
- Revenue: $1.44 billion (2021)
- Number of employees: 3,500 (2021)
- Subsidiaries: List: Gate Marketing; Gate Retail Stores; Gate Express Car Wash; Gate Fleet Service; Gate Fuel Service; Gate Lubricants; Gate Security Gate Hospitality; Epping Forest Yacht Club; River Club of Jacksonville; Ponte Vedra Inn and Club; The Lodge & Club Ponte Vedra Beach Gate Construction Materials; Gate Precast; Gate Concrete Products Gate Real Estate; Gate Lands; Gate Maritime Properties; Ponte Vedra Club Realty; Gate Title Company
- Website: Gate Petroleum

Gate Petroleum is a privately held diversified corporation headquartered in Jacksonville, Florida, the 11th largest in Florida in 2022. In FY 2022, the company ranked No. 338 on the Forbes list of America's Largest Private Companies and had sales of $1.44 billion and employment of 3,500.

== History ==
Herbert Hill Peyton started the company in 1960 with a single gas station on Jacksonville's Northside. The company grew during the 1960s with additional stations in Jacksonville and then the southeast United States. The name "Gate" comes from the city of Jacksonville's slogan at that time, "The Gateway to Florida". In response to the 1973 oil crisis, the company began to diversify and added convenience items to their filling station shelves.

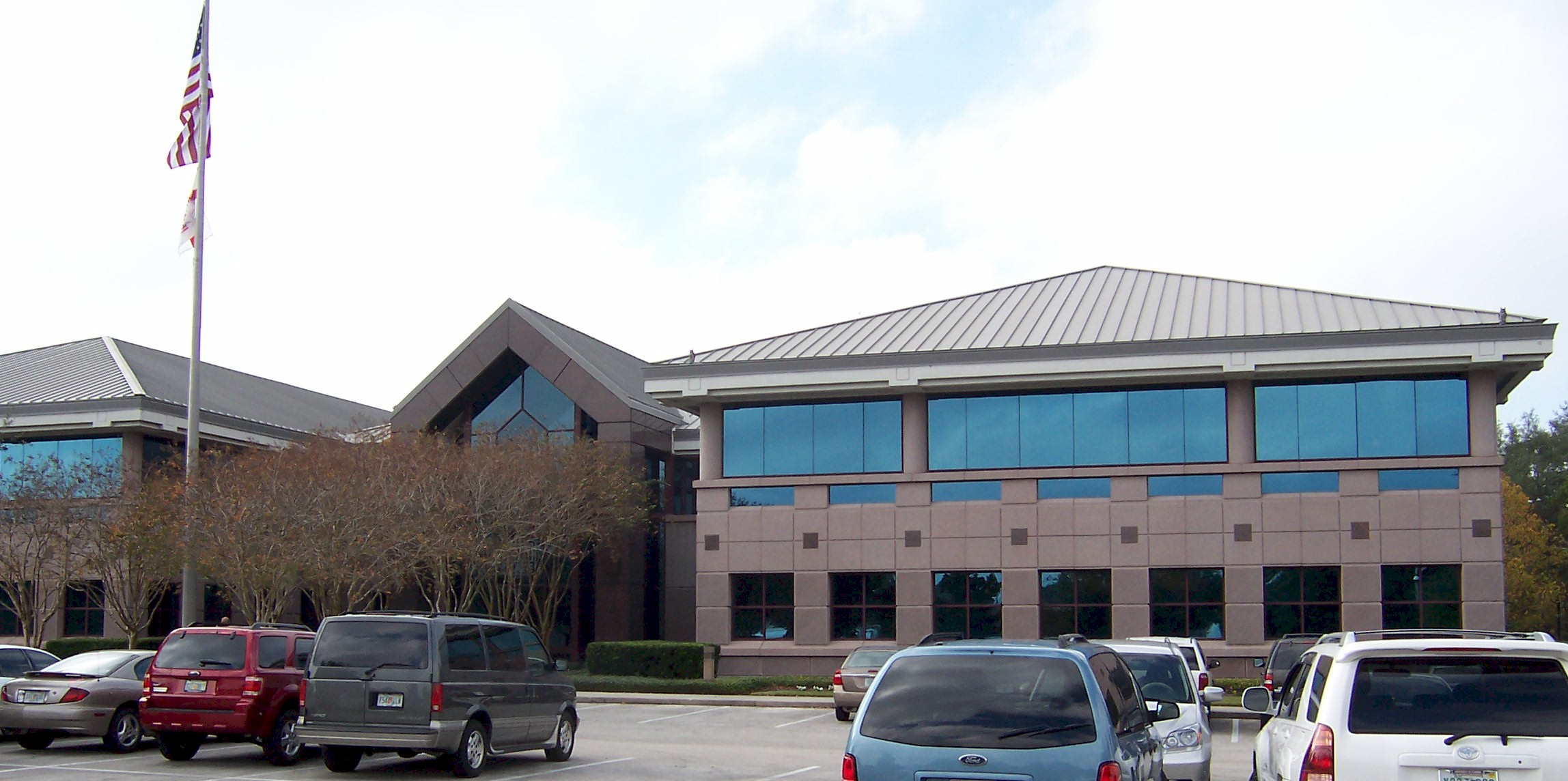
Corporate HQ in Mandarin

Filling stations and convenience stores are still the core business of the company, which operates from a 57,000 sq ft (5,300 m^{2}) corporate headquarters in Sunbeam. Elkins Constructors built the facility in 1999. The Peyton family owns 80% of the company, and the rest belongs to "Brothers": long-term employees (both male and female).

John Peyton, the oldest son of company founder Herb Peyton, took an eight-year leave from Gate to serve two terms as Jacksonville's mayor from 2003 to 2011. John returned to the family business and was named company President when his father, Herb retired on January 3, 2012. Herb remained chairman and Mitchell Rhodes was promoted to chief operating officer. Hill Peyton became Vice President of Marketing. In Jacksonville, Gate is Northeast Florida's 16th-largest private sector employer.

=== Investments and acquisitions ===
- The first alternative investment was a 500-acre (2.0 km^{2}) farm in nearby Hastings, Florida that grew potatoes. Overall, it was a profitable investment, but the asset was eventually sold.
- Gate Roofing Company was created during 1978 in Green Cove Springs, Florida to manufacture asphalt felt. The business was successful and the plant was expanded and operated 24/7 before being sold to Tamko Building Products in 1994.
- In the early 1980s, Peyton transformed the company from a petroleum retailer to a diversified conglomerate. He bought the Florida real estate holdings of Stockton, Whatley, Davin & Co. (SWD), which was then owned by Phillips Petroleum Company for $60 million. The 1983 purchase contained more than 16,000 acres (65 km^{2}) of land in northeast Florida including the Ponte Vedra Inn and Club, parcels at Ponte Vedra Beach, Deerwood Country Club, Southpoint and the Guana tract.
- The first property to be sold was the 8,000 acres (32 km^{2}) of primitive woodlands on the Guana River. The Florida Department of Environmental Protection purchased the property for $49 million that became the Guana River State Park now part of Guana Tolomato Matanzas National Estuarine Research Reserve.
- The initial segment of J. Turner Butler Boulevard (State Road 202) was completed in 1979 and access to that geographical area was improved, facilitating development of the area east of Interstate 95. Gate partnered with the Bryant Skinner Company in 1980 to create the 250-acre (1.0 km^{2}) Southpoint office park and the area northeast of the intersection became Southpoint (Jacksonville).
- When manufacturer Houdaille-Duval decided to eliminate their Florida construction division in 1980, Gate purchased a Jacksonville prestressed concrete plant and five asphalt plants for $10 million. The asphalt plants were resold a year later and Gate offered $1 million for Houdaille-Duval's prestressed concrete plant in Houston, which was worth twice that amount. H-D accepted the offer, and both concrete plants are still Gate Concrete assets.
- Epping Forest, the 58-acre (23 ha) former estate of Alfred I. du Pont, was acquired from Raymond K. Mason in 1984 for $8 million. At the time, Mason was Chairman of the Charter Company, which was facing bankruptcy.
- Westinghouse Electric Company, who jointly developed the east side of Blount Island with Tenneco in the early 1970s at a cost of $125 million in the failed Offshore Power Systems venture, sold the property to Gate for $17 million in 1985. In November 1990, the property's 20-year-old crane, once the world's largest, was sold to the China State Shipbuilding Corporation for $3 million. It was dismantled and shipped overseas.
- Gate purchased 28 7-Eleven convenience stores in Jacksonville and Alachua county in 1990, along with a noncompete agreement for 20 years.
- The Gulf Life Tower, one of Jacksonville's tallest buildings, was on the market for nearly three years with an asking price of $30 million. Gate purchased it from American General Insurance (now American International Group) in 1993 for $9 million, spent several million dollars to renovate it, and renamed it Riverplace Tower. Gate Petroleum sold the building on October 31, 2014, to CFLC Replace LLC in Glen Allen, VA for $29.0 million
- Gate Ethanol and Hamilton County, Florida officials reached an agreement in early 2004 for Gate to build a $160 million ethanol plant on 90 acres (36 ha) north of White Springs, Florida. The plant would have the capacity to produce 50 million gallons of ethanol annually and employ almost 50. In late 2006, the company announced that due to soaring costs of construction and the fluctuation in the price of ethanol, their original plan was no longer viable and would be scrapped. In October, 2007 Gate Biofuels announced plans to construct a terminal at the port in Jacksonville to receive and store Ethanol, which would be blended with gasoline before distribution to gas stations. Nationwide, ethanol production increased 33% from the prior year creating an oversupply because few distributors were prepared to perform the blending process. Another product under consideration was biodiesel, which is made from natural oils. The $90 million, 55 million gallon facility would have both rail and ship capabilities and was expected to be completed in 2010. However, the 2008 financial crisis caused plans to be put on hold, and the project was never resumed.
- In February 2008, Gate acquired 150 West Main Street, a 20-story office building in Norfolk, Virginia.

== Divisions ==
=== Gate Construction Materials ===
The Construction Materials division consists of two companies and operates throughout the eastern, southeastern, and midwestern United States. They are members of the AltusGroup national partnership of companies that provide precast concrete products and services.

Gate Precast manufactures architectural precast concrete at facilities in Kissimmee, Florida; Monroeville, Alabama; Oxford, North Carolina; Ashland City, Tennessee; Dallas, Texas; Winchester, Kentucky and until they closed due to lack of market demand, Little Rock, Arkansas and Sarasota, Florida.

Gate Concrete Products manufactures structural precast and hollow core concrete fabrication at facilities in Jacksonville, Florida and Pearland, Texas. Surplus concrete is donated to non-profit organizations to build artificial reefs miles out in the Atlantic Ocean.

=== Gate Hospitality Group ===
The company owns and operates four private clubs in the Jacksonville area. Management of the four resorts and clubs was consolidated in 2013 under the banner, Gate Hospitality Group. Nearly 900 employees work in the group:

- Epping Forest Yacht Club, originally the St. Johns riverfront estate of industrialist Alfred I. du Pont.
- River Club of Jacksonville, a members-only dining establishment located in the top 2 floors of the 37-story Wells Fargo Center was purchased in March, 2004.
- Ponte Vedra Inn and Club, recipient of the coveted Five Diamond Award, AAA's highest hospitality honor. There are only 6 Five Diamond resorts in Florida, and 30 Five Diamond resorts in the United States.
- The Lodge & Club, an American Automobile Association Four Diamond resort at Ponte Vedra Beach was acquired in late 1996. Club founders Jerome & Paul Fletcher retain minority ownership.

Deerwood Country Club was owned by Gate from 1983 to 1999, when it was purchased by the club membership.

=== Real estate development ===
Gate Lands is the commercial real estate division of Gate, created after the acquisition of SWD. Herb Peyton hired Ken Wilson in 1983 to work with the new real estate partly because Wilson had worked with Joe Davin and SWD properties. Epping Forest, the 58-acre (23 ha) former estate of Alfred I. du Pont, was developed into the Epping Forest Yacht Club and the Epping Forest gated community, comprising 90 – $1 million homes and 80+ condominiums.
Other real estate projects have included Deerwood Park, a 1,000-acre (400 ha) office park on the south side of Jacksonville, the adjacent 250-acre (100 ha) Southpoint Office Park, the Shops at Ponte Vedra, the Shops at Bartram Walk, Riverplace Tower, 150 West Main Street (in Norfolk, Virginia), the 5,400-acre (2,200 ha) Cummer Trust Property in northern St. Johns County and Kendall Town at Regency.

The Gate Outpost is a 100-acre parcel of land effectively surrounded by the Guana River Wildlife Management Area in St. Johns County, Florida. Gate's long-term plans were to create the Vista Tranquilla development of 66 homes in 2016. Opposition to the plan was voiced by hundreds of area residents who attended a zoning board meeting. Gate decided to withdraw their development plans from consideration by the county commission and resume at a later date.

Gate's most recent development is the 1,600-acre (650 ha) Durbin Park in St. Johns, Florida. Plans for the large project included 2,800,000 sq ft (260,000 m^{2}) office, 2,400,000 sq ft (220,000 m^{2}) retail, 350 hotel rooms and 999 multi-family units. By late 2019 much of the retail space had been built and occupied.

Gate Maritime Properties (GMP) handles waterfront industrial land, primarily at Blount Island. In 1986, the United States Marine Corps established the Biennial Maintenance Command (BMC) at Blount Island, Jacksonville, Florida on 262 acres (106 ha) leased from GMP for $11 million per year. The lease between GMP and the Marine Corps was due to end in 2004, so in 2000, the Corp stated their intention to purchase the property when the lease expired. The Marine Corps budget included $115.7 million for the acquisition, but extended negotiations did not result in an agreement. Gate contended that the land was worth between $160 million and $200 million, so in August 2004, the Marine Corps seized 1,100 acres (450 ha) on Blount Island (Gate's entire Blount Island holdings) by eminent domain and paid $101 million. When land is seized for uses that benefit the public, the government is required to pay landowners "just compensation", so Gate asked for a jury to decide the land's value. On November 14, 2005, a jury determined that the government should pay $160 million for the parcel.

Ponte Vedra Club Realty is a full service real estate company in business since 1937. It was acquired from the SWD purchase in 1980.

Gate Title Company offers title insurance and closing services in north Florida. Their first office opened in December 2006 at Ponte Vedra with a staff of 4.

=== Gate marketing ===
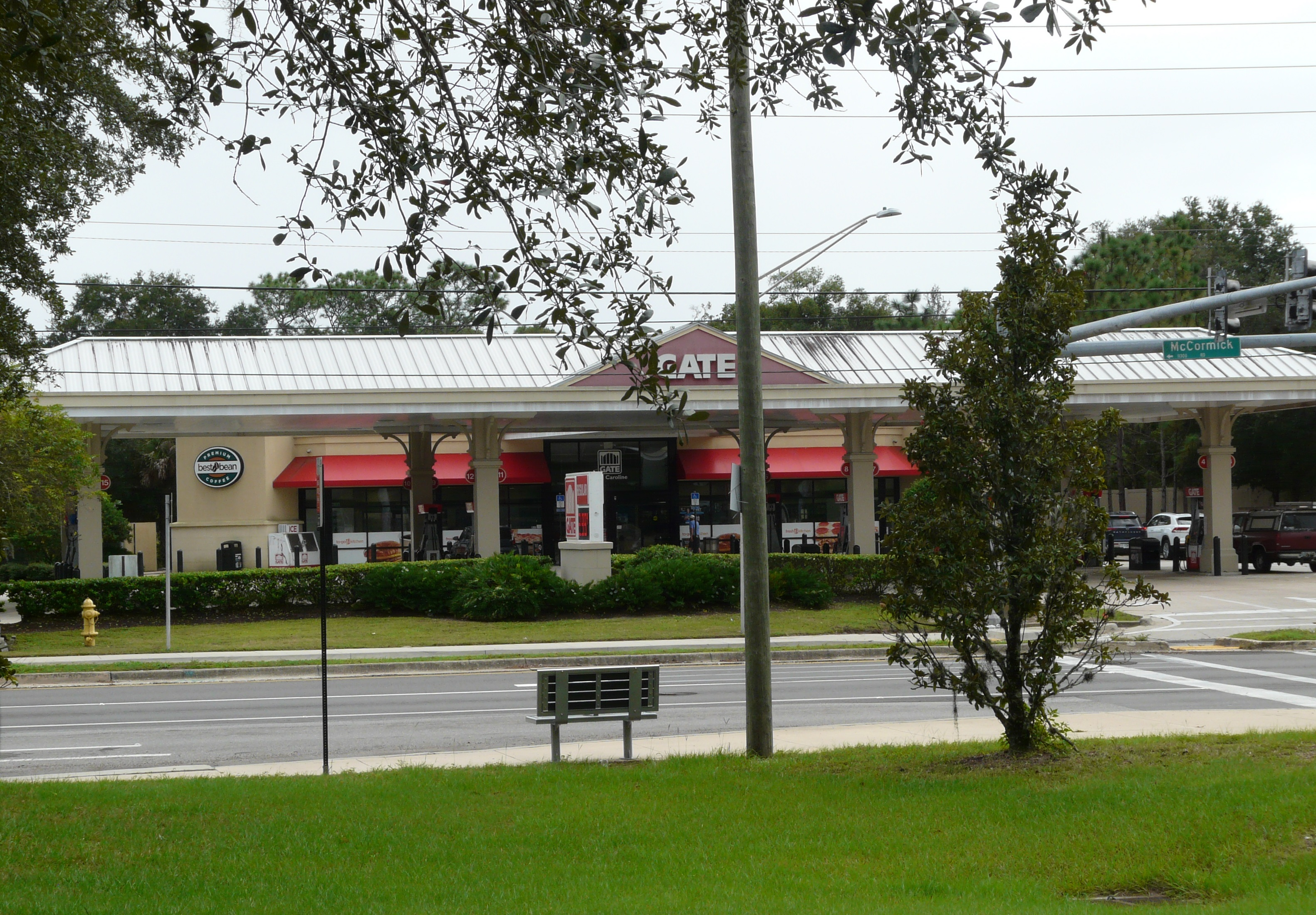
Gate gas station in Jacksonville, Florida

Gate Retail Stores once encompassed 225 gas and convenience stores in 6 states. The retail management uses Retalix software and is split into two divisions. The southern division in Jacksonville includes Gate stores in Florida, and the northern division, managed from Charlotte, controls the stores in Georgia, South Carolina, North Carolina, Virginia and Kentucky. Since 2000, the company's Modus operandi has been to renovate or rebuild the profitable stores, close the marginally profitable locations, and create new stores where a good opportunity exists. Stores in Virginia and Kentucky have since been sold.

As of 2016, the division operated 73 Gate Stores. They also provided fuel to +/-150 dealer fuel/convenience stores. The company had petroleum sales of 1 million gallons per day. In 2021, Gate Stores numbered 72. The company updated their brand name in 2016 by using all capital letters for GATE. Their store format changed in 2019. The average store size had been 2,500–4,000 square-foot (230–370 m2). They began featuring 6,400-square-foot (590 m^{2}) buildings that included an in-store café making fresh sandwiches and pizza, smoothies and iced coffee plus frozen yogurt with toppings.

GATE Express Car Wash was launched in 2016 led by Hill Peyton. Some installations are standalone while others are beside retail store locations. All offer a 3-minute Tunnel car wash and free self-service vacuums.

Gate Fleet Service is a fleet management tool used to control purchases and increased driver accountability. The software has been sold to other petroleum distributors.

Gate Fuel Service distributes fuel throughout Florida, Georgia and the Carolinas, including convenience stores owned by Gate Petroleum and others, deliveries to storage tanks at job sites, marine and bulk fueling. Their location at 9100 Philips Highway in Jacksonville has an 8,800-square-foot (820 m^{2}) office and a 15,000-square-foot (1,400 m^{2}) warehouse. It was purchased in 2006 for $6 million.

Gate Lubricants, initiated in September 2003, supplies lubricants and hydraulic fluid to commercial customers in north and central Florida.

Gate purchased majority ownership of InMotion Entertainment in 2006. InMotion is the largest airport based entertainment & electronics retailer in the United States with over 80 locations in major airports. On October 2, 2013, private equity firms Palladin Consumer Retail Partners and Bruckmann, Rosser, Sherrill & Co. announced the acquisition of InMotion Entertainment from Gate Petroleum.

== Sponsored Events ==
Gate sponsors numerous civic activities and charitable events in the Jacksonville area. The most well known is the Gate River Run, the 15K US National championship race that attracts more than 15,000 runners each year—the largest 15K in the USA. Another big event is the Gate Open, a charity golf tournament for the area's best amateur and professional golfers. The Jacksonville Fishing Rodeo, begun in 2010, is a popular family-oriented event held in June.

== Gate Foundation ==
On September 24, 2008, Gate Petroleum's parent company, Gate Corporation, officially announced the establishment of the GATE Foundation, the philanthropic affiliate of Gate companies. The announcement was made during Gate's annual charity golf tournament at the Ponte Vedra Inn & Club. The 501(c)(3) non-profit, tax-exempt entity was established "to support efforts and services that nurture and protect the well-being of family and community," according to its mission statement. Hill Peyton, another son of company founder Herb Peyton, was named as its first President and Chairman of the GATE Foundation. The foundation's first major gift was $100,000 to Big Brothers Big Sisters (BBBS) of Northeast Florida.

The Gate Open in 2009 provided $75,000 for the Police Athletic League in St. Johns and Duval counties.

In 2010, Gate started an annual in-store fundraising campaign with change drop boxes at cash registers and the sale of $1 donation cards. A total of $36,000 was raised during that April for the American Red Cross. Different charities have been chosen in succeeding years.
