= John Peyton (American politician) =

American businessman and politician

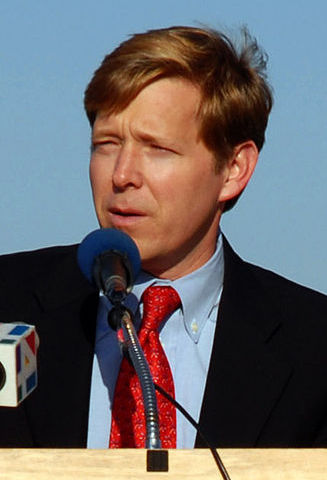
- John Peyton speaking during a groundbreaking ceremony in 2007

6th Mayor of Jacksonville
- In office July 1, 2003 – July 1, 2011
- Preceded by: John Delaney
- Succeeded by: Alvin Brown

President of Gate Petroleum
- Incumbent
- Assumed office 2012
- Preceded by: Herb Peyton

Personal details
- Born: July 28, 1964 (age 62) Jacksonville, Florida, U.S.
- Party: Republican
- Spouse: Kathryn Pearson
- Parents: Herb Peyton (father); Marilyn Stephens Peyton (mother)
- Education: Mercer University
- Profession: President of Gate Petroleum politician

John Stephens Peyton (born July 28, 1964) is an American businessman and politician who is currently president of Gate Petroleum. He served as Mayor of Jacksonville, Florida from 2003 to 2011, when he was succeeded by Alvin Brown. He was the second Republican to be elected to the position since 1888. After his term he returned to Gate, his family business, and succeeded his father Herb Peyton as the company's president in January 2012.

== Biography ==
Peyton's father is Herb Peyton, founder and principal owner of Gate Petroleum, one of the largest privately held companies in the state. They have made a considerable fortune developing, buying and selling land to both the state and federal governments, as well as owning Ponte Vedra Inn and Club and other clubs and resorts, 225 Gate Gas and convenience stores in the southeastern United States, and several other businesses. Prior to his election as mayor, Peyton served as board Chairman for the Jacksonville Transportation Authority; Vice President of Gate and serving as chairman of the Board of Directors for the Jacksonville Symphony and Greenscape of Jacksonville.

Peyton attended Mercer University and earned a bachelor's degree, then graduated from the Harvard Business School Executive Education Program.

A long-time bachelor, Peyton became engaged during his first campaign and married Jacksonville physician Kathryn Pearson on June 1, 2003. They have two sons, John Conner, born in 2005, and Kent Thomas, born in 2007. Peyton is an Episcopalian.

== Mayor of Jacksonville ==
Peyton took office as the sixth mayor of Jacksonville on July 1, 2003. Peyton survived a crowded Republican primary and defeated Democratic Duval County Sheriff Nat Glover, for the seat in a race that was the most expensive in Jacksonville history. In 2007, Peyton defeated community activist Jackie Brown by a margin over 50% to win a second term. Peyton's administration is best known for the Jacksonville Journey, a crime prevention program that invested more than $50 million into suspension centers and college scholarships, summer camps and after-school programs.

== Post-mayoral career ==
Peyton's term of office ended on July 1, 2011, and Alvin Brown succeeded him as the city's first African-American mayor. In a January 9, 2009, interview in the Financial News & Daily Record, Peyton was asked about his plans for 2011 when his term ended. He responded:

I’m going back to Gate and rejoin the family business. I’m looking forward to that. I told dad (Herb Peyton) that he has saved a lot of money because he hasn’t had to pay me for eight years. I think my father is very eager to retire. He wasn’t excited about me running for a second term. If it had been his choice, I would have gone back sooner.

Peyton returned to Gate following his terms, briefly serving as vice president while he got up to speed on the company businesses. In January 2012, Gate announced John Peyton would succeed his father as president, while his father will take a less active role in the company.

In 2016, Peyton was elected as the 2018 JAX Chamber Board of Directors chairman.

Political offices
| Preceded by John Delaney | Mayor of Jacksonville; 2003–2011 | Succeeded by Alvin Brown |
