= Blount Island =

Island on the St Johns River, Florida

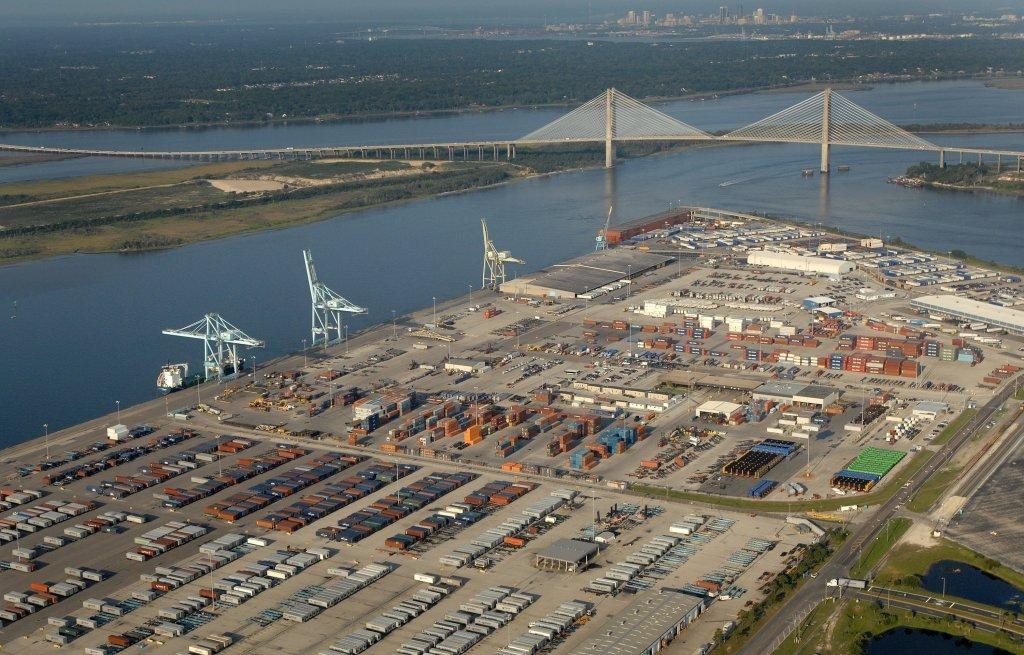
- Blount Island Marine Terminal

- Blount Island Blount Island (North Atlantic)

Geography
- Location: North Atlantic
- Coordinates: 30°24′00″N 81°31′49″W

Administration
- United States
- State: Florida
- County: Duval

Blount Island is an island of approximately 2,000 acres (8.1 km^{2}) on the St. Johns River in Jacksonville, Florida, nine nautical miles (16.7 km) west of the Atlantic Ocean. One of three public cargo facilities at the Port of Jacksonville is located there, and it is also the site of the United States Marine Corps Blount Island Command.

== History ==
Before the Port Authority obtained Blount Island, the island was named Goat Island. The Bartchlett family lived on the island for over 35 years. They were there during World War II. They observed ships coming through the channel still burning from action in the war. The Dames Point Cut that straightened the river was signed off by George Bartchlett allowing the dredging to begin. He raised seven children and four grandchildren on this island. At that time the only way to the island was by boat. The house once set on the Dames Point side of the island. The children going to school caught the bus at the end of Dames point road. There is a lot of history to this island that once was a family's home. The St. Johns River between Jacksonville and the Atlantic Ocean twists and turns. That was not a problem until shipping companies began using bigger and bigger freighters after World War II. The United States Army Corps of Engineers created the Dames Point Cut, a straight channel that provided an alternative to the river's natural course, which contained several of the sharpest turns in the river. Four marsh islands received the dredging spoil and became Blount Island. The property was turned over to the Jacksonville Port Authority (JAXPORT) for development. The west side of the island was developed and used for freight operations after the Jacksonville Port Authority (JAXPORT) was established in 1963. Railroad access to the site was added in the late 1960s.

=== Floating power ===
Offshore Power Systems (OPS) was a 1970 joint venture between nuclear power company Westinghouse Electric and ship builder Tenneco. The company intended to manufacture and assemble floating nuclear power plants. The east half of the island was unused and mostly marsh until OPS obtained 850 acres (3.4 km^{2}) of land from JAXPORT, destroyed the marsh, and replaced it with sterile fill. Utilities, roads and other infrastructure were established and the world's largest crane, 38 stories tall and capable of lifting 990 metric tons, was purchased and installed for $15 million. A total of $125 million was invested in development of the site and improvements, but no power plants were ever built and the company closed in 1984.

Westinghouse sold their Blount Island property to Gate Petroleum for $17 million in 1985.

=== Gate Petroleum ===
The following year, Gate Petroleum leased a portion of their Blount Island property to the United States Marine Corps. In 1989, the U.S. Navy signed a $5 million per year contract with Gate to dock two ships at Blount Island on new piers built for that purpose. The construction, which would require dredging the channel, was opposed by a group of fishermen, environmentalists and nearby residents who owned riverfront property. Gate's project was consistent with the city's master plan for the industrial area, but Gate chose to abandon the development and requested that the Navy cancel the contract for public relations reasons.

In November 1990, Gate sold the 20-year-old Offshore Power Systems crane for $3 million to the China State Shipbuilding Corporation and their workers dismantled it for shipment overseas.

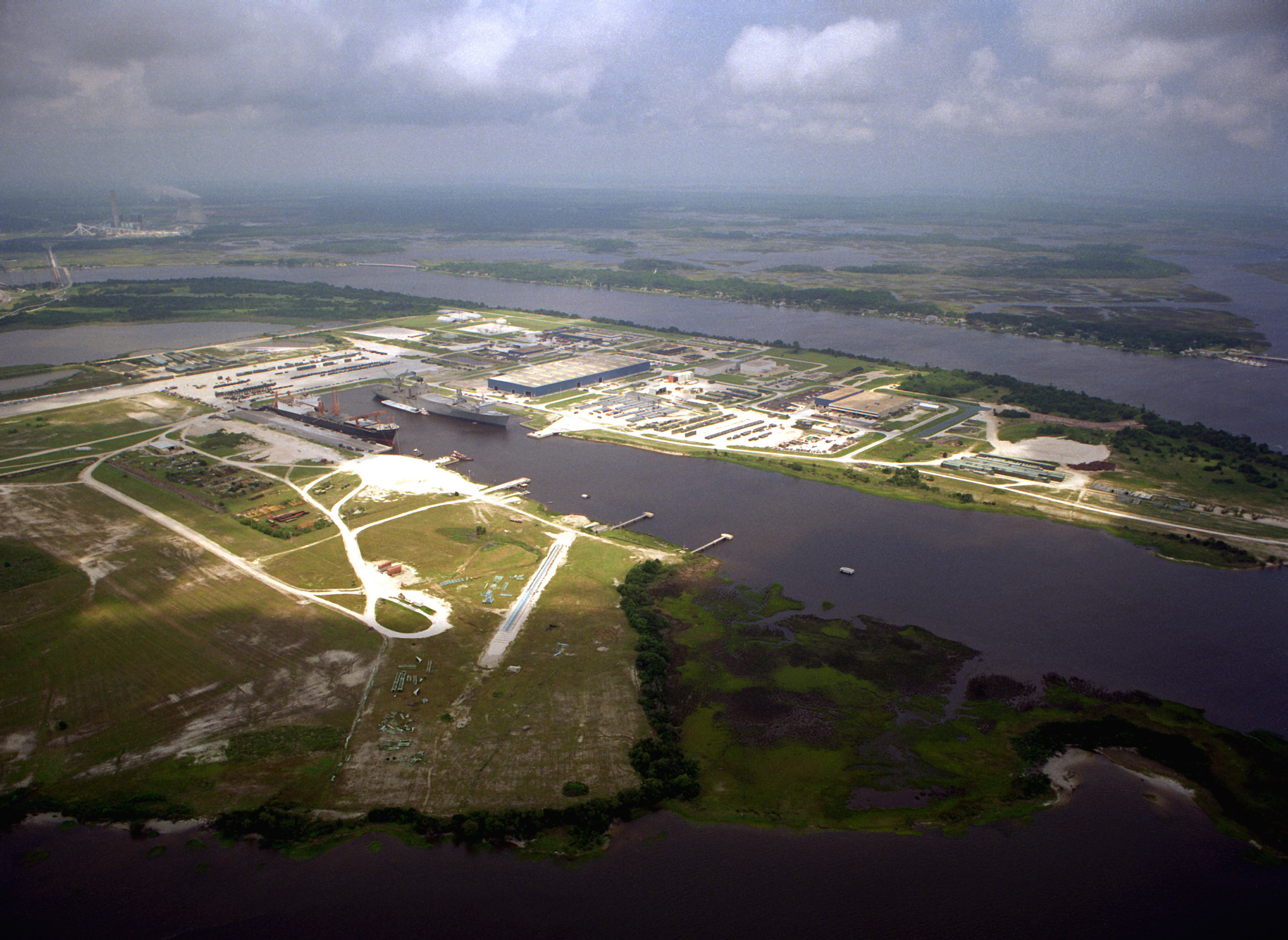
Blount Island Command in 1994

=== Marines ===
Blount Island Command supports three Maritime Prepositioning ship squadrons (each with multiple ships) strategically located in the Mediterranean Sea, the Indian Ocean and the Western Pacific Ocean. The squadron's ships contain enough food, equipment, supplies, and ammunition to support a Marine Air-Ground Task Force for one month.

In 1986, the U.S. Marine Corps established the Biennial Maintenance Command (BMC) on the east side of Blount Island using 262 acres (1.06 km^{2}) leased from Gate Maritime Properties for $11 million per year. The lease between Gate and the Marine Corps was due to end in 2004, and in 2000, the Corp stated their intentions to purchase the property when the lease expired. The Marine Corps budget included $115.7 million for the acquisition, but extended negotiations did not result in an agreement. Gate contended that the land was worth between $160 million and $200 million, so in August 2004, the Marine Corps seized 1,100 acres (4.5 km^{2}) on Blount Island (Gate's entire Blount Island holdings) by eminent domain and paid $101 million (later increased to $106 million). In the United States, when land is seized by eminent domain for "public use", the government is required to pay landowners "just compensation", so Gate asked for a jury to decide the land's value. On November 14, 2005, a jury determined that the government should pay $162 million for the parcel.

== Public facility ==
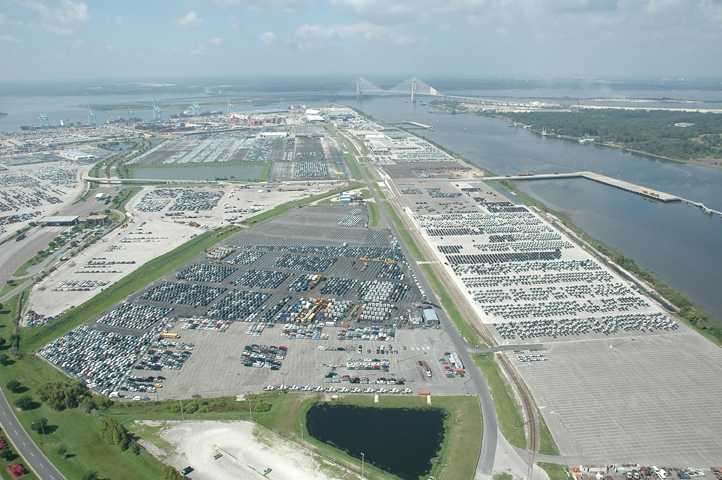
Blount Island RoRo port and container port

The 754-acre (3.05 km^{2}) Blount Island Marine Terminal is JAXPORT's largest container facility, handling 80% of all container cargo at the port, but also processes Ro/Ro, heavy lift, breakbulk and liquid bulk cargoes. The terminal has 6,600 linear feet (2,012 m) of deep water berths.

Blount Island has one 112-ton whirly crane and eight container cranes (five 50-ton cranes, one 45-ton crane and two 40-ton cranes); two of the 50-ton cranes were purchased in 2010. The terminal also offers 240,000 square feet (22,000 m^{2}) of transit shed space and a 90,000-square-foot (8,400 m^{2}) Container Freight Station for cross-dock efficiency.

In addition to import operations, several companies provide freight service to the Caribbean, including Trailer Bridge and Crowley Maritime.

=== Rail ===
Over 30% of the terminal's shipments utilize on-dock rail service provided by CSX Corporation directly. JAXPORT owns the 14 miles (23 km) of track, which was laid down in the late 1960s. In the Fall of 2009, the Port Authority received a grant of almost $6 million to improve the Blount Island rail system, which was also utilized by the U.S. Marine Corps' terminal. The United States Department of Transportation required matching funds of $1.7 million from JAXPORT. The project laid 3½ miles of new track and replaced 12,000 aging crossties.

=== Truck ===
The island has highway access nearby. Interstate 295 is located one mile (1.6 km) west; Interstate 95 is five minutes away with Interstate 10 on the west side of the I-295 beltway. Interstate 75 is a one-hour drive west.

=== Southeast Toyota ===
On April 25, 2022 Jaxport and Southeast Toyota Distributors (SET) jointly announced plans for SET to lease a new vehicle processing facility at Bount Island. They had leased space at the Talleyrand Terminal since 1968. The new site will allow SET to redesign their operation for efficiency and increased capacity. Associate amenities available at other Jacksonville SET facilities will be added at the new location, expected to be completed by the end of 2024. Jaxport is currently working with the Florida Department of Transportation on a $45 million project to expand capacities at Blount Island. SET will contribute $16.5 million of that cost. The facility will then accommodate larger ships and permit two ships to berth simultaneously. The new site will have two vehicle processing buildings with a combined 250,000-square-foot (23,000 m^{2}) versus 200,000-square-foot (19,000 m^{2}); 88 acres (36 ha) versus 73 acres (30 ha) (non-contiguous) plus new CSX rail connections.
