= 150 West Main Street =

Coordinates: 36°50′49″N 76°17′36.2″W

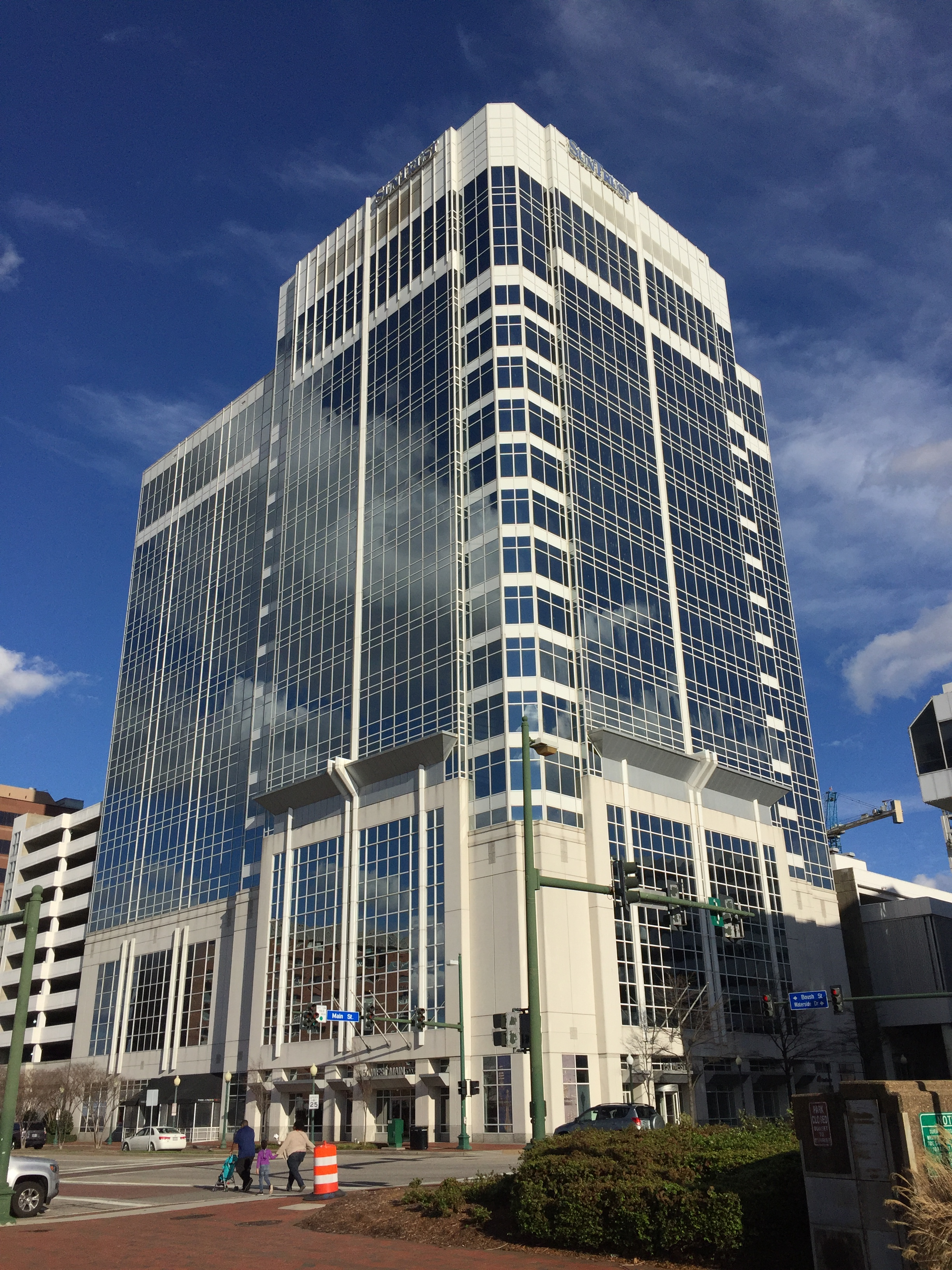
- View of the tower from across the Elizabeth River
- Interactive map of the 150 West Main Street area

General information
- Status: Completed
- Type: Office
- Location: 150 West Main Street; Norfolk, Virginia 23510
- Completed: 2002
- Owner: Gate Petroleum

Height
- Roof: 292 ft (89 m)
- Top floor: 21

Technical details
- Floor count: 20
- Floor area: 234,000 sq ft (21,700 m^{2})

Design and construction
- Architect: CMSS Architects
- Developer: City of Norfolk, Robert Stanton & Tom Robinson

150 West Main Street is the fourth tallest building in Downtown Norfolk, Virginia, United States. Norfolk's highest rated restaurant, Todd Jurich's Bistro, is located on the building's ground floor.

== History ==
In 2000, Norfolk's office vacancy rate was well below 10%. The development was a joint project between the city of Norfolk and a limited liability company headed by local businessmen Tom Robinson (Robinson Development Group) and Robert Stanton (Stanton Partners, Inc.). The 840-space parking facility, which occupies the second through tenth floors, was financed by the city of Norfolk. When the highrise opened in 2002, a large number of tenants in older properties, especially the Bank of America Center, built in 1967, moved to the new Class "A" building when their leases expired.

== Structure ==
The 20-story tower contains 234,000 sq ft (21,700 m^{2}) of leasable space, managed by CBRE Group.

A branch office of Truist occupies part of the ground floor, and their name is on the banner sign at the top of the building. Todd Jurich's Bistro, a full-service restaurant established in 1992, changes its menu regularly based on the availability of fresh seasonal ingredients. Their wine selection is notable, and they have several private dining rooms. The lobby features original artwork on display, and a 2,000 sq ft (190 m^{2}) penthouse is available to tenants for conferences and meetings. The building has 24/7 security and a backup generator provides electricity during power outages.

In 2005, the original investors sold the property to the St. Joe Company for $50.5 million.

On August 7, 2007, St. Joe sold the 98% leased building to Eola Capital, LLC for $56 million.

Finally, Gate Petroleum acquired the building on February 8, 2008. At the time, the occupancy rate was 97% with just three vacant suites. The majority of lessees are legal and financial businesses, including dozens of lawyers, Certified Public Accountants, and prominent firms: Troutman Sanders, Kaufman & Canoles, Virginia Natural Gas, CB Richard Ellis brokerage and Wachovia Securities.

== See also ==
- List of tallest buildings in Norfolk, Virginia
