= J. Turner Butler =

American politician (1882–1969)

Member of the Florida House of Representatives for Duval County
- In office 1911–1913

Member of the Florida Senate from the Duval County district
- In office 1918–1925; 1931–1941

Personal details
- Born: April 27, 1882 Levy County, Florida, US
- Died: September 29, 1969 (aged 87) Tuscaloosa, Alabama, US
- Party: Democrat
- Education: Stetson University
- Occupation: Attorney

James Turner Butler (April 27, 1882 – September 29, 1969) was an American politician in the state of Florida. He served in the Florida House of Representatives and Florida Senate, including as President of the Florida Senate as a Democrat.

== Career ==
Butler served in the Florida House of Representatives from 1911 to 1913 as a member from Duval County. He served in the Florida Senate from 1918 to 1925 and from 1931 to 1941, and was its president from 1939 to 1941. In 1939, he served as President of the Florida Senate.

A lawyer, he resided in Jacksonville, Florida; the J. Turner Butler Boulevard there is named in his honor.
