= Bobby Weed =

American golf course designer and builder (born 1955)

- Born: Robert Carl Weed Jr. April 13, 1955 (age 71); Irmo, South Carolina, U.S.
- Education: Presbyterian College, 1974-75 Lake City Community College, 1976-77
- Occupation: Golf course designer
- Notable work: Grove XXIII; Spanish Oaks; The Olde Farm; Tournament Players Club
- Spouse: Leslie Weed
- Children: 3
- Website: www.bobbyweed.com

Robert Carl Weed Jr. (born April 13, 1955), known as Bobby Weed, president of Bobby Weed Golf Design ("BWGD"), is an American golf course architect, designer and builder. His firm specializes in design, renovations and repurposing. A protégé of Pete Dye, he resides in Ponte Vedra Beach, Florida. Weed is a member of the American Society of Golf Course Architects (ASGCA), the Golf Course Superintendents Association of America (GCSAA) and the Florida Turfgrass Association.

== Education and professional career ==
During his junior year at Irmo High School, Weed convinced his father to convert their family-owned bean fields into Weed Hill Driving Range. Dustin Johnson, Wesley Bryan, Lauren Stephenson and 70 others who made their careers by playing professionally, becoming superintendents or golf course architects credit Weed Hill Driving Range for their introductions to golf.

Weed was a member of the Presbyterian College men's golf team for two seasons (1974–75). He then transferred to Lake City Community College (now Florida Gateway College) to focus on their Golf Course Operations and Landscape Technology program.

Weed began his professional career in an extended apprenticeship with Pete Dye. Dye would become Weed's mentor, confidant and best friend.

Ahead of the inaugural 1982 Tournament Players Championship (now The Players Championship) at the Tournament Players Club at Sawgrass (TPC Sawgrass), Dye and Weed designed and constructed the Stadium Course, which became the permanent home of The Players Championship.

Following significant renovations to the Stadium Course by Dye and Weed as directed by PGA TOUR Commissioner Deane Beman, Weed was hired in 1983 by the PGA TOUR as a Certified Golf Course Superintendent at TPC Sawgrass.

From 1987 to 1996, Weed served as the PGA TOUR's Chief Designer. He was responsible for many of today’s best-known TPC venues, which continue to host prominent professional events.

From 1985 to 1995, Weed held certification through the GCSAA as a Certified Golf Course Superintendent.

In 1994, Weed formed Bobby Weed Golf Design. His firm's new and renovated courses are consistently ranked at the top of their respective design categories. Notable original designs and renovations include Grove XXIII (Hobe Sound, Fla.) for Michael Jordan, The Olde Farm (Bristol, Va.), Spanish Oaks Golf Club (Bee Cave, TX), TPC River Highlands (Cromwell, CT), Medalist Golf Club (Jupiter, Fla.), Timuquana Country Club (Jacksonville, Fla.), Grandfather Golf & Country Club (Linville, NC), New Orleans Country Club (New Orleans, La.) and the Ponte Vedra Inn & Club (Ponte Vedra Beach, Fla.).

Along with his wife, Weed is a co-founder and board member of HEAL! (Healing Every Autistic Life). The HEAL Foundation is a non-profit organization based in Ponte Vedra Beach, Florida, serving individuals and families living with autism spectrum disorders. Weed has a nonverbal autistic daughter. She has experienced much growth and success with the support of HEAL.

== Selected course portfolio ==
Weed started his own company in 1994 — Bobby Weed Golf Design — and has designed or redesigned an impressive list of highly regarded courses. A partial list of his work follows:

=== Original ===
- Grove XXIII – Hobe Sound, Florida
- Spanish Oaks Golf Club – Bee Cave, Texas
- StoneRidge Golf Club – Stillwater, Minnesota
- The Olde Farm – Bristol, Virginia
- The Golf Course at Glen Mills - Glen Mills, Pennsylvania

=== Original, Weed/Dye ===
- Amelia Island Plantation – Ocean Links – Fernandina Beach, Florida
- Country Club of Landfall – Dye Course – Wilmington, North Carolina
- Dye Preserve Golf Club – Jupiter, Florida
- Long Cove Club – Hilton Head Island, South Carolina

=== Tournament ===
- TPC Las Vegas – Las Vegas, Nevada
- TPC Mito (now Mito Kourakuen Country Club) – Mito, Japan
- TPC Sawgrass – Valley Course – Ponte Vedra Beach, Florida
- TPC Sawgrass – Stadium Course – Ponte Vedra Beach, Florida
- TPC Summerlin – Las Vegas, Nevada
- TPC Tampa Bay – Lutz, Florida
- TPC River Highlands – Cromwell, Connecticut
- World Golf Village – The Slammer & Squire – St. Augustine, Florida

=== Renovation ===
- Culver Academies Golf Course – Culver, Indiana
- Grandfather Golf and Country Club – Linville, North Carolina
- Linville Golf Club – Linville, North Carolina
- Linville Ridge – Linville, North Carolina
- Medalist Golf Club – Hobe Sound, Florida
- New Orleans Country Club – New Orleans, Louisiana
- Palma Ceia Golf and Country Club – Tampa, Florida
- Pleasant Valley Country Club – Little Rock, Arkansas
- Ponte Vedra Inn and Club – Ocean Course – Ponte Vedra Beach, Florida
- Timuquana Country Club – Jacksonville, Florida
- White Manor Country Club – Malvern, Pennsylvania

=== Renovation, Weed/Dye ===
- The Club at Quail Ridge – South Course – Boynton Beach, Florida
- TPC Sawgrass – Stadium Course – Ponte Vedra Beach, Florida

== Selected honors and awards ==
- 2022 – Sports Illustrated Most Innovative Course Design – Stillwater Golf & Country Club
