= St. Johns Town Center =

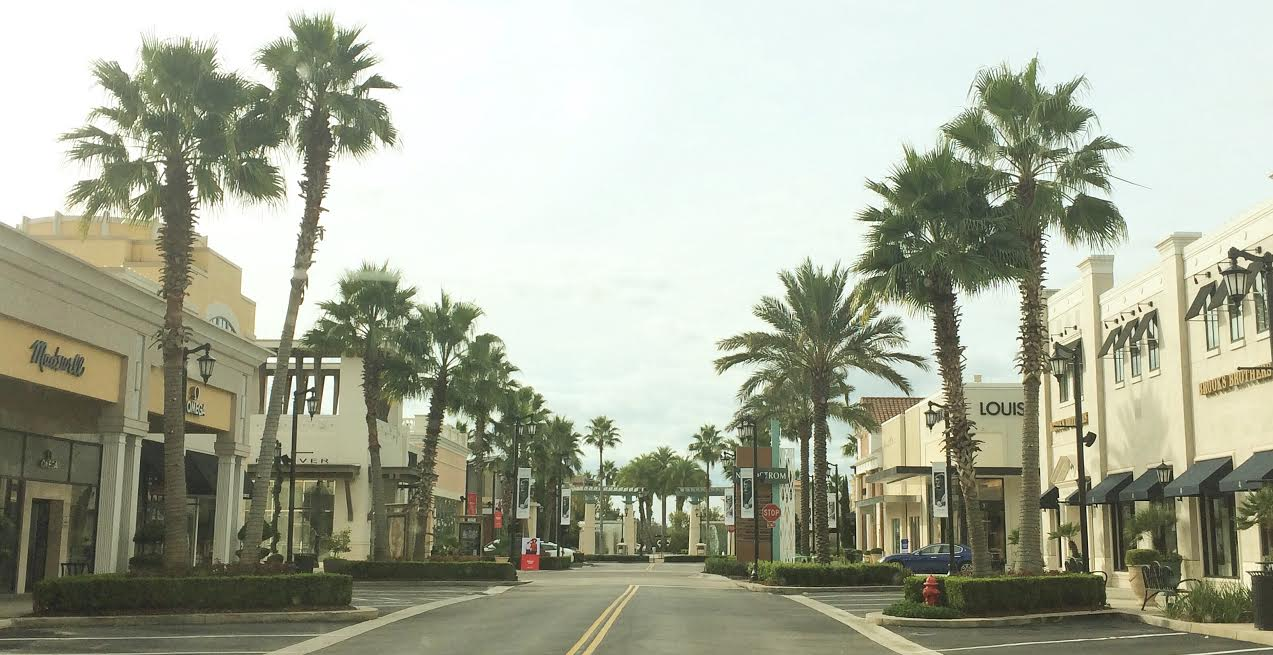
- Location: Jacksonville, Florida, USA
- Coordinates: 30°15′28″N 81°31′31″W
- Address: 4663 River City Dr
- Opened: March 18, 2005; 21 years ago
- Manager: Simon Property Group
- Owner: Simon Property Group (50%)
- Num. of stores: 167
- Num. of anchor tenants: 4
- Floor area: 1,391,569 square feet (129,281.0 m^{2})
- Floors: 2
- Parking: 5,000
- Website: St. Johns Town Center

The St. Johns Town Center is a super-regional open-air mall in southeast Jacksonville, Florida. It opened its doors on March 18, 2005 with over 167 stores, many of which were new to the Jacksonville market at the time. The 51.2-acre (0.207 km^{2}) mall is located at the intersection of J. Turner Butler Boulevard and the Interstate 295 East Beltway, with the University of North Florida's campus situated across I-295 from the center. The mall is anchored by Nordstrom, Dillard's, Target, and a flagship Dick's Sporting Goods.

The mall was and continues to be a huge catalyst for new retailers to enter the market. Many high-end retailers have their sole location in Northeast Florida at St. Johns Town Center. Some of these stores include Gucci, Louis Vuitton, Tiffany & Co., Lilly Pulitzer, Tory Burch, Vineyard Vines, Psycho Bunny, Free People, Lucky Brand Jeans, Banana Republic, J.Crew, Oakley, Steve Madden, UNTUCKit, Sephora, Apple, and Anthropologie.

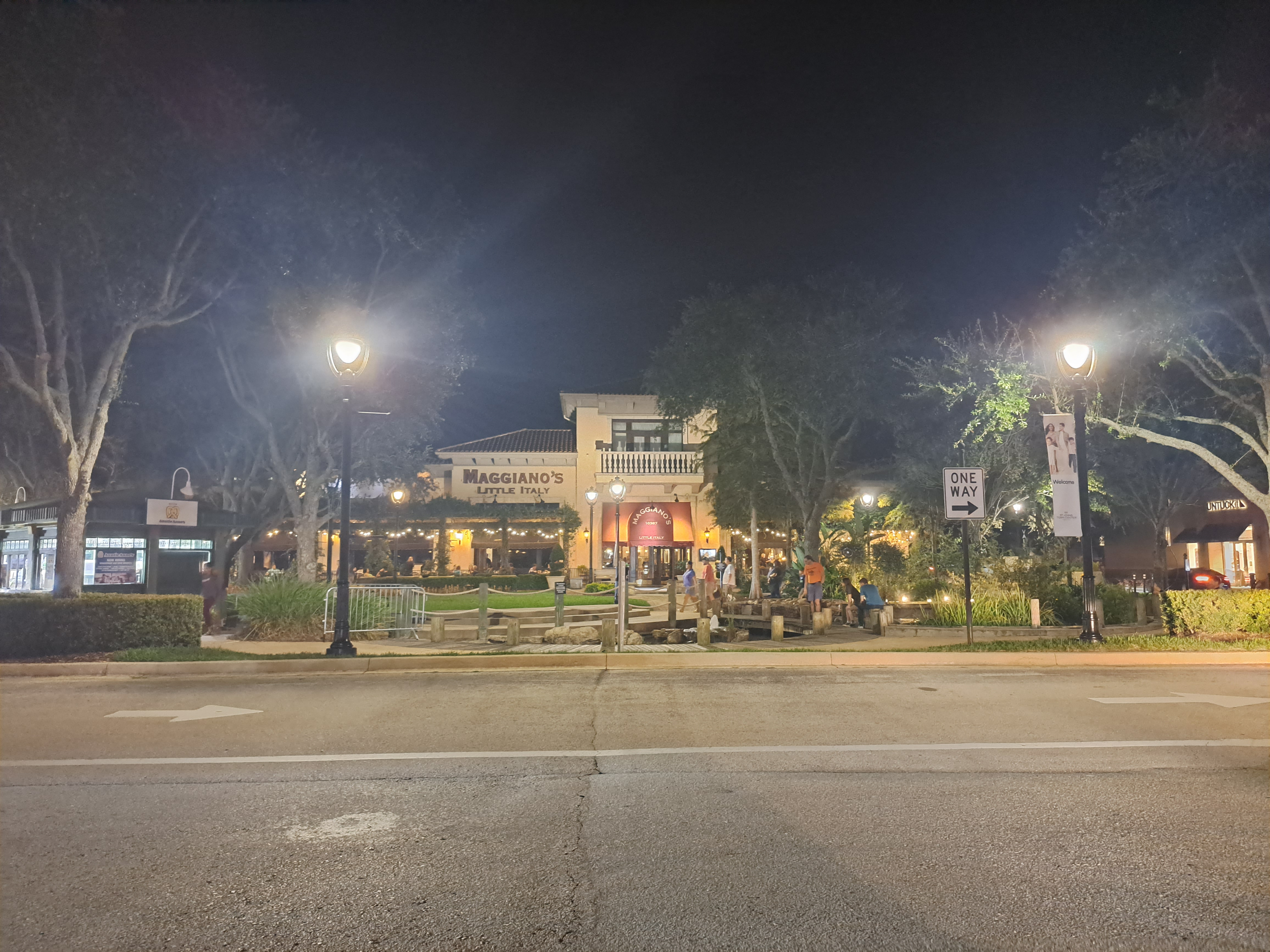
The center of the St. Johns Town Center at night with Maggiano's Little Italy notably on the front

== 2007 expansion ==
A 228,000 sq ft (21,200 m^{2}) expansion was opened to the public on October 26, 2007. It consists of about 40 retailers and 4 restaurants. Some of the tenants of this expansion include Aldo, Barnes & Noble, Brooks Brothers, Clarks, Coach, Lacoste, Louis Vuitton, MAC Cosmetics, Pottery Barn, Swarovski, Talbots, Tommy Bahama, Urban Outfitters, and West Elm. In 2008 True Religion, Kate Spade, The Capital Grille and J. Alexander's were opened.

== 2014 expansion ==
Nordstrom opened its first store in Northeast Florida at the St. Johns Town Center. Eight other stores would open two days prior, including a 2-story Arhaus.

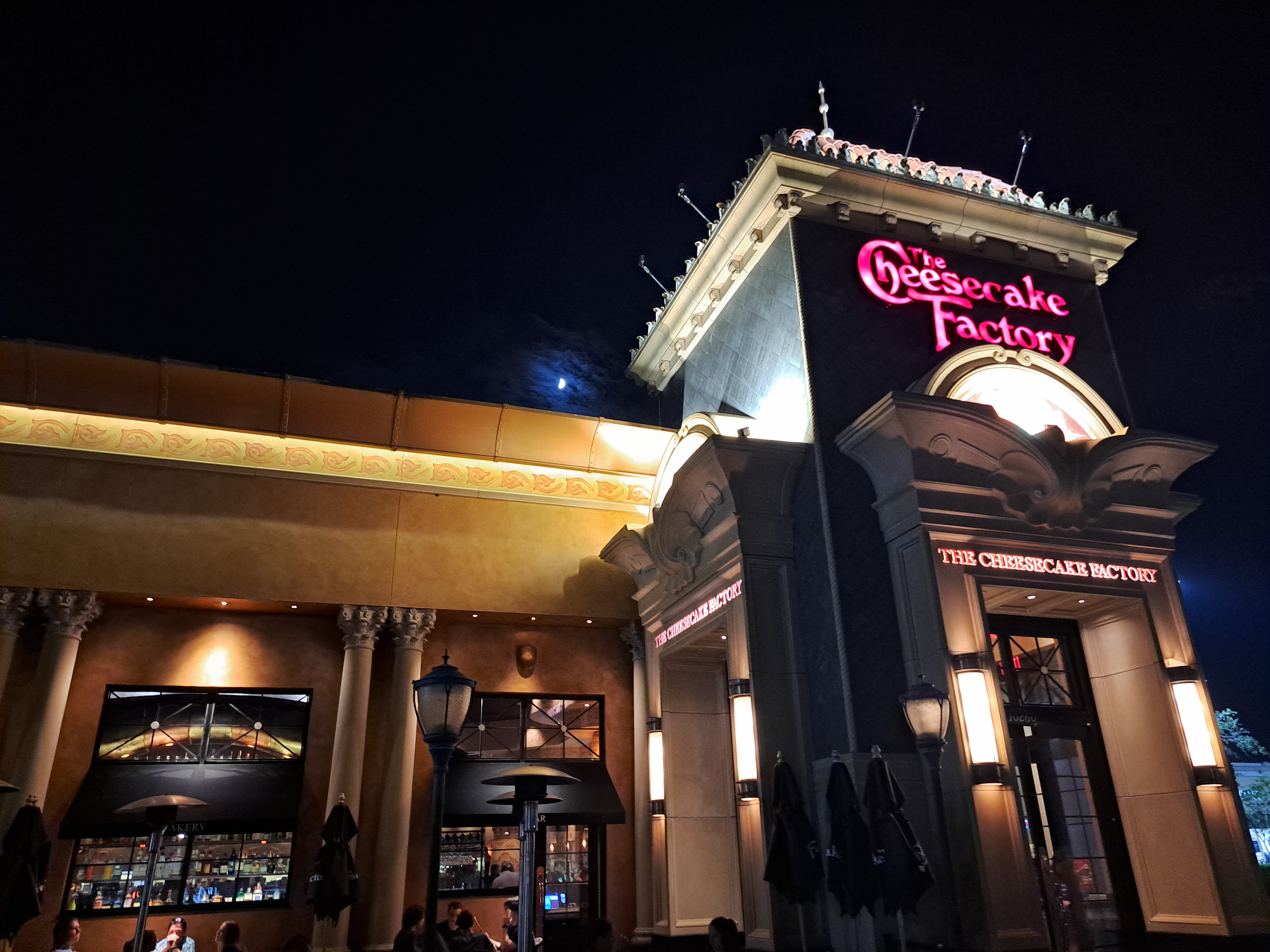
The Cheesecake Factory at night in the St. Johns Town Center

== Other ==
Condominiums were established in 2006 behind the St. Johns Town Center as part of further expansion. Additional apartments and hotels were also built since the center opened.

On November 23, 2013, Macklemore & Ryan Lewis performed at the St. Johns Town Center for the grand opening of the Microsoft Store (which would later close in 2020 as the company decided to close all Microsoft Stores).

Additional shops, retail complexes, and entertainment venues in the adjacent vicinity have been constructed since its opening (including a Sprouts Farmers Market, TopGolf facility, and an IKEA store about one mile away), with additional outlets under development as of 2019.

The development surrounding St. Johns Town Center has also contributed to the emergence of a broader Town Center area within Jacksonville’s Southside region that has developed into a major commercial, residential and entertainment hub. The area generally encompasses the Town Center Parkway corridor, much of Gate Parkway between Interstate 295 and Southside Boulevard, and portions of the St. Johns Bluff Road area adjacent to the University of North Florida campus. Its boundaries are informal and loosely defined, with some overlap with nearby areas such as Deerwood.
