= Southpoint (Jacksonville) =

Neighborhood of Jacksonville, Florida

- Neighborhood of Jacksonville
- Southpoint is coloured in brown
- ZIP Code: 32216, 32217, 32256
- Area code(s): 904, 324

Southpoint is a commercial section of Jacksonville, Florida on the city's Southside area, eight miles from Downtown. The area is composed primarily of commercial buildings, apartment complexes and professional office centers.

== Geography ==
Southpoint is located in the fast-growing southeast quadrant of Jacksonville, along J. Turner Butler Boulevard, an expressway which serves as a major thoroughfare to and from the Jacksonville Beaches.

Southpoint's boundaries are Bowden Road to the north, Belfort Road to the east, Butler Boulevard to the south and Interstate 95 to the west. Some businesses between I-95 and Philips Highway use Southpoint to reference their location, and there are many small hotels on that strip of land. Streets within Southpoint include Southpoint Parkway, Southpoint Drive North & South, Southpoint Boulevard, and Salisbury Road.

== History ==
Richard Green Skinner came to Jacksonville in 1899 in search of pine trees for harvesting sap to produce turpentine for his marine supply business. Land to the south and east of the St. Johns River was mostly pine trees, sand dunes or marsh; inhabited by wildlife. After 1900, the Skinner family owned close to 40,000 acres (160 km^{2}). That land was distributed to his six sons upon his death in the 1920s. The oldest brother, Bright, and two other brothers moved to Tampa and received the land owned there. The acreage nearest to the downtown went to Ben Skinner, who built the Skinner Dairy and Farm, which was closed and developed as Southpoint in the late 1970s.

When the initial segment of J. Turner Butler Boulevard (State Road 202) was completed in 1979, access to land around Butler Blvd improved, facilitating development of the area east of Interstate 95. Gate Petroleum partnered with the Bryant Skinner Company in 1980 to create the 250-acre (1.0 km^{2}) Southpoint office park and the area northeast of the intersection became Southpoint.

St. Lukes Hospital, built in 1984, is on the corner of Southpoint. It is now known as St. Vincent's Medical Center Southside. Many of the hospital's doctors have offices in Southpoint and employees live in nearby apartments.

== Residents ==
The population is 8,078, primarily young professionals and families who rent and are political moderates.

VA Clinic Southpoint "The Southpoint facility is 30,000 square feet, according to the VA. It provides primary care, mental health treatment, physical therapy, occupational therapy, traumatic brain injury treatment and prosthetics."

== See also ==
- Neighborhoods of Jacksonville
- Southside, Jacksonville
