= Sunbeam (Jacksonville) =

Neighborhood of Jacksonville, Florida

- Neighborhood of Jacksonville
- ZIP Code: 32257
- Area code(s): 904, 324

Sunbeam is a suburban residential neighborhood of Jacksonville, Florida on the city's Southside, 12½ miles from Downtown. In the 1970s and 1980s it was known for its landfill. The streets have homes that vary from million-dollar mansions to small wood-frame starters with a variety of architectural styles, including ranch-style homes and more contemporary designs. Landmarks include the San Jose Academy, Community Hospice & Palliative Care and Mandarin Middle School. Most new growth in Jacksonville is to the south and Sunbeam is at the center.

== Geography ==
The Sunbeam neighborhood is located 12½ miles south of Downtown. From Philips Highway at Sunbeam Road go west 2.4 miles to San Jose Boulevard, south to Old St. Augustine Road to Hood Road; east on Hood Road as it turns North back to Sunbeam Road.

== History ==
Development in the area did not really begin until the 1970s after Interstate 295 and the Buckman Bridge were completed. At that time, there was almost no development on Sunbeam Road itself because of the negative effects of the landfill, opened in 1972. The ends of Sunbeam Road at Philips Highway and San Jose Boulevard were exceptions, developed with their respective thoroughfares. As houses and churches sprung up in the 1980s, infrastructure kept up. Crown Point Fire Station was built in 1985. The following year, Mandarin Middle School and Mandarin Elementary School were completed. The Sunbeam Post Office opened in 1992. By the early 1990s, a few years after the dump was closed, apartment complexes opened on Sunbeam Road. The nearby Avenues Mall opened in 1990, providing shopping and entertainment within a few minutes' drive. There were still pastures and cattle in Sunbeam as late as 2018 when Price Park was platted and 2022 when Olde Mandarin Estates was platted.

== Landfill ==
The Sunbeam Sanitary Landfill was opened in 1972 by Waste Management. The 225 acres (91 ha) site is a mile west of U.S. Route 1 (Philips Highway), 12.5 miles (20.1 km) from downtown Jacksonville. Garbage trucks dumped nearly 4,000,000 cubic feet (110,000 m^{3}) of trash before capacity was reached in 1986, and it was closed. The mountain of trash rose 65 feet (20 m) over 71 acres (29 ha) and was "closed" by a 3 feet (0.91 m) soil cap.

=== Golf ===
For years the weeds grew unabated and it took more than 20 years for the methane to dissipate for safe use. In the summer of 2002, Waste Management sold the former Sunbeam Sanitary Landfill property to Brownfield Properties LLC of Atlanta who planned a golf course for the location. Retirement Corporation of America-Florida announced in early 2008 that 9-hole Sunbeam Hill Golf Course would open in November. Several golf holes were constructed, but the course was never played. Tropical Storm Fay caused significant erosion in late summer of 2008 and the owner was forced to declare bankruptcy after the 2008 financial crisis. The course did not open.

== Business ==
Ira Koger developed the suburban office park in 1957 as Midtown Centre. Koger Properties purchased 853 acres (345 ha) for development, south of Baymeadows Road and bounded by Philips Highway and I-95. The large size required the 1987 filing of a Development of Regional Impact (DRI) as defined in Section 380.06 of the Florida Statutes. Koger Baymeadows was developed from 1988 to 1998, accessed from Baymeadows Road with seven buildings he named Osborn, Gunti, Jackson, Hamilton, DeSoto, Nassau and Suwannee.

LNR Partners purchased the property from Koger prior to 2000 and renamed it Freedom Commerce Centre. Crocker Partners acquired the 54-acre office park in late 2012, rebranding it as Prominence. NeoVerde-St. Johns LLC, a Dallas partnership, bought 629 acres in Freedom Commerce in 2013 from the Goodman Company for $12.5 million. That land was placed in the Lower St. Johns Mitigation Bank through the St. Johns River Water Management District. The remaining property contains businesses on the East side of Philips Highway including the Regal 20 movie theater, businesses and restaurants; business park components such as common areas, roads and ponds; approximately 10 acres still undeveloped; and other conservation land.

In July 2024 Dream Finders Homes acquired the 68-acre, 754,691 square feet (70,113.1 m^{2}) office campus for $22 million. Dream Finders requested approval to demolish the office space prior to construction of 204 townhomes.

=== Recreation ===
In late 2020 following years of planning, the remaining 200 acres of the former landfill site along Sunbeam Road is projected to become Everlake, an active adult development and Aterro, a recreational park with multiple uses under consideration. Possibilities include a farmers' market, a dog park, walking/running paths, biking trails, pickleball and event areas. Infrastructure such as restrooms, fencing, parking, picnic tables etc., will be provided. Jacksonville's bikers and runners have contributed money and sweat equity while carving new trails into the hill.

The Southern Off-Road Bicycle Association Jacksonville (SORBA Jax) is a non-profit 501(c)(3) without paid staff. The bicycle park will utilize 100 acres (40 ha) as trails with 5 acres (2.0 ha) of frontage reserved for a pickleball court and dog park. As of 2023, approximately 3 miles of the trail had been constructed with total build out of 12 miles. Hill and Thorton are the property owners who are obligated to build a trail as mitigation for the 55+ community PUD adjacent. The bicycle park will allow SORBA Jax to lease the land for no money. There are other small parcels that could be used for other activities. The park trail system is estimated to cost $425,000, not including restrooms, fencing, parking, etc. Final cost will exceed $1 million. SORBA secured an official designation for the park as a member of the State Greenways and Trials System from the Florida Department of Environmental Protection. Owners and operators cannot make money from the development, but the State of Florida assumes liability if there is no usage charge and the trails are maintained.

The Jacksonville Track Club donated $85,000 and may provide funding for a 5K running trail, unpaved. Trek has committed to donating money for professional design and volunteer construction. Safety will be assisted by over 100 signs to keep cyclists and pedestrians separate. The future includes youth programs and providing bicycles on site.

== Neighborhood ==
Some subdivisions are older, constructed from 1970 to 1999, but over 70% of apartments and developments are newer, built after 2000. The neighborhood is occupied by both renters and owners. Dwellings are mostly large (4-5+) or medium (3–4) bedroom single-family residences and townhomes. Sunbeam is an excellent family-friendly area with good schools, low crime and homes occupied by their owners. The area has a high percentage of parents with college degrees and over 70% of the residents are married. The average income in Sunbeam is higher than nearly 90% of neighborhoods in the U.S.; only 7% of children are under the federal poverty line. Over 54% of Sunbeam's workers are in executive, professional or management jobs; more than 16% work in sales & service; almost 15% in manufacturing & labor; and nearly 14% in tech support or clerical. Over half of Sunbeam's working residents commute from 15 to 30 minutes one-way; two-thirds drive by themselves in a personal vehicle. Public transportation is only available on the north boundary of Sunbeam Road and west boundary of Old St. Augustine Road where apartments are prolific. There are no parks within the Sunbeam neighborhood of Jacksonville. Richard H. 'Dick' Kravitz Regional Park, formerly Losco Regional Park, is situated two miles south of the Sunbeam neighborhood and was established in 1998. In addition to Mandarin Middle and Elementary schools, there are several Charter and Church-based schools in the neighborhood. There are also three retirement and/or assisted-living facilities in the Sunbeam neighborhood.

== See also ==
- Neighborhoods of Jacksonville
- Southside, Jacksonville
