= St. Vincent's Medical Center Southside =

- St. Vincent's Health Services
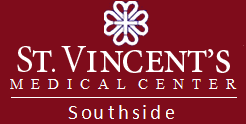

Geography
- Location: Jacksonville, Florida, United States
- Coordinates: 30.2537978°N 81.5840456°W

Organization
- Care system: Medicare/Medicaid/Public
- Type: General medical and surgical

Services
- Emergency department: yes
- Beds: 175

History
- Founded: 1873

Links
- Website: jaxhealth.com
- Lists: Hospitals in Florida

St. Vincent's Medical Center Southside is a not-for-profit, faith-based hospital located in the southern part of Jacksonville, Florida. It is a member of St. Vincent's HealthCare and is affiliated with Ascension Health. Founded as St. Luke's Hospital in 1873, it was Jacksonville's first private hospital and is Florida's oldest private hospital.

== History ==
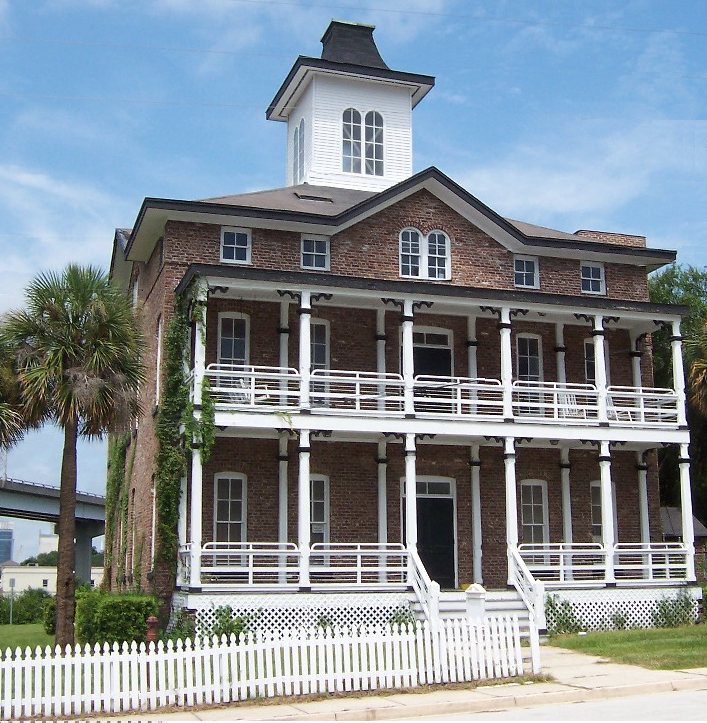
Old St. Lukes Hospital, 1878

Three local Jacksonville women began St. Lukes in 1873 to serve people in the area during the winter tourist season. Susan Hartridge, Myra H. Mitchell, and Anna Doggett rented the first structure, a farmhouse with two rooms. A new building was erected three years later, but was never occupied due to arson.

The subsequent 1878 building was also located in the downtown core, but survived the Great Fire of 1901, which consumed nearly every structure in the city. That building was outgrown and a new facility was acquired in the Springfield area, where the hospital was located from 1914 to 1984.

The 1878 Old St. Luke's Hospital was purchased by the Jacksonville Historical Society to become a museum housing the society's one million plus documents and photographs.

== Recent ==
The current facility was opened in December 1984, contained 289 beds, and offered general acute care services and specialized medical/surgical procedures. It is located in the fast-growing southeast quadrant of Jacksonville, along J. Turner Butler Boulevard, an expressway which serves as a major thoroughfare to and from the Jacksonville Beaches.

Mayo Clinic opened an outpatient facility in Jacksonville in 1985, then bought St. Luke's in 1987 to serve as a tertiary referral hospital primarily to attract difficult and complex cases, which was Mayo's specialty. St. Luke's became an affiliate of Mayo Clinic and the admitting hospital for Mayo Clinic Jacksonville patients. Mayo also wanted to prove that there was sufficient demand to justify expending a huge investment for a new facility. Purchasing an existing hospital was more economical in case the north Florida location didn't work out. There were actually two separate staffs, one working for Mayo, and the other for local doctors and patients with "normal" medical needs. Both Mayo's main Jacksonville campus as well as St. Luke's are located off of the J. T. Butler Expressway, approximately 10 miles apart.

In May 2001, the Mayo Clinic revealed that they intended to construct a new teaching hospital on the grounds of its main campus and sell St. Luke's to St. Vincent's HealthCare. Just prior to Mayo's announcement, Baptist Health stated their intention of building a new hospital, Baptist Medical Center South, near the southern Duval county line.

Jacksonville's Memorial Hospital (owned by HCA), fearing a decline in their business, objected to the construction of Mayo's new facilities. They filed an appeal with the state's Agency for Health Care Administration, which halted action until the appeal was dismissed in March, 2005. On July 1, 2005 Mayo executed a Leaseback with St. Vincent's Health System for $150 million. Mayo continued to operate St. Luke's for three years during construction of the new Mayo Clinic Hospital, and transferred 214 patient beds to the new facility when it was completed.

On April 18, 2008, ambulances ferried 67 patients from St. Luke's to the new facility at Mayo Clinic Hospital, and St. Vincent's Health System assumed control of St. Luke's Hospital.

Unfortunately for St. Luke's, the new Mayo hospital and the new facility Baptist South, diverted patients who previously would have gone to St. Luke's. The administrators anticipated a drop, and closed the fourth and fifth floors, reducing the number of beds available from 313 to 145. The latest available yearly statistics show that the emergency room had 23,549 patients, they admitted 7,279 persons with 1,264 outpatient and 1,492 inpatient surgeries performed.

In early 2012, St. Vincent's HealthCare announced name changes for the facilities in their group. St. Vincent's Hospital became St. Vincent's Medical Center Riverside; St. Luke's Hospital was renamed St. Vincent's Medical Center Southside; and a new hospital under construction will be named, St. Vincent's Medical Center Clay County.

As of 2020, the hospital is undergoing a $26 million renovation.

The St. Vincent's Medical Center Southside hospital was opened in 1984 as St. Lukes
