= Jacksonville Civic Council =

American-based think tank

- Predecessor: Jacksonville Non-Group
- Formation: 2009
- Type: 501(c)(6) Non-profit
- Tax ID no.: 59-3485919
- Legal status: active
- Purpose: To make Jacksonville a destination of choice for businesses, families and individuals, and graduates
- Headquarters: 40 East Adams Street, Suite 150 Jacksonville, Florida 32202, U.S.
- Region served: Duval County, Florida
- Members: 95
- Board Chair: Gary Chartrand
- CEO and President: Dennis Whittle
- Revenue: $985,803 (2024)
- Expenses: $982,440 (2024)
- Endowment: $467,469 (2024)
- Employees: 7
- Volunteers: 5
- Website: jaxciviccouncil.com

The Jacksonville Civic Council (JCC) is a non-partisan group of nearly one hundred prominent Jacksonville, Florida business leaders who want to make Jacksonville a destination of choice for businesses, families and individuals, and graduates. The vision is for the "city to be a safe, personally satisfying, economically rewarding place to live and raise a family." The "mission is to build Jacksonville's reputation as a successful, medium-sized city that takes pride in itself, is known for integrity and predictable growth, and affords all its citizens equal opportunity and respect." The JCC is a 501(c)(6) entity, which is a non-profit, tax exempt group funded by dues based on the size of the member's business.

== Current chair and staff ==
Gary Chartrand, Board Chair; Dennis Whittle, CEO & President; David Garfunkel, Chief Program Officer; Alex Osborne, Senior Director of Operations & Membership; Shelby Howick, Director of Strategy; Connor Oswald, Director of Strategy, Devynne Duke, Project Manager; Rachael Delgado, Operations Associate, Ashli Nixon, Brand Consultant

== Membership ==
The membership consists of 95 CEOs, presidents, and their local equivalents from leading organizations in Jacksonville, all of whom demonstrate a strong record of civic contribution. The membership includes business leaders, representatives from hospitals, universities, and non-profit organizations. It provides access to exclusive events that facilitate valuable and thoughtful input from organizational leaders, aimed at contributing to Jacksonville's growth and development as a world-class city. The organization conducts interdisciplinary and unbiased research on a wide range of public policy issues, advocating for economic growth and an improved quality of life in Jacksonville. JCC is known for taking bold and sometimes unpopular positions on public policy, doing so in a non-partisan manner.

== Jacksonville Civic Council values ==
- Collaboration: Work with other leaders in the community to improve our city
- Leadership: Address issues and critical needs that other entities will not or cannot resolve
- Focus: Create an effective civic-leadership model that focuses on critical priorities, minimizes inefficiencies, improves quality of life and economic competitiveness
- Broad Constituency: Seek solutions to benefit businesses and residents at all levels
- Advocacy: Use advocacy and education to achieve lasting policy change for stakeholders at local, state, and national levels
- Economic Development: Support economic opportunity regardless of race, gender, ethnicity or other barriers that limit our city's potential
- Transparency & Accountability: Reach measurable outcomes by using knowledge and research to make decisions

== History ==
1993: The Non-Group Formation The Jacksonville Civic Council traces its origins to 1993, when an informal organization known as "The Non-Group" was created. This group of business leaders initially focused on supporting the Duval County Public Schools' Alliance for World Class Education, which later evolved into the Jacksonville Public Education Fund. The Non-Group functioned as a think tank or brain trust, leveraging its influence and resources to address community challenges.

2000: Incorporation of the Jacksonville Civic Council On May 17, 2000, the Jacksonville Civic Council (JCC) was formally incorporated. Key figures in the incorporation included Hugh Greene, John Delaney, Lynn Pappas, Pete Rummell, and Steven Halverson. However, the organization remained inactive until December 2009.

2009-2010: Transition to the Jacksonville Civic Council In October 2009, members of the Jacksonville Chamber of Commerce visited Kansas City, Missouri, to explore the successful public-private partnerships that had revitalized that city. Inspired by Kansas City's Civic Council, Lynn Pappas, then chairwoman of the Non-Group, realized that a similar initiative could be implemented in Jacksonville. Upon returning, Pappas shared the ideas with fellow members. At their December meeting, the Non-Group voted to dissolve and reorganize as the more formal and public Jacksonville Civic Council. The group identified five critical issues to address: fiscal responsibility, job creation, public education, public safety, and the retention of the Jacksonville Jaguars.

2021: Strategic Planning and Leadership Transition In 2021, the Jacksonville Civic Council undertook a strategic planning process to guide the city's development over the next decade. The Council aimed to make Jacksonville a world-class city by becoming more proactive in shaping the community's future. As part of this transition, the Civic Council hired a new CEO and President, Dennis Whittle, following a national search. Whittle, co-founder of GlobalGiving and Feedback Labs, and former Senior Partner of Strategy and Innovation at the World Bank, was chosen for his track record in leading initiatives.

2025: Current Status as of 2025, the Jacksonville Civic Council continues to grow and evolve. The membership has expanded to 94 members, and the organization is in the second year of its ambitious ten-year strategic plan.

== Actions taken ==
The Jacksonville Civic Council has consistently taken a non-partisan approach to advocating for initiatives that improve the city's well-being and competitiveness. Key actions include:

- Formation of the Downtown Investment Authority: Participated in the establishment of the Downtown Investment Authority to help drive the revitalization of Jacksonville's downtown area.
- Opposition to JEA Privatization: Opposed the privatization of Jacksonville Electric Authority (JEA), citing concerns over the long-term implications for the city and its residents.
- Annual Public Finance Study: Produced an annual study of public finance to ensure transparency and accountability in the city's financial operations.
- COVID-19 Vaccination Campaign: Developed and led a public health campaign focused on encouraging COVID-19 vaccination within the Jacksonville community.
- Research and Advocacy for Pension Reform: Conducted research and advocated for reforms to the City of Jacksonville's pension system to ensure long-term fiscal stability.
- Influence on Removal of Confederate Monuments: Played a key role in advocating for the removal of Confederate monuments in Jacksonville, contributing to broader discussions on racial justice and public memory.
- Education Reform Initiatives: Led initiatives aimed at reforming the education system in Jacksonville to improve public schools and better serve students.
- Support for DCPS Facilities Tax: Advocated for a tax to fund the renovation and repair of public school facilities within Duval County Public Schools (DCPS).
- Business Sector DEI Survey: Conducted a survey of local businesses on diversity, equity, and inclusion (DEI) to help guide efforts toward more inclusive business practices.
- Support for Local Option Gas Tax: Supported the implementation of a local option gas tax to fund transportation infrastructure projects in Jacksonville.
- Recommendation for Human Rights Ordinance: Recommended the creation of a human rights ordinance to ensure protections against discrimination for all residents.

== Strategic initiatives ==
During its strategic planning process, the Jacksonville Civic Council (JCC) identified four key pillars to guide its efforts: Inspire, Advance, Prepare, and Connect. Each pillar focuses on specific areas of development and desired outcomes for the city of Jacksonville. JCC members also brainstormed collaboratively to identify the initiatives necessary to make Jacksonville the destination of choice for businesses, families, and graduates.

Inspire: The goal is to inspire individuals to take action by presenting a compelling vision of a greater Jacksonville.
Focus Areas:

- Improve internal communication among JCC members
- Expand the reach of JCC's mission and vision
- Unite the diverse culture of Jacksonville's 1 million residents

Advance: This pillar focuses on increasing economic mobility, access, and resilience for all residents, creating a more prosperous and equitable city.
Focus Areas:

- Improve wealth and prosperity.
- Improve health and safety.
- Increase literacy.

Prepare: This pillar focuses on education and workforce readiness to ensure Jacksonville's future competitiveness.
Focus Areas:

- Improve reading and math proficiency.
- Increase the quality of early learning education.
- Foster post-secondary education opportunities.

Connect: This pillar focuses on building places and connectivity that foster a greater quality of life.
Focus Areas:

- Stadium and neighborhood redevelopment
- Downtown universities
- Connected & Walkable Communities
- Urban parks

Jacksonville residents will enjoy improved health, stronger social connections, and greater civic engagement. Each of these pillars plays a vital role in shaping the future of Jacksonville, advancing civic engagement, education, economic mobility, and quality of life, while positioning the city as a leader in innovation, connectivity, and resilience. Through collaborative brainstorming and strategic initiatives, JCC members are working together to make Jacksonville the destination of choice for businesses, families, and graduates.

== EpicJax process ==
The EpicJax sprint process is a time-limited, iterative approach to driving cross-sector collaboration that leads to meaningful community change. Sprint teams work quickly to test new ideas, learn from shared experiences, and adapt strategies as necessary. This process encourages communities to unite and work together to make Jacksonville a world-class city, with opportunity for all. Each 90-day sprint focuses on a specific outcome, with monthly milestones dedicated to testing or refining ideas to achieve that goal. Before each sprint, a 90-day "warm-up" period allows the community to engage in inquiry and gather insights, ensuring that each sprint is based on informed, well-thought-out possibilities. At the end of each 90-day sprint, the community will have made measurable progress toward its ambitious, yet achievable, outcomes.

Active EpicJax Sprints & Warm-Ups:

- Digital Literacy
- Public Safety
- Downtown Strikeforce
- Quality Early Learning
- Building Black Wealth
- Diving Deeper Into Jacksonville's Identity
- Neighborhoods & Place

The EpicJax process is central to the Jacksonville Civic Council's efforts to accelerate change, foster collaboration, and build a stronger, more inclusive community for all of Jacksonville's residents.

== Jax 365 ==
This community-wide movement, supported by the JCC, encourages every Jaxson to "Share Your World-Class Idea" on the JAX365 website that will help shape the city's future.

== Jacksonville Civic Council Foundation ==
During the strategic initiative identification process, the Jacksonville Civic Council (JCC) recognized the need for additional revenue to achieve the desired outcomes. To address this need, JCC staff and the Board established the Jacksonville Civic Council Foundation.

Inspire & Fuel an EPIC Future for Jacksonville The Jacksonville Civic Council Foundation is dedicated to advancing the city of Jacksonville by fostering world-class research and providing civic engagement training. The foundation's mission is to move the city forward by addressing key challenges and opportunities, ensuring that Jacksonville becomes a thriving city for all of its residents.

The Foundation has three primary modes of impact: Research, Execution and Advocacy

Areas of Focus The Foundation's work is centered around a range of topics that are crucial to achieving the goal of making Jacksonville a prosperous and inclusive city.

The current leadership of the Jacksonville Civic Council Foundation includes:

- Board Chair: David Miller
- Vice Chair: Amy Berg
- Secretary: Dennis Whittle

Through its efforts in research and civic engagement, the Jacksonville Civic Council Foundation works towards a future where Jacksonville is a city that provides opportunity for all.
