= Herb Peyton =

American entrepreneur

- Peyton at Gate River Run in 2008
- Born: January 6, 1932 (age 94); Bowling Green, Kentucky, U.S.
- Education: University of Florida
- Occupation: Founder of Gate Petroleum
- Political party: Republican
- Spouse(s): Marilyn Stephens (divorced); Virginia Gaines (divorced); Marcy Murphy
- Children: John Stephens (Marilyn); Henry Hill, Jennifer Gaines (Virginia); Forest, Sarah (Marcy)

Herbert Hill Peyton (born January 6, 1932) is an American entrepreneur and founder of Gate Petroleum in Jacksonville, Florida, which had sales of $1.44 billion in 2008. He is the father of John Peyton, current President of Gate and former two-term Mayor of Jacksonville.

== Company origins ==
Peyton bought his first gas station in 1960 and slowly expanded throughout the decade, diversifying when gas became scarce during the Arab Oil embargo of the early 1970s.

In 1997, he acknowledged owning 80 percent of Gate Petroleum, with the remaining 20 percent belonging to "the Brothers"; long-term employees (men and women) who were instrumental in the company's growth, which had 2006 revenues of over U.S. $1.28 billion.

In 2001, The Florida Times-Union reported that Peyton, "pushing 70, is a larger than life figure who competes in triathlons and does at least one six-mile run every week, as well as a one-mile swim far out beyond the surf line". He has five children from three marriages; the oldest, John Peyton, is currently President of Gate and previously served two terms as Mayor of Jacksonville from 2003 to 2011. Herb Peyton attended the University of Florida, and was a member of the class of 1956.

== Civic involvement ==
Herb Peyton was a trustee of the Alfred I. duPont Testamentary Trust from January 18, 1995, to January 31, 2017 and was named a Trustee Emeritus. He also served on the Nemours Foundation Board of Directors and is a trustee emeritus. Peyton was elected as a director of Florida East Coast Industries and St. Joe Company in December 2000 and provided the benefit of his experience through 2004, when he retired from both boards. Peyton was named an honorary director of Dreams Come True in recognition of his contribution of land and construction material for the non-profit's new headquarters in 2002.

In 2004, the National Association of Office and Industrial Properties chapter in Northeast Florida presented the William Drennon Lifetime Achievement Award to Peyton.

Peyton made a $1 million gift to the Bolles School in 2006, the largest capital donation in school history. The money was used to construct a facility for the school's Crew team, named the Peyton Boathouse. The Bolles boys and girls Crew teams have each won five state championships.

Since its founding in 1993, he was a member of the Jacksonville Non-Group, which evolved into the Jacksonville Civic Council.

== Retirement ==
In a January 9, 2009, interview in the Jacksonville Daily Record, Mayor John Peyton was asked about his plans for 2011 when his term ends. He responded:

"I’m going back to Gate and rejoin the family business. I’m looking forward to that. I told dad (Herb Peyton) that he has saved a lot of money because he hasn’t had to pay me for eight years. I think my father is very eager to retire. He wasn’t excited about me running for a second term. If it had been his choice, I would have gone back [to Gate] sooner."

On January 3, 2012, three days before his 80th birthday, Herb Peyton retired as Gate's President but remained Chairman, taking a less active company role. He named son John as company president and son Hill as vice president of marketing. When asked about his future involvement, Peyton indicated that he would not be involved with the daily operations, but would "help when needed and offer advice when asked--and on occasion, when not asked." He also intends to continue his training and fitness regimen, which includes swimming and running nearly every day.
