= Timuquana Country Club =

Country club in Jacksonville, Florida

Coordinates: 30°14′49″N 81°41′03″W

- Interactive map of Timuquana Country Club

Club information
- Location: 4028 Timuquana Road; Jacksonville, Florida
- Established: 1923
- Type: Private, member-owned
- Operator: Timuquana Board of Governors
- Tournaments: 2002 USGA Senior Amateur Championship; 2019 U.S. Women's Amateur Four-Ball; 2021–2025 PGA Tour Champions Constellation Furyk & Friends
- Website: timuquana.net

Timuquana Golf Course
- Designed by: Donald Ross (1923); Robert Trent Jones (1948); George Cobb (1957,1963); David W. Gordon (1968); Bobby Weed (1996)
- Par: 72
- Length: 6,859
- Course rating: 73.0
- Slope rating: 130
- Course record: 62 (May 6, 2005)

Timuquana Country Club is a private golf and country club in Jacksonville, Florida. Located in Jacksonville's Ortega neighborhood, it was founded in 1923. Its golf course was originally designed by Donald Ross, and members have included PGA Tour professionals Steve Melnyk, David Duval and current member Jim Furyk. It has hosted various golf tournaments since its opening, including the 2002 United States Senior Men's Amateur Golf Championship, the U.S. Women's Amateur Four-Ball in 2019, and is the host site for the PGA Tour Champions Constellation Furyk & Friends starting in 2021.

== History ==
Named after the Timucua people, the Timuquana Country Club was founded in 1921 and its charter approved in 1923. The first president was John L. Roe and the course designed by Donald Ross.

The course hosted the Southern Amateur championship several times, and the 1928 Florida State Amateur Tournament was won by club president Al Ulmer at Timuquana.

Bobby Jones was stationed at Naval Air Station Jacksonville during World War II and often played golf at neighboring Timuquana. Robert Trent Jones, another well-known golf course designer, worked with club members in 1948 to develop a ten-year blueprint for improving the course. Many of the suggestions were implemented during the 1950s, including adding a lake on the 5th, which the tee shot must traverse. This became the course's signature hole.

Sectional qualifying rounds were held at Timuquana for several USGA Senior Amateur Championships, and the U.S. Amateurs in 1955, 1966, 1970, 1973 and 1976. George Cobb tweaked the course design in 1957 and 1963, as did David W. Gordon in 1968, who added a lake to the 6th hole. In the seventy years since Donald Ross built the course, the changes introduced by other architects to "freshen" the course had erased the characteristics that made the original design playable and enjoyable. Bobby Weed was tasked in 1995 with restoring the Ross design, but there were no blueprints or design notes. His only reference was a 1943 aerial photograph from the nearby Navy base. On three holes, Workers found groups of bushes planted as 150-yard markers in 1923 that were now 20 yards in the rough. Between April and October 1996, Weed cleared brush and cut down 800 trees that had encroached on the fairways, restoring the angles that Ross intended.

At the end of the 1990s, new federal rules required more efficient use of water for irrigating non-agricultural land. The southern property line of Timuquana Country Club abuts the Naval Air Station Jacksonville, and they partnered with the Navy to use the base's treated wastewater effluent for golf course irrigation, which began in the fall of 1997.

=== 1952 aircraft accident ===
At approximately 10.00 am on 19 March, a pilot on a routine training flight from the adjacent US Navy base had engine trouble due to low oil pressure. He attempted to land back at the base, but instead tried to make an emergency landing on the 7th hole. The plane landed on the fairway, instantly killing Bertha Johnson and Mary Dempsey, who had just played their tee shots and were walking to their balls. The plane continued down the fairway, crashing into a clump of trees before exploding into flames. The pilot scrambled out of the wreckage, before being informed of the tragedy that had occurred.

== Other amenities ==
=== Golf Course & Practice Areas ===
In the summer of 2021, the club began work on a full renovation of its Driving Range and practice areas..

=== Tennis ===
Two clay tennis courts were created in 1933 but were little used and eventually removed. In 1963, the Club built four tennis courts and later added four clay courts. A large number of members participate in the club's tennis league, which is active year-round.

Although a swimming pool had been proposed from the earliest days of the club, it was not until after World War II that one was built for and enjoyment of the members and their families. In 1963, the Club added a new swimming pool with family and lap areas. In 2000, the poolside grille was given a facelift and new restroom facilities were added. In 2019, the pool was renovated.

=== Boating & Dock Facilities ===
Many members enjoy boating on the St. Johns River, or visiting the club by boat. Alfred I. duPont provided the club's first dock as a gift in 1929. That structure was replaced in 1949, and in early 2002, a new floating dock system was installed for transient docking.

=== Fitness Center ===
Plans for a 3,000-square-foot (280 m^{2}) Fitness Center were approved in March 2000, with construction beginning during the summer of 2000 and a grand opening was held July 7, 2001. In 2018, following flood damages from a hurricane, the Fitness Center was completely renovated from floor to ceiling.

=== Clubhouse ===
A clubhouse was built in 1923, but by the 1950s, it became apparent that the club had outgrown the structure. The issue was studied by nearly every club board and committee, and the Permanent Improvement Committee created a plan that involved rebuilding some sections, remodeling others and constructing new additions. It was approved by the membership and construction began in June 1958. The resulting Southern-style clubhouse, which opened December 16, 1958, was designed to resemble Tara from the movie Gone with the Wind. The clubhouse includes a fine dining facility (the Skyline Room), meeting and banquet rooms and casual eating options. Social events, traditions and activities are scheduled year-round. A new men's lounge, known as the "19th Hole" and maintenance/storage buildings were constructed in 1963. The club's 75th anniversary was observed in 1998.

In March 2000 members approved an 21,000-square-foot (2,000 m^{2}) expansion to the clubhouse, costing $2.4 million. KBJ Architects designed and managed the projects, which included:

- the men's grille and cocktail lounge was renovated
- expanded "Pow Wow Room" for casual dining
- a new elevator and handicapped accessible toilet facilities were added to improve facilities for the disabled
- a Heritage Gallery was created to showcase trophies and the club's history

Construction began during the summer of 2000, and a grand opening was held July 7, 2001.

In September 2002, Timuquana hosted the United States Senior Men's Amateur Golf Championship.

In April 2019, Timuquana hosted the U.S. Women's Amateur Four-Ball.

Since October 2021, Timuquana has hosted the annual Constellation Furyk and Friends, a PGA Tour Champions tournament hosted by Jim Furyk.
