= J. J. Daniel =

American businessman

J.J. Daniel
- J.J. Daniel in 1973
- Born: September 22, 1916; Jacksonville, Florida
- Died: August 7, 1990 (aged 74); Jacksonville, Florida
- Education: University of Florida; Princeton University
- Known for: Being designated a Great Floridian

Jaquelin James Daniel (September 22, 1916 – August 7, 1990) was an American lawyer, businessman, civic leader, and newspaper publisher. He was born and lived most of his life in Jacksonville, Florida, where he led the effort that resulted in the Jacksonville Consolidation of 1968, which combined city and county governments to improve services. He was known in his lifetime as one of the city's and state's most politically powerful people.

== Early life, family and education ==
Jaquelin James Daniel, known as J. J., was born in 1916 into a powerful Jacksonville, Florida family. His great-grandfather was a young lumberman turned attorney who migrated to Florida in 1846. His grandfather, for whom he was named, was a colonel in the Civil War and became one of the most influential citizens of postwar Jacksonville. He was also a principal in the prestigious Jacksonville law firm Fleming and Daniel. The colonel reorganized the Chamber of Commerce and served as President of the Citizens' Auxiliary Association before dying in 1888 in Jacksonville's yellow fever epidemic. Daniel's father was a prominent lawyer and leader in the Urban League.

Daniel attended local segregated schools and earned his undergraduate degree at Princeton University, where he also played football. He received his law degree in 1942 from the University of Florida. He served as an officer in the U.S. Navy in World War II and took part in the Invasion of Normandy. After the war, he joined his father's Jacksonville law firm.

== Career ==
In 1960, Daniel became the president of Stockton, Whatley, Davin & Co., one of the largest mortgage banking and real estate firms in the Southeast.

In addition, from 1976 until 1982, Daniel was publisher of both the Florida Times-Union and Jacksonville Journal. (His paternal grandfather, in 1888, became the first president of Florida Publishing Company, original owner of the Florida Times-Union. The company bought the Jacksonville Journal in 1959.)

== Consolidation ==
In 1966 the Florida legislature created the Local Government Study Commission to develop a plan to merge Jacksonville city and Duval County services and government, at the request of city leaders. They were dismayed by widespread corruption and waste in local government during the 1960s, when numerous city elected and appointed officials were indicted, as were some county officials.

Daniel was named to lead this effort. He was known for his integrity, strong leadership, and history of civic involvement. He and the commission developed a proposal for consolidation that was put before the voters of Jacksonville, other jurisdictions, and unincorporated areas of Duval County. It was strongly approved and implemented in 1968. A few small jurisdictions maintained their independence from the consolidation, with some later procuring services from the new government.

At the time, it became the only consolidated government in the state of Florida and one of the few at the time in the nation. In reviewing John Fischer's Vital Signs, Time noted that according to Fischer, "[t]he hero of the consolidation of Jacksonville, Fla., where the voters in five municipalities chose to form one central government, is an enthusiastic oligarch named J.J. Daniel, who got his way simply because 'he knew almost everybody of consequence in the community.'"

== Influence and later years ==
In 1977, the St. Petersburg Times described Daniel as "a pillar of the North Florida business and political establishment...probably Jacksonville's most respected citizen" and named him as one of the ten most powerful people in the state.

J. J. Daniel served on the Florida Board of Control from 1957 to 1961 and the Florida Board of Regents from 1971 to 1982. He was chairman of both boards and was instrumental in getting the University of North Florida established in Jacksonville in 1965. The administration building at the school was named J. J. Daniel Hall and dedicated to his memory in February 1991, following his death.

He was influential in establishing the Episcopal High School of Jacksonville in 1966. He also served on many non-profit boards, including the American Red Cross, the District Welfare Board, and the Jacksonville Chamber of Commerce.

Jaquelin James Daniel died in 1990.

== Legacy and honors ==
- He was named a Great Floridian by the Florida Department of State, an honor extended to individuals who made major contributions to the progress and welfare of the state of Florida. His Great Floridian plaque can be viewed at the Florida Times-Union Building in Jacksonville.
