= Stockton, Whatley, Davin & Co. =

American financial services company

- The new headquarters at 100 W. Bay St. which opened in November 1963.
- Trade name: SWD
- Type: Private
- Industry: Insurance; Real estate Mortgage banking
- Predecessor: Telfair Stockton Company, 1884
- Founder: James R. Stockton Sr.
- Defunct: 1983
- Headquarters: Jacksonville, Florida, U.S.
- Area served: Florida, Georgia & Alabama
- Key people: Brown L. Whatley; Joseph W. Davin; Jim Stockton (partners)
- Parent: General American Oil Company (1964)

Stockton, Whatley, Davin & Co. (SWD) was one of the largest mortgage banking, real estate and insurance firms in the Southeast of the United States. It was founded in 1884 as the property management Telfair Stockton Company and operated until 1983 when it was broken up by its new owner Phillips Petroleum Company. The assets were sold to First National Bank of Boston and Gate Petroleum.

Prior to its breakup the company was headquartered in Jacksonville, Florida and was the developer of Ponte Vedra Beach in the early 1930s. At its height, SWD had a real estate portfolio worth $100 million and a mortgage loan servicing portfolio of $3.8 billion, providing services in Florida, Georgia and Alabama.

== History ==
The original company was founded by Telfair Stockton, Sr. in 1884. Following his Marine Corps service in World War I, his son, James R. Stockton Sr. joined the firm to learn the business. When Telfair died in 1932, James Stockton ran the company until merging with the Whatley Davin Development Company. The three principals were James Stockton Sr., Brown L. Whatley and Joseph W. Davin.

The San Marco district of Jacksonville was developed by SWD in the 1920s, as was Ponte Vedra Beach in the early 1930s.

The abandoned San Jose Hotel was purchased from the Alfred I. duPont Testamentary Trust in 1946. The hotel became the San Jose campus of The Bolles School, but hotel's golf course and clubhouse opened in 1947 as the San Jose Country Club after $300,000 was spent on renovation. The kitchen was expanded and a new pro shop was built. Steam and sauna rooms were added to the men's lockers; a women's locker room was constructed. The San Jose Country Club is on the National Register of Historic Places.

Brown Whatley wrote to Florida mortgage bankers in late June 1952 urging them to meet in Jacksonville to discuss common problems and possible solutions. Later that summer, the Mortgage Bankers Association of Florida was formed with membership from more than 60 companies.

In 1960, J.J. Daniel was president of SWD. He pushed development of the Deerwood section of Jacksonville, and the companion Deerwood Country Club, the most exclusive gated community at the time and for many years thereafter. The company was servicing over 50,000 mortgages valued at $420 million, making it the 4th-largest mortgage company in the United States.

SWD and Arvida Corp. were two of the largest real estate companies in Florida in the 1960s. Management of approximately $100 in land from Miami-based Arvida was entrusted to SWD in 1961 when the two created an alliance.

The main offices of SWD in downtown Jacksonville were demolished in late 1962 and replaced with a seven-story office building designed by architects Saxelbye & Powell. The 79,052 sq ft (7,344.2 m^{2}) building opened in November, 1963 in addition to ten other offices in Florida. The company's executives occupied one floor, the staff utilized five floors, and the seventh floor was reserved for the employee lounge.

The General American Oil Company purchased SWD in 1964.

Don Davis was named general manager of Deerwood Country Club in 1965, a position he held for over 20 years. In 1978, Davis was promoted to operations vice president of SWD, responsible for all Deerwood Club operations, including the sale of residences and home sites. William F. Aberly joined SWD as financial vice president in 1965 and retired as chairman and CEO in 1984, prior to the company's dissolution.

Like his father, James Stockton, Jr. began working with his own father at SWD. While on safari to Africa in 1970, he envisioned another golf course resort development like Ponte Vedra in the wild landscape along the coast. After he returned to Florida, he arranged to purchase 1,600 feet of ocean frontage near property SWD had available since the 1960s. He engaged a golf course architect and an engineering firm to draw plans for a new development named Sawgrass that eventually encompassed 1,200 acres.

Phillips Petroleum Company acquired SWD early in 1983 in the $1.1 billion purchase of the General American Oil Company of Texas, which announced a plan to sell SWD. A number of banks and corporations made combined offers for the 50,000+ acres of real estate and $100+ million in mortgage notes. When the bids were analyzed, Phillips saw that they would maximize their return by selling SWD's real estate and mortgages separately.

Executives of First National Bank of Boston were not interested in the real estate; their offer of $120 million for the mortgage banking business was accepted. Gate Petroleum bid $60 million for the real estate portfolio, which was less than the value of the assets, but they were the only entity that submitted an offer on just the real estate, so the properties were sold to Gate.
