= Florida State Road 202 =

Highway in Florida

State Road 202
- J. Turner Butler Boulevard
- Florida State Road 202 highlighted in red

Route information
- Maintained by FDOT
- Length: 13.042 mi (20.989 km)
- Existed: 1979–present

Major junctions
- West end: US 1 in Jacksonville
- I-95 in Jacksonville; SR 115 in Jacksonville; I-295 in Jacksonville
- East end: SR A1A in Jacksonville Beach

Location
- Country: United States
- State: Florida

Highway system
- Florida State Highway System; Interstate; US; State; Former; Pre‑1945; Toll; Scenic
← SR 200	→ SR 206

State Road 202 (SR 202) is a 13.042-mile-long (20.989 km) state highway that extends from U.S. Route 1 (US 1; Philips Highway), in Jacksonville, Florida to SR A1A (Third Street), in Jacksonville Beach, near the Atlantic Ocean, just north of Ponte Vedra Beach, and includes a bridge over the Intracoastal Waterway. To locals, the road is better known as J. Turner Butler Boulevard, Butler Boulevard, or JTB. Despite being named as a boulevard, the road is a completely limited-access expressway with the exception of the westernmost 0.5 miles (800 meters) between US 1 and Interstate 95 (I-95). It was constructed in sections by the Jacksonville Transportation Authority (before 1971, the Jacksonville Expressway Authority). The first section opened in 1979, but the entire road was not completed until 1997.

== Route description ==
SR 202 begins at U.S. Route 1 (Philips Highway) and starts its run east as a divided, six lane surface street, going east towards I-95 and becoming a six lane freeway. Between SR 115 (Southside Boulevard) and Hodges Boulevard, the freeway is seven lanes, with the westbound lanes carrying four lanes going into town and the eastbound lanes providing three lanes going towards the beaches. The freeway passes many areas of residential development and office parks, as well as a turbine interchange with I-295 (The East Beltway) before passing through mostly marshland as it heads east towards the Intracoastal, before entering the Jacksonville area beaches and ending at SR A1A, just west of the Atlantic coastline.

=== Points of interest ===
St. Johns Town Center, a super-regional shopping mall, is located near the I-295 intersection, as is the University of North Florida. Further east, Mayo Clinic Florida is located near the interchange with San Pablo Road.

== History ==
The expressway is named for J. Turner Butler, a well-known Jacksonville attorney and Florida legislator who was instrumental in advancing various transportation projects in the region and the establishment of the Jacksonville Expressway Authority. J.T.B. was a toll road until 1988 when the JTA removed all the toll-collection facilities in Jacksonville.

When J.T.B. initially opened, it was described by locals as "the road to nowhere". The moniker has diminished over the years as increased growth in Jacksonville's Southside area, as well as at the beaches and northeastern St. Johns County, has transformed the road into a major commuter route. Because of the heavy traffic on J.T.B. and projected continued growth in the Jacksonville area, the Florida Department of Transportation, in the early 2000s, conducted a study on making long-term improvements to J.T.B. The study results recommended widening the road and designating "inside" express lanes with limited on and off points along the route, surrounded by additional "outside" local lanes, albeit at a considerable cost. While this was not implemented, most of the highway between I-95 and the Intracoastal Waterway was widened to three to five lanes in each direction in the early-to-mid 2000s.

The Arthur Sollee Bridge spans the Intracoastal Waterway and is known by locals as the "Whubba Whubba" bridge due to defects in construction that make for an amusing bouncy ride on the eastbound side of the roadway.

Between the summer of 2005 and December 24, 2008, an $80 million freeway-to-freeway turbine interchange was constructed at the interchange of J.T.B. and I-295, with the final piece to open being a flyover ramp from J.T.B. east to I-295 north.

Until late 2017, access to J.T.B. eastbound from I-95 southbound was handled through a traffic-signaled intersection that was located near the highway's western end. This configuration created significant congestion during rush-hours, causing traffic to back-up onto I-95. To alleviate this situation, a flyover was constructed during the mid-2010s from I-95 southbound to J.T.B. eastbound, along with other improvements to the I-95/J.T.B./Belfort Road/Salisbury Road interchanges. Under this new configuration, the signaled intersection remained in place but is now only used to provide access from I-95 to the Belfort/Salisbury/Southpoint commercial area since the new flyover merges into J.T.B. eastbound past the existing off-ramps in the Belfort/Salisbury interchange.

In 2022, work was completed to reconfigure the San Pablo Road interchange to a diverging diamond interchange format (with right-in/right-out access to Mayo Clinic).

== Improvements ==
In late 2022 construction began on a loop ramp in the southeast quadrant of the Kernan Blvd interchange that will replace the existing traffic light for eastbound J.T.B. traffic headed to northbound Kernan Blvd.

== Exit list ==
The entire route is in Duval County. All exits are unnumbered.

Location	mi	km	Destinations	Notes
Jacksonville	0.000	0.000	US 1 (Philips Highway / SR 5)	At-grade intersection
Jacksonville	0.189	0.304	Bonneval Road	At-grade intersection
Jacksonville	0.51	0.82	I-95 (SR 9) – St. Augustine, Daytona Beach, Downtown Jacksonville, Savannah	I-95 exit 344; western end of freeway
Jacksonville	1.11	1.79	Belfort Road / Salisbury Road	No direct entrances from Salisbury Road; westbound exit has right-in/right-out to Southpoint; access to St. Vincent's Medical Center Southside
Jacksonville	3.03	4.88	SR 115 (Southside Boulevard)	Cloverleaf interchange
Jacksonville	4.02	6.47	Gate Parkway	Access to St. Johns Town Center
Jacksonville	5.22	8.40	I-295 (SR 9A) – Jacksonville International Airport, Daytona Beach	I-295 exit 53; freeway-to-freeway turbine interchange
Jacksonville	6.29	10.12	Kernan Boulevard	
Jacksonville	8.21	13.21	Hodges Boulevard north	Southern terminus of Hodges Boulevard
Jacksonville	10.05	16.17	San Pablo Road (CR 101A)	Diverging diamond interchange; access to Mayo Clinic Florida
	10.358– 11.228	16.670– 18.070	Pablo Creek Bridge (Atlantic Intracoastal Waterway)	
Jacksonville Beach	12.65	20.36	South Beach Parkway	Eastbound exit and westbound entrance
Jacksonville Beach	13.042	20.989	SR A1A (Ponte Vedra Boulevard) – Jacksonville's Beaches, Ponte Vedra, St. Augustine	Trumpet interchange; access to Baptist Medical Center Beaches
1.000 mi = 1.609 km; 1.000 km = 0.621 mi: Incomplete access
