= Ponte Vedra Inn and Club =

Hotel in Ponte Vedra Beach, United States

Coordinates: 30°14′31″N 81°22′44″W

Ponte Vedra Inn & Club
- Club logo
- Interactive map of Ponte Vedra Inn & Club

Club information
- Location: Ponte Vedra Beach, Florida
- Established: 1928
- Type: Private
- Operator: Gate Petroleum
- Tota holes: 36

Ocean Course
- Designed by: Herbert Strong (1928); Robert Trent Jones (1947); Bobby Weed (1998)
- Par: 72
- Length: 6,817
- Course rating: 73.3
- Course record: 64

Lagoon Course
- Designed by: front 9: Robert Trent Jones (1961) back 9: Joe Lee (1977); Bobby Weed (1997)
- Par: 70
- Length: 6,022
- Course record: 64

The Ponte Vedra Inn & Club, located at Ponte Vedra Beach, Florida, is a AAA Five Diamond Award resort and the first country club at Ponte Vedra. The 9th hole on the Ocean course has the distinction of having the first island green ever built.

== History ==
In the early 1900s, Ponte Vedra was primarily an area of sand dunes, swamps, alligators, and palmetto trees. In 1912, it was discovered that these dunes were rich in rutile, ilmenite, and zirconium. These minerals were vital in the production of steel, which was in high demand. After this discovery, it was transformed into a mining town with worker's quarters, a post office, and a supermarket. The National Lead Company began mining ore and spurred development, which supported the war effort. After World War I ended, demand for the minerals decreased and the company decided to transform the beachfront property into a resort community, crowded with small seaside cottages. The Ponte Vedra Inn and Club debuted in 1928, attracting socialites from nearby San Jose, San Marco, Ortega, Riverside and Avondale.

Stockton, Whatley, Davin & Co. was a developer of Ponte Vedra Beach in the early 1930s and owned the Ponte Vedra Club. The resort became a favorite of the wealthy with guests and their families returning year after year. The 1937 clubhouse stands behind the lobby building and is still in use.

In the early 1980s, Gate Petroleum purchased the Florida real estate holdings of Stockton, Whatley, Davin & Co., which was then owned by Phillips Petroleum Company for $60 million. The purchase contained more than 16,000 acres (65 km^{2}) of land in northeast Florida including the Ponte Vedra Inn and Club.

== Renovation ==
In mid-1999 Gate began a $30 million renovation/expansion of the resort. A new clubhouse, pro shop and 3-story parking garage were the largest improvements, but the inn saw the addition of 20 guest rooms, as well as refreshing the existing structures.

The property was awarded the AAA Five Diamond designation in 2002 and every year since.

== Golf courses ==
The Ponte Vedra Inn and Club introduced the first golf course to the region in 1928, and Ponte Vedra is now known as one of the golf capitals on the East Coast. The golf facilities at the resort have a total of 36 holes on two courses. The Ocean Course was designed by Herbert Strong in 1928, redesigned by Robert Trent Jones Sr. in 1947, then again by Bobby Weed in 1998. The ocean breeze makes the island green on the 9th hole a challenge. The Ryder Cup was scheduled to be held there in 1939, but was cancelled when World War II began.

The front nine holes of the Lagoon Course were a Robert Trent Jones Sr. design and opened in 1961. It was 16 years before the back nine was built, laid out by Joe Lee. In 1997, Bobby Weed redesigned the entire course and then again in 2007, fixing irrigation issues, enhancing the landscaping, and changing the routing on several holes. The Lagoon is considered the easier course to play. The latest clubhouse renovation occurred in 2001. The course is limited to members and their guests or guests of the resort.
