= 1995 Jacksonville mayoral election =

- April 11, 1995; May 9, 1995
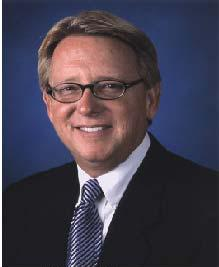

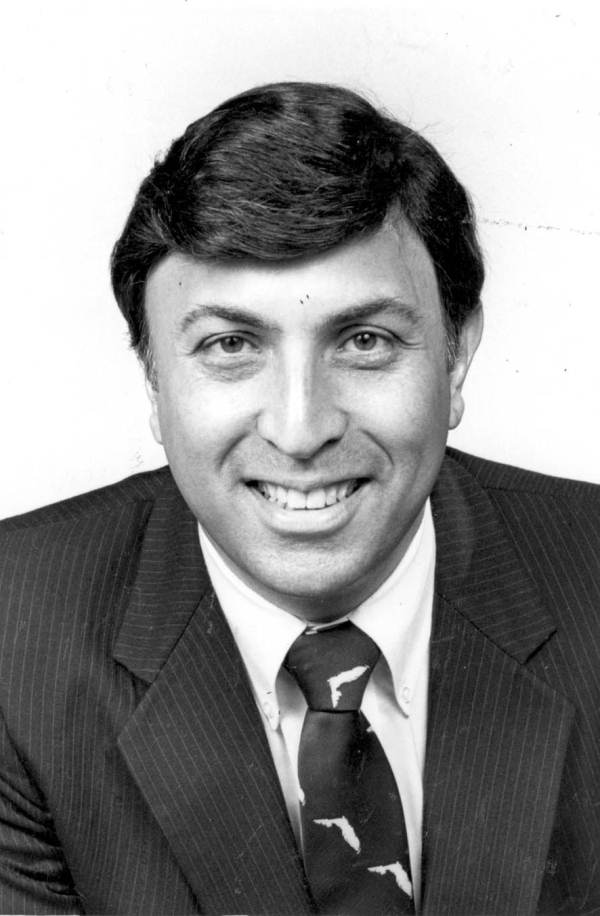

Candidate	John Delaney	Jake Godbold
Party	Republican	Democratic
First round	55,361; 32.42%	55,902; 32.74%
Runoff	81,058; 50.95%	78,047; 49.05%
Candidate	Tommy Hazouri	Harry Reagan
Party	Democratic	Democratic
First round	38,289; 22.42%	6,767; 13.44%
Runoff	Eliminated	Eliminated
Mayor before election
Ed Austin
Republican
Elected mayor
John Delaney
Republican

The 1995 Jacksonville mayoral election took place on May 9, 1995, following a primary election on April 11, 1995. The election was the first one to take place following the passage of a referendum in 1992 that provided for unitary elections, in which all candidates appeared on the same ballot regardless of party.

Incumbent Mayor Ed Austin, who was elected in 1991 as a Democrat, but switched to the Republican Party in 1994, declined to seek re-election. Austin's chief of staff, Republican John Delaney, ran to succeed him. Former Mayors Jake Godbold and Tommy Hazouri and City Councilman Harry Reagan ran as Democratic candidates. Godbold placed first in the primary with 33 percent of the vote, followed by Delaney with 32 percent. In the general election, Delaney narrowly defeated Godbold, 51–49 percent, becoming the first Republican to be elected Mayor since 1887.

== Primary election ==
=== Candidates ===
- Jake Godbold, former Mayor of Jacksonville (Democratic)
- John Delaney, former chief of staff to Mayor Ed Austin (Republican)
- Tommy Hazouri, former Mayor of Jacksonville (Democratic)
- Harry Reagan, City Councilman (Democratic)
- Steve Irvine, restaurant owner (Republican)
- A. P. McIlwain, retired shipyard executive (Republican)

=== Results ===
1995 Jacksonville mayoral primary election
Party	Candidate	Votes	%
Democratic	Jake Godbold	55,902	32.74%
Republican	John Delaney	55,361	32.42%
Democratic	Tommy Hazouri	38,289	22.42%
Democratic	Harry Reagan	18,235	10.68%
Republican	Steve Irvine	1,847	1.08%
Democratic	A. P. McIlwain	1,132	0.66%
Total votes		170,766	100.00%

== General election ==
=== Results ===
1995 Jacksonville mayoral general election
Party	Candidate	Votes	%
Republican	John Delaney	81,058	50.95%
Democratic	Jake Godbold	78,047	49.05%
Total votes		159,105	100.00%
Republican hold			
