= Dick Kravitz =

American politician

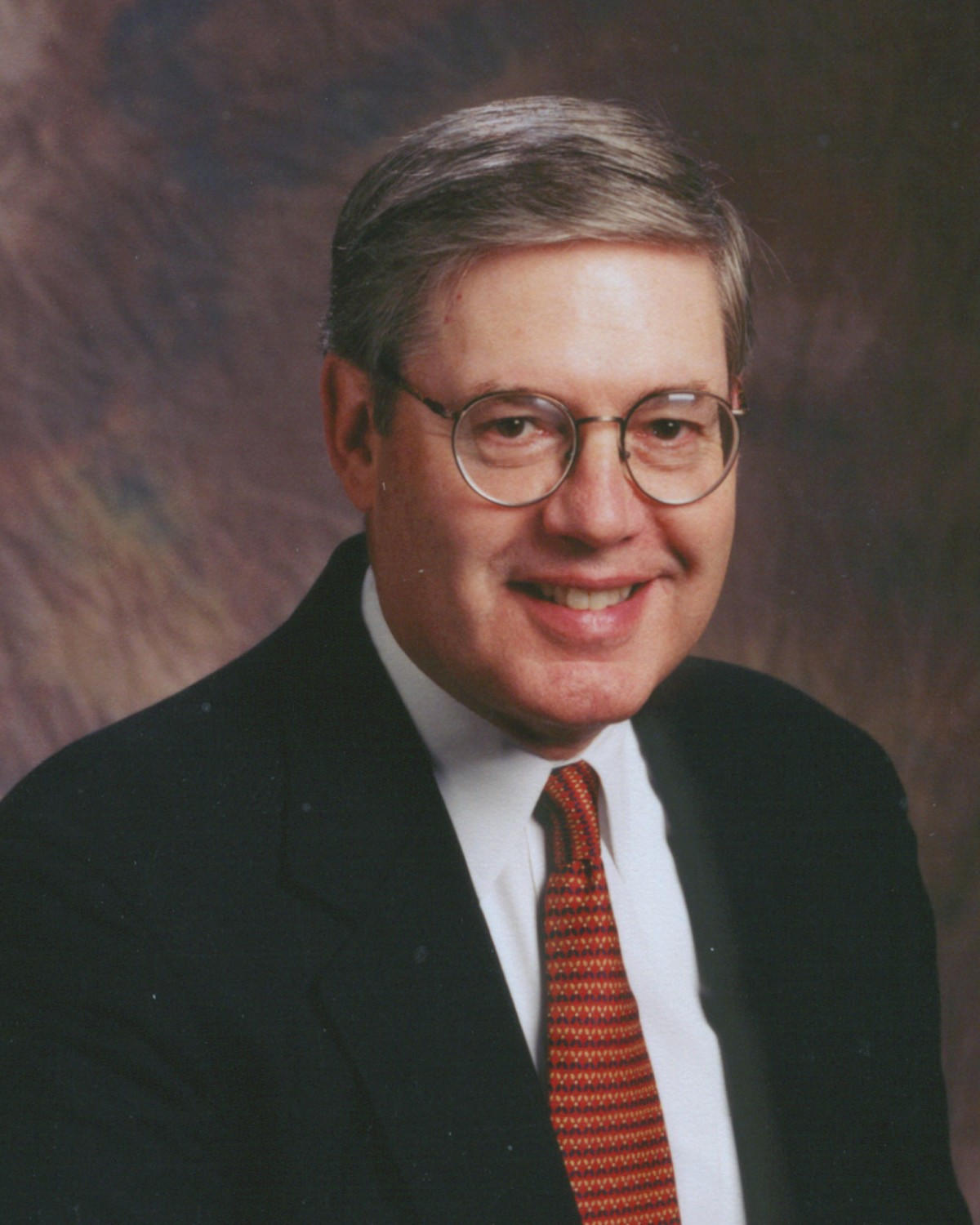

Member of the Florida House of Representatives from the 19th district
- In office November 7, 2000 – November 4, 2008
- Preceded by: John Thrasher
- Succeeded by: Mike Weinstein

Personal details
- Born: May 8, 1941 (age 85) Philadelphia, Pennsylvania
- Party: Republican
- Spouse: Shirley Levin Kravitz
- Children: Eric, Hirsh
- Education: Temple University (BS); Ohio University (MA)
- Profession: Insurance agent/business consultant

Richard H. Kravitz (born May 8, 1941) is a Republican politician who served as a member of the Florida House of Representatives, representing the 19th District, from 2000 to 2008.

== History ==
Kravitz was born in Philadelphia, Pennsylvania, in 1941, and attended Temple University, graduating with a degree in education in 1963. He worked as an English and social studies teacher in Philadelphia. Kravitz then attended Ohio University, where he received a graduate degree in sports administration in 1972. He moved to the state of Florida in 1972, and subsequently worked as general manager for the Jacksonville Suns, the Jacksonville Express, and the Jacksonville Tea Men. In 1979, he was appointed as the Executive Director of the Jacksonville Sports and Entertainment Commission by Jake Godbold, the Mayor of Jacksonville.

== Jacksonville City Council ==
In 1987, Kravitz ran for the Jacksonville City Council in the 4th District, which was based in Mandarin in southern Jacksonville. He defeated Jessie McCave Mayberry in the Democratic primary, winning 69% of the vote to his opponent's 31%. In the general election, Kravitz faced Ed Holtsinger, the only Republican on the Council. Kravitz defeated Holtsinger by a wide margin, winning 55% of the vote to Holtsinger's 45%. Kravitz was re-elected without opposition in 1991, and was re-elected without opposition in 1995 in the 6th District.

== Florida House of Representatives ==
In 2000, State Representative John E. Thrasher, the Speaker of the Florida House of Representatives, was unable to seek re-election due to term limits. Kravitz ran to succeed him in the 19th District, which included eastern Clay County, southern Duval County, and western Flagler County. He faced Monty Crook, the former Mayor of Orange Park, in the Republican primary, and campaigned on his support for growth management, lowering taxes, and improving public education. Kravitz ended up defeating Crook by a wide margin, winning 63% of the vote to Crook's 37%, and winning all three counties in the district. In the general election, Kravitz was set to face Democratic nominee Thomas Hughes, but several weeks before the election, Hughes dropped out of the race, and Kravitz was elected unopposed.

When Kravitz ran for re-election in 2002, he was opposed by Libertarian nominee Chris Batchelor. During the campaign, Kravitz was endorsed by the Florida Times-Union, which praised him for "represent[ing] the district effectively," and by the St. Augustine Record, which noted that he, and other local lawmakers, "have worked hard for St. Johns County." Kravitz was ultimately re-elected in a landslide over Batchelor, winning 84% of the vote to his opponent's 16%. Kravitz was re-elected without opposition in 2004 and 2006. He was unable to seek a fifth term in 2008 due to term limits.

During his tenure in the legislature, Kravitz primarily focused on criminal justice issues, working to increase funding for prevent programs that targeted at-risk girls and pushing to ban convicted sex offenders from living in close proximity to bus stops.

In response to the murder of Jessica Lunsford, Kravitz worked to pass Jessica's Law, which required sexual predators released from prison to wear electronic monitoring devices, noting, "It adds another layer of protection to our most vulnerable, our kids."

== 2011 Duval County Tax Collector campaign ==
Kravitz initially planned on running against former State Representative Aaron Bean to replace term-limited State Senator Stephen Wise in the Florida Senate. However, Kravitz dropped out of the race, and instead opted to run for Duval County Tax Collector instead.

In the 2011 election, he faced Jacksonville City Councilman Michael Corrigan and Ryan Taylor, an employee of the Tax Collector's office. During the campaign, Kravitz emphasized his sports business experience and background in customer relations. He attacked Corrigan for voting to raise taxes and fees on the City Council, and was subsequently attacked by Corrigan for supporting a $100 garbage disposal fee in 1989. In the primary election, Corrigan won a plurality, receiving 39% of the vote to Kravitz's 37% and Taylor's 24%, but because no candidate received a majority, a runoff election was held between Corrigan and Kravitz.

During the runoff elections, Corrigan and Kravitz shied away from criticizing incumbent Tax Collector Mike Hogan, as he was facing off against Democrat Alvin Brown in the mayoral election. Both candidates emphasized their support for consolidating office space, upgrading technology services, and improving efficiency within the office. Kravitz earned the endorsement of the Concerned Taxpayers of Duval County, while Corrigan was endorsed by former Jacksonville Mayor John Delaney. Ultimately, Kravitz lost to Corrigan, receiving 46% of the vote to Corrigan's 54%.

== 2016 State House campaign ==
Following the inability of State Representative Charles McBurney to seek re-election due to term limits, Kravitz announced his campaign to succeed him in the 2016 election. Kravitz faced Duval County School Board member Jason Fischer in the Republican primary in August 2016 and was defeated by Fischer.
