= List of mayors of Jacksonville, Florida =

Mayor of Jacksonville
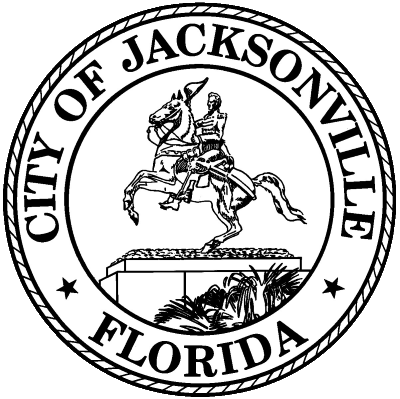
- Seal of the City of Jacksonville

- Flag of the City of Jacksonville

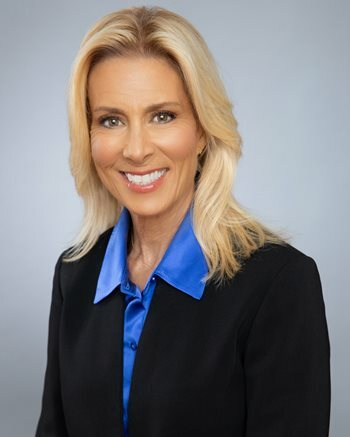
- Incumbent; Donna Deegan since July 1, 2023
- Style: The Honorable
- Term length: 4 years, renewable once consecutively
- Inaugural holder: William J. Mills
- Formation: 1832
- Salary: $206,218
- Website: www.coj.net/mayor/meet-the-mayor

The mayor of Jacksonville is the chief executive for the city of Jacksonville, Florida, and the administrator of Duval County. Jacksonville currently utilizes the strong mayor form of government in which the mayor currently has significant powers compared to the Jacksonville City Council. Ever since the land consolidation of Jacksonville as early as the late 19th century with the rest of Duval County, Florida the mayor was considered the administrator over the entire county, with the further consolidation in 1968 the mayor's office officially serves as the executive administrator for the county. The incumbent is Donna Deegan, who was elected in the 2023 election.

== History ==
The first mayor of Jacksonville, William J. Mills, was elected in 1832. A new city charter in 1841 changed the titled to "Intendant" until 1859 when it was changed back to mayor. The information on mayors of Jacksonville from 1832 to 1848 is limited, mostly due to the Great Fire of 1901 which destroyed some of the city's records. Most of the information available today was taken from newspapers published during the period.

There was no election for mayor in 1840, nor during the Civil War in 1862, 1863, and 1864. During the Reconstruction era, mayoral elections resumed but the position had no real power, with the city being administered by the United States Military. There was no set amount of time in which one person can stay as mayor.

On May 31, 1887, the city instituted a new charter, annexing several suburbs, including LaVilla, Springfield, Riverside, Brooklyn, East Jacksonville, and Fairfield. The mayor's term of office was also increased from one year to two. The mayor serving at the time, John Quincy Burbridge, had been elected on April 8 of that year, but the new charter required a new election to be held. On December 13, 1887, another election was held and Charles Bristol Smith, a Republican, won with support from members of the city's large African American community. After this, local Democrats petitioned the Florida State Legislature to change the city charter once again in an effort to curb Republican and black participation in local politics. The result was that direct election of mayors in the city was abolished from 1889 until 1893. Mayors during this period were elected by the city council, who were appointed by the governor of Florida.

The city's charter changed several times over the next several decades, and additional areas were annexed, expanding the city limits. The biggest change to local government, however, was the Jacksonville Consolidation, which took effect on October 1, 1968. In this measure, the Duval County and City of Jacksonville governments were consolidated, expanding the city limits to include almost the entire county. Mayor Hans Tanzler had just taken office on June 23, 1967; however, consolidation meant that he would have to run again for the office of mayor for the newly consolidated city government. Tanzler was re-elected and took office on March 1, 1968. Since that time mayors have been elected every four years. Voters in 1991 approved a two-term limit for Duval constitutional officers.

== Mayors of Jacksonville, Florida ==
The following is a list of mayors of Jacksonville:

=== Pre-Civil War mayors ===
#	Mayor	Took office	Left office
1	William J. Mills	1832	1835
2	Unknown	1835	1838
3	Stephen Eddy	1839	1840
4	None	1840	1841

=== Intendant period ===
#	Name	Took office	Left office
1	Unknown	1841	1844
2	Obediah Congar	1844	1845
3	Unknown	1845	1846
4	Joseph B. Lancaster	1846	1847
5	Oliver Wood	1847	1848
6	Unknown	1848	1849
7	Rodney Dorman	1849	1850
8	J. McRobert Baker	1850	1851
9	Rodney Dorman	1851	1852
10	Henry D. Holland	1852	1853
11	Isaac Swart	1853	1854
12	F. C. Barrett	1854	1855
13	Philip Fraser	1855	1856
14	F. I. Wheaton	1856	1857
15	George C. Gibbs	1856	1857
16	John S. Murdock	1858	1859

=== Pre-Civil War mayors revived ===
#	Name	Took office	Left office
1	Holmes Steele	1859	1860
2	Halstead H. Hoeg	1861	1862

There were no elections held in 1862, 1863, or 1864.

=== Pre-consolidation mayors ===
#	Name	Took office	Left office	Party
1	Halstead H. Hoeg	1865	1866	Democratic
2	Holmes Steele	1866	1867	Democratic
3	John Clark	1867	1868	Democratic
4	Edward Hopkins	1868	1870	Democratic
5	Peter Jones	1870	1873	Republican
6	J. C. Greeley	1873	1874	Republican
7	Peter Jones	1874	1876	Republican
8	Luther McConihe	1876	1877	Democratic
9	W. Stokes Boyd	1877	1878	Democratic
10	Luther McConihe	1878	1879	Democratic
11	Peter Jones	1879	1880	Republican
12	J. Ramsey Dey	1880	1881	Republican
13	Morris A. Dzialynski	1881	1883	Democratic
14	William McLaw Dancy	1883	1885	Democratic
15	Marshall.C. Rice	1885	1886	Democratic
16	Patrick McQuaid	1886	1887	Democratic
17	John Quincy Burbridge	1887	1887	Democratic
18	Charles Bristol Smith	1887	1888	Republican
19	Patrick McQuaid	1888	1891	Democratic
20	Henry Robinson	1891	1893	Democratic
21	Duncan U. Fletcher	1893	1895	Democratic
22	William M. Bostwick	1895	1897	Democratic
23	Raymond D. Knight	1897	1899	Democratic
24	J. E. T. Bowden	1899	1901	Democratic
25	Duncan U. Fletcher	1901	1903	Democratic
26	George M. Nolan	1903	1906	Democratic
27	William H. Baker	1906	1907	Democratic
28	William H. Sebring	1907	1909	Democratic
29	William S. Jordan	1909	1913	Democratic
30	Van C. Swearingen	1913	1915	Democratic
31	J. E. T. Bowden	1915	1917	Democratic
32	John W. Martin	1917	1923	Democratic
32	John T. Alsop, Jr.	1923	1937	Democratic
32	George C. Blume	1937	1941	Democratic
33	John T. Alsop, Jr.	1941	1945	Democratic
34	Frank Whitehead	1945	1949	Democratic
35	W. Haydon Burns	1949	1965	Democratic
36	Lou Ritter	1965	1967	Democratic
37	Hans Tanzler	1967	1968	Democratic

=== Consolidated city mayors ===
No.	Portrait	Name (birth–death)	Term	Party	Election
1		Hans Tanzler (1927–2013)	March 1, 1968 – January 2, 1979 (Note: Resigned from office)	Democratic	1971 1975
2		Jake Godbold (1933–2020)	January 2, 1979 (Note: Jake Godbold became acting mayor upon the resignation of Hans Tanzler on January 2, 1979, and was then elected mayor in a special election held on May 22. He was inaugurated on July 2.) – July 1, 1987	Democratic	1979 1983
3		Tommy Hazouri (1944–2021)	July 1, 1987 – July 1, 1991	Democratic	1987
4		Ed Austin (Note: Ed Austin, Jr. campaigned and was elected as a Democrat, but during his term as mayor he changed his party affiliation to Republican.) (1926–2011)	July 1, 1991 – October 20, 1994	Democratic Republican	1991
5		John Delaney (b. 1956)	July 1, 1995 – July 1, 2003	Republican	1995 1999
6		John Peyton (b. 1964)	July 1, 2003 – July 1, 2011	Republican	2003 2007
7		Alvin Brown (b. 1961)	July 1, 2011 – July 1, 2015	Democratic	2011
8		Lenny Curry (b. 1970)	July 1, 2015 – July 1, 2023	Republican	2015 2019
9		Donna Deegan (b. 1961)	July 1, 2023 – Incumbent	Democratic	2023

== See also ==
- Timeline of Jacksonville, Florida
