= Ed Austin =

American politician & lawyer (1926–2011)

4th Mayor of Consolidated Jacksonville
- In office July 1, 1991 – July 1, 1995
- Preceded by: Tommy Hazouri
- Succeeded by: John Delaney

State Attorney, Fourth Judicial Circuit Court of Florida
- In office 1974–1991
- Preceded by: Don Nichols
- Succeeded by: Harry Shorstein

Personal details
- Born: T. Edward Austin Jr. July 15, 1926 Shenandoah, Virginia, U.S.
- Died: April 23, 2011 (aged 84) Jacksonville, Florida, U.S.
- Party: Republican
- Other political affiliations: Democratic (formerly)
- Spouse(s): Patricia Ann Lynch (deceased); Connie Green (divorced)
- Education: Duke University; Fredric G. Levin College of Law

T. Edward "Ed" Austin Jr. (July 15, 1926 – April 23, 2011) was an American politician and attorney. He served as mayor of Jacksonville, Florida from 1991 to 1995. He also served as the first Public Defender for Florida's Fourth Judicial Circuit from 1963 to 1968, and served as State Attorney for the Fourth Judicial Circuit from 1969 to 1972 and again from 1974 to 1991. Austin was a Democrat for most of his career, but switched parties to become a Republican during his term as mayor, becoming the first Republican to serve in that position since the Reconstruction era.

== Early life ==
Austin was born in Shenandoah, Virginia. In 1944 he enrolled at Duke University, where he played college football as a tight end and ran track for the Duke Blue Devils. He earned a bachelor's degree and a master's degree while at Duke, and was subsequently employed as a teacher. He later joined the United States Army, where he served in the 101st Airborne Division as a paratrooper.

Austin was hospitalized with a back injury; in the hospital he met his future wife, Patricia Lynch, an Army social worker. In 1957, he was honorably discharged as a first lieutenant, and relocated to attend law school at the University of Florida.

== Career ==
Austin received a juris doctor from the UF College of Law in 1958, and was admitted to the Florida Bar on November 6, 1959. He worked in several legal positions, including a stint as Duval County's assistant solicitor. In 1963, he was appointed by Governor Farris Bryant as the first Public Defender for Florida's Fourth Judicial Circuit, which consists of Duval, Nassau, and Clay Counties. In 1969, he was elected State Attorney for the Fourth Judicial Circuit. Jacksonville Mayor Hans Tanzler appointed Austin to serve as the city's General Counsel in 1972, but he returned to the State Attorney position in 1974 and was re-elected four times.

In 1991 Austin resigned his position as State Attorney to run against incumbent mayor Tommy Hazouri, and won the election narrowly and became Jacksonville's 4th mayor since consolidation. His most lasting contribution as mayor is his River City Renaissance program, which funded urban renewal and revamped the city's historic downtown neighborhoods. Among the buildings constructed or renovated by the program are the Times-Union Center for the Performing Arts, the Sulzbacher Center, the stadium now known as EverBank Field, and the Jacksonville Zoo. Austin oversaw the city's purchase and refurbishing of the St. James Building, which would eventually become Jacksonville's new city hall. He was mayor at the time Jacksonville was awarded its National Football League franchise, the Jacksonville Jaguars. His support was instrumental in the founding of the Jacksonville Children's Commission and growth of the Jacksonville Symphony Orchestra.

During his term as mayor he switched his party affiliation from Democrat to Republican; according to his chief of staff John Delaney, he told his staff before leaving on a trip to China that he had become so disenchanted with the Democrats that he did not want to die as one if his plane crashed. In 1994, he announced he would not seek a second term as mayor. In the subsequent election he backed Delaney, who defeated former mayor Jake Godbold to become the next mayor of Jacksonville.

Austin was an imposing figure, a "strapping John Wayne-kind of guy", according to Delaney, who first worked for Austin as an intern in the early 1980s. His staff considered him a fair man with integrity and character who motivated his co-workers and mentored those he hired. Numerous individuals Austin hired and mentored went on to leadership positions in Jacksonville and the state of Florida, including Delaney, currently President of the University of North Florida; former Chief Justice Leander Shaw of the Florida Supreme Court, former general counsel Rick Mullaney, state Representative Mike Weinstein, Circuit Judge Brian Davis, Sulzbacher Center President Audrey Moran, and Chief Administrator Lex Hester.

== Personal life ==
Austin and his wife had three children and nine grandchildren. His wife of 39 years, Patricia, died in a car accident near St. Augustine in 1996; he was a passenger and was also injured, but recovered. In 2003, he married Connie Green; they divorced in 2006. The Ed Austin Regional Park in Arlington was dedicated in 2005, and a $150,000 endowed scholarship was established at the University of North Florida during 2008 in his honor. His grandson Austin Slater played college baseball at Stanford University and plays for the Tampa Bay Rays as of 2026.

Austin was recovering from heart surgery several weeks prior, but had not experienced complications. He died in his sleep on April 23, 2011. At his funeral on April 28, the casket was carried by an honor guard members from the Jacksonville Sheriff's Office and Jacksonville Fire and Rescue Department. John Howard, Bishop of the Episcopal Diocese of Florida delivered a eulogy, former Mayors John Peyton, Jake Godbold, Tommy Hazouri and John Delaney attended the service.

Legal offices
Preceded by new position	Public Defender, 4th Judicial Circuit; 1963–1968	Succeeded by Lou Frost
Preceded by William Hallowes	State Attorney, 4th Judicial Circuit; 1969–1972	Succeeded by Don Nichols
Preceded by Don Nichols	State Attorney, 4th Judicial Circuit; 1974–1991	Succeeded by Harry L. Shorstein
Political offices
Preceded by Tommy Hazouri	Mayor of Jacksonville; 1991–1995	Succeeded by John Delaney
