= Andrew Jackson High School (Jacksonville) =

Coordinates: 30.362255°N 81.654140°W

Andrew Jackson High School of Advanced Technology

Location
- 3816 N. Main St. Jacksonville, Florida; USA

Information
- Type: Public/Magnet School
- Motto: Embrace the Past, Excel in the Present, Build for the Future
- Established: 1927
- Principal: Truitte Moreland
- Staff: 38.00 (FTE)
- Enrollment: 837 (2023-2024)
- Student to teacher ratio: 22.03
- Campus: Urban
- Colors: Red and white
- Mascot: Tiger
- Nickname: School of Advanced Technology
- Website: https://dcps.duvalschools.org/o/ajhs

Andrew Jackson High School of Advanced Technology, A Dedicated Magnet School is the oldest fully accredited high school in Duval County, Florida. It is located just north of downtown Jacksonville on Main Street (U.S. Highway 17). It opened in 1927, the same year the city opened Robert E. Lee High School (now Riverside High School). It was originally an all-white school, but the school became integrated in 1970. It is named for U.S. President Andrew Jackson, an important figure in the history of Florida, after whom the city of Jacksonville is also named.

Jackson has the city's oldest athletic rivalry with Riverside High School (formerly Robert E. Lee High School). For many years the football game was played in the Gator Bowl Stadium on Thanksgiving Day, and it was a major event for students and alumni of both schools. The girls varsity basketball team were 2007 Gateway Conference Champions, beating out Samuel W. Wolfson High School. They won this award three consecutive years.

Jackson is the only high school in Duval County with an off-campus football stadium. The stadium is located about three-fourths of a mile north of the campus on Main Street, adjacent to North Shore Elementary School. Prior to the construction of this facility the Tigers played their home football games at the Gator Bowl.

In 2017 Andrew Jackson High School celebrated its 90th anniversary.

== Academics ==
Andrew Jackson currently offers the following magnet academies for students:

- Air Force Junior ROTC
- Cyber Security
- Early College Program
- Sports Medicine
- Video Game Design

Each magnet academy features a 4-year course progression to provide students with the fundamental skills to succeed in their chosen field. Students are given opportunities to earn industry relevant certifications, participate in internships and job shadowing, take field trips, and enroll in rigorous courses focused on their academy of choice.

== Notable alumni ==
- Professor Backwards - comedian with 23 performances on The Ed Sullivan Show.
- W. Haydon Burns - mayor of Jacksonville 1949–1965 and Governor of Florida 1965–1967
- Judy Canova - comedian
- James Collins - former professional basketball player for the Los Angeles Clippers
- Rita Coolidge - Grammy Award-winning singer
- Vernon Edwards - Former Professional AFL football player.
- Robert Edward Femoyer - Medal of Honor recipient and World War II Army Air Corps navigator
- Jake Godbold - mayor of Jacksonville 1978–1987
- Jamon Gordon - Professional European basketball player
- Connie Haines - big-band singer
- Jeron Harvey - Former Wide receiver for the Jacksonville Jaguars and current wide receiver for the Jacksonville Sharks.
- Tommy Hazouri - mayor of Jacksonville 1987–1991
- Alvin Heggs - former NBA player
- Wanda Hendrix - 1940s Hollywood actress
- Torrin Lawrence - former track and field athlete (sprinter)
- A. C. Lyles - long-time Hollywood producer
- Allama Matthews - former NFL running back and tight end
- Maxey Dell Moody Jr. - business magnate
- Rocco Morabito - Pulitzer Prize-winning photographer.
- Lou Ritter - mayor of Jacksonville 1965–1967
- Micah Ross - former wide receiver for the Jacksonville Jaguars
- T. Terrell Sessums - Speaker of Florida House of Representatives and Chairman of the Florida Board of Regents
- Dan Sikes - former professional golfer
- Leon Washington - former NFL running back, assistant coach for the New York Jets
- Louis Wolfson - financier, convicted felon, and one of the first modern corporate raiders
- Dennis Yost - lead singer of 1960s pop group Classics IV
