= Lou Ritter =

American politician

38th Mayor of Jacksonville
- In office 1965–1967
- Preceded by: W. Haydon Burns
- Succeeded by: Hans Tanzler

Personal details
- Born: September 27, 1925 Jacksonville, Florida, US
- Died: April 9, 2010 (aged 84) Palm Valley, Florida, US
- Party: Democratic
- Spouse: Judie Ritter
- Education: University of Florida

Louis Hampton Ritter (September 27, 1925 – April 9, 2010) was an American politician and lobbyist. He served as mayor of Jacksonville, Florida, from 1965 until 1967. A Democrat, he assumed office when W. Haydon Burns, mayor since 1949, resigned to become Governor of Florida. He was the last mayor to serve his entire term before the city was consolidated with the Duval County government.

== Early years ==
Ritter was born and raised in Jacksonville and graduated from Andrew Jackson High School in 1943. He served in the Army Air Corps during World War II, then attended the University of Florida where he served as student body president, graduating in 1950.

== Politics ==
Ritter decided to run for the Jacksonville City Council in early 1951, but was refused when he tried to file his intention with the clerk of the court, as he had been at school in Gainesville and not physically living in Duval County. He filed suit to challenge the residency requirement and prevailed less than two weeks before the first primary. The publicity from the court challenge helped him win the election, and at 23, he became the youngest city councilman in Jacksonville's history. Two years later, Ritter was elected by his fellow councilmen as Council President. He was elected as Commissioner of Highways, Sewers & Airports in 1955 and served for nearly 10 years. Ritter initiated the planning and pushed for the current Jacksonville International Airport. Construction began in 1965 and the facility opened in October, 1968. He implemented a building code which required and enforced minimum housing standards. Ritter also began a master sewer plan for the city. In 1960, Ritter helped run John F. Kennedy's presidential campaign in Florida.

== Mayor ==
W. Haydon Burns, who had served as Mayor of Jacksonville since 1949, successfully ran for Governor of Florida in fall 1964, a year after being re-elected mayor. The city council nominated Ritter, then serving in the City Commission, to fill Burns' remaining term, and the county commission approved his appointment. This was the period of time immediately following passage of the Civil Rights Act of 1964. Jacksonville had a history of racial segregation and violence, but Ritter was credited with keeping the fight over civil rights from tearing the city apart. He was a progressive who supported the Civil Rights Movement and welcomed federal assistance for the city's urban renewal efforts. He appointed blacks to city advisory boards, started the anti-poverty agency, Greater Jacksonville Economic Opportunity, and integrated the Jacksonville Police Department. One of the officers he appointed was young patrolman Nat Glover, who was later elected Sheriff of Jacksonville in 1995. Ritter was quoted in a 2002 interview for the Financial News and Daily Record:

Nat Glover (Jacksonville Sheriff 1995-2003). I appointed him patrolman when I was mayor. In 1965, we had a segregated police department. A black officer could not arrest a white person. When the black officers were recruited, they had their own precinct over on the west side of LaVilla and were given passed down uniforms."

During the terms of Mayor Burns, the good ol' boy network was the de facto standard among those in government. Cronyism and rampant corruption were common. In the early 1960s, a grand jury indicted eleven officials including councilmen, commissioners, the city auditor, the county purchasing agent and the city tax assessor. Ritter was never implicated, but the prevailing mood in the city was anti-incumbent. Ritter ran for election for the 1967 term, but was defeated by Hans Tanzler, a local judge. According to historian James B. Crooks,

Ritter had ambitious plans for a progressive Jacksonville. [He] was popular and had a substantial record of achievement as mayor. Under normal circumstances he would have won re-election handily. But 1967 was different, and Tanzler epitomized the nonpartisan reformer advocating open and honest government without spoils or patronage.

== Later life ==
Ritter never ran for political office again. He worked for the Office of Economic Opportunity as Director Sargent Shriver's executive assistant during President Lyndon Johnson's administration. After leaving Washington, D.C., Florida governor Reubin Askew appointed him as secretary of the Florida Department of Professional and Occupational Regulation from 1971 to 1974. Subsequently, Ritter founded a lobbying firm in Tallahassee. Florida Funeral directors were his first client, but there have been many others, including golf professionals, the swimming pool industry and dry cleaners.

The Federal Bureau of Investigation staged an undercover sting operation in 1981 using a convicted felon who was trying to obtain a state liquor license. Several prominent Jacksonvillians were indicted, including Ritter, who was accused of accepting money illegally. Ritter was acquitted by a federal judge in 1982.

Ritter suffered a heart attack in 2000 and received quadruple bypass surgery which slowed his pace, but only slightly. Prior to his death, he was writing a book about politics in Jacksonville from 1930 through the 1960s. Louis Ritter died at his home in Palm Valley on April 9, 2010, after a battle with cancer. He was 84.

Political offices
Preceded by W. Haydon Burns	Mayor of Jacksonville; 1965–1967	Succeeded by Hans Tanzler
