= W. Haydon Burns =

American politician (1912–1987)

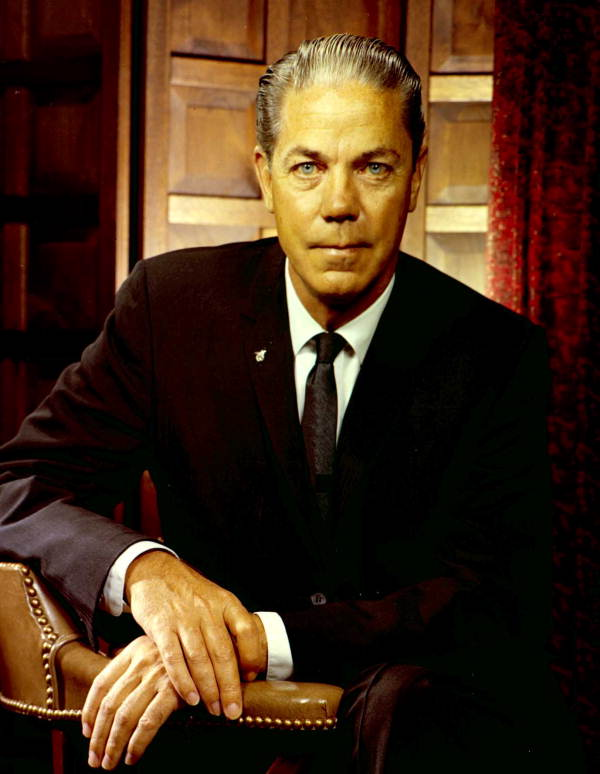

35th Governor of Florida
- In office January 5, 1965 – January 3, 1967
- Preceded by: C. Farris Bryant
- Succeeded by: Claude R. Kirk Jr.

35th Mayor of Jacksonville
- In office June 24, 1949 – January 5, 1965
- Preceded by: Frank Whitehead
- Succeeded by: Lou Ritter

18th President of the United States Conference of Mayors
- In office 1961–1962
- Preceded by: Richardson Dilworth
- Succeeded by: Anthony J. Celebrezze

Personal details
- Born: William Haydon Burns; March 17, 1912 Chicago, Illinois, U.S.
- Died: November 22, 1987 (aged 75) Jacksonville, Florida, U.S.
- Party: Democratic
- Spouse: Mildred Carlyon (m. 1934)
- Children: 2
- Profession: Politician, business consulting

Military service
- Allegiance: United States
- Branch/service: United States Navy
- Battles/wars: World War II

William Haydon Burns (March 17, 1912 – November 22, 1987) was an American businessman, segregationist politician, and World War II veteran who served as the 35th Governor of Florida from 1965 to 1967. A member of the Democratic Party, he was Mayor of Jacksonville, Florida from 1949 to 1965.

In October 1965, Burns was the first person to publicly announce the planned opening of Walt Disney World in Orlando, Florida, calling the new theme park "the greatest attraction in the history of Florida".

== Early life ==
Burns was born in Chicago, Illinois. His family moved to Jacksonville in 1922, where he attended Andrew Jackson High School before going on to attend Babson College in Massachusetts. Before the outbreak of World War II he was an appliance salesman and a flight school operator. During the war, he joined the U.S. Navy and was posted as a technical officer in the office of the Secretary of the Navy. Following the war, he returned to Jacksonville and began a public relations and business consulting firm and worked selling appliances.

== Mayor of Jacksonville ==
In 1949 Burns, a segregationist, announced his intention to run for Mayor of Jacksonville against incumbent C. Frank Whitehead. He defeated Whitehead in the Democratic Party primary, and then faced Jacksonville businessman William Ashley, a Democrat running as a political independent, in the general election – an unusual occurrence, as Democrats had been dominant in city politics for decades. On June 21, 1949, Burns defeated Ashley to become the mayor of Jacksonville.

Burns's first term was an abbreviated two-year stint; he was thereafter re-elected four times, the longest consecutive stint of any mayor in the city's history. During his time in the mayor's office, he oversaw massive growth in Jacksonville. He promoted the city around the world in an attempt to lure international investments and to get corporations to relocate offices to the city. He commissioned the production of a slide show called "The Jacksonville Story". Hundreds of audiences around the world saw it. The American National Exhibit showed a film version in the Soviet Union. Burns personally made presentations at The Hague and in Israel.

He was elected president of the U.S. Conference of Mayors, president of the Florida League of Municipalities, and delegate to the International Congress of Municipalities. While mayor, he won tax breaks for insurance companies and Prudential Insurance relocated from New Jersey to a skyscraper in Jacksonville. Other insurance companies followed, and Jacksonville became known as the insurance capital of the South.

A new courthouse and City Hall were built on the site of rotten wharves, and a long-promised Civic Auditorium was built on the banks of the St. John's River. Jacksonville Memorial Coliseum and Sam W. Wolfson Baseball Park made the city thoroughly modern. The Atlantic Coast Line Railroad, today CSX, moved from Wilmington, North Carolina, to the Jacksonville riverfront. The world's largest Sears Roebuck store opened on what once was skid row. A modern expressway system took shape and the city got the Jacksonville Suns minor league baseball franchise and a minor league hockey team.

=== Controversy ===
The city faced many problems during Burns's term. As a segregationist running on his ability to control Jacksonville’s racial conflicts, he deputized firefighters to strengthen the city’s police force to resist integration. Racial violence ignited on August 27, 1960, during a protest to integrate downtown lunch counters in the Hemming Park shopping area. Segregationists responded by attacking the protesters with baseball bats and ax handles; the day is remembered as Ax Handle Saturday. Burns tried to blame the incident on visitors but the police chief attributed the attacks to locals.

=== Run for governor ===
One of his final acts as mayor was his handling of the Hotel Roosevelt fire in downtown. Although 23 people died, many other hotel guests survived. In 1964 he announced he would be stepping down as mayor to run for Governor of Florida. City Commissioner Lou Ritter was appointed to take his place.

== Governorship ==
Burns defeated Republican Charles Holley in the November 3 general election to become Governor of Florida. He was sworn in on January 5, 1965, to serve an abbreviated two-year term. This short term came about because the cycle of gubernatorial elections was changed so as not to coincide with presidential election years. While in office, he oversaw progress in the development of a new state constitution, as well as new areas of outdoor recreation and industry. Also, Governor Burns opposed the death penalty and allowed no executions (the last pre-Furman execution in Florida took place in 1964).

In 1961 and 1962, he served as president of the United States Conference of Mayors.

=== Disney World ===
On November 15, 1965, at a news conference in Orlando, Governor Burns introduced Walt and Roy Disney to Florida as they announced that the state would be the location of their "East Coast Disneyland", Walt Disney World.

=== 1966 campaign ===
The 1966 gubernatorial elections pitted the sitting governor against Robert King High, a popular Miami politician. This primary was significant because Burns represented the conservative wing of the Democratic Party and High was the choice of the liberals from South Florida. Governor Burns lost the 1966 Democratic primary and then did not support High in the general election. Political observers in Florida point to High's supposed failure to obtain such endorsement from Burns because of Burns's conservative views on civil rights. This left the party divided in the face of united Republican support for Claude Kirk. He left office on January 3, 1967, as the first Democratic Governor of Florida in history to be succeeded by a Republican since Reconstruction.

== Post-governorship ==
Haydon Burns Library in 1968

After his term ended, the governor returned to private business consulting in Jacksonville. In 1971, he made an attempt to be reelected mayor, but he was defeated by incumbent Hans Tanzler in the Democratic primary. Many of the projects that he helped to create, such as the Civic Auditorium, rebuilt in 1996 and renamed the Times-Union Center for the Performing Arts, Wolfson Park, City Hall and the Jacksonville Coliseum, have all been replaced with newer structures. However, his work for the city's growth remains evident today. Haydon Burns remained in Jacksonville until his death in 1987.

Jacksonville's main public library, built in 1965, was named the Haydon Burns Library in honor of the former mayor. It was designed by Taylor Hardwick, a local architect who designed many local structures built in Jacksonville. From 1965 to 2005 it was the main library of Jacksonville. In 2005 it was replaced by a new Main Library.

In 1966, the building located at 605 Suwannee Street in Tallahassee, Florida, opened and was named the W. Haydon Burns Building. It became home to the State Road Department, now the Florida Department of Transportation.

In 2004, the city of Jacksonville renamed the old City Hall, built by Burns, as the Haydon Burns City Hall Annex.

Party political offices
Preceded by C. Farris Bryant	Democratic nominee for Governor of Florida; 1964	Succeeded by Robert King High
Political offices
Preceded by Frank Whitehead	Mayor of Jacksonville; 1949–1965	Succeeded by Lou Ritter
Preceded by C. Farris Bryant	Governor of Florida; January 3, 1965 – January 3, 1967	Succeeded by Claude R. Kirk, Jr.
