= 1987 Jacksonville mayoral election =

- May 26, 1987
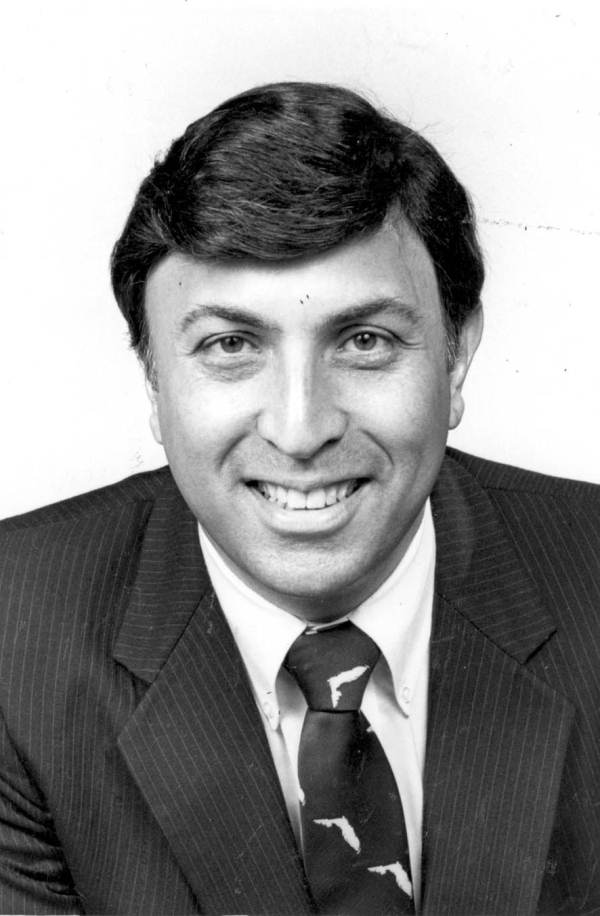

Nominee	Tommy Hazouri	Henry Cook
Party	Democratic	Republican
Popular vote	91,911	31,116
Percentage	74.71%	25.29%
Mayor before election
Jake Godbold
Democratic
Elected mayor
Tommy Hazouri
Democratic

The 1987 Jacksonville mayoral election took place on May 26, 1987. Incumbent Democratic Mayor Jake Godbold was term-limited and could not run for a third consecutive term. Former State Representative Tommy Hazouri won the Democratic primary against former State Representative John Lewis, and faced City Council President Henry Cook, the Republican nominee, in the general election. Hazouri defeated Cook in a landslide, winning 75 percent of the vote to Cook's 25 percent.

== Democratic primary ==
=== Candidates ===
- Tommy Hazouri, former State Representative
- John Lewis, former State Representative
- Doug Milne, attorney
- Dick Burroughs, former chief of staff to Governor Bob Graham, former Secretary of the Florida Department of Business Regulation
- Sinclair W. Wilcox, traffic signalman

=== Results ===
Democratic primary results
Party	Candidate	Votes	%
Democratic	Tommy Hazouri	30,139	32.86%
Democratic	John Lewis	27,571	30.06%
Democratic	Doug Milne	23,732	25.87%
Democratic	Dick Burroughs	9,133	9.96%
Democratic	Sinclair W. Wilcox	1,149	1.25%
Total votes		91,724	100.00%

=== Runoff ===
==== Campaign ====
The primary runoff between Hazouri and Lewis was sharply negative, with Lewis telling the Florida Times-Union that Hazouri, who was born in the United States to a Lebanese-American family, could not be mayor because he was an "Arab." Hazouri attacked Lewis for his divisiveness, arguing, "He cannot provide the kind of leadership I can provide. Who can best bring the entire community together and not divide the community? Who can best work with the Legislature and the business community and all the citizens of Jacksonville?" Hazouri ultimately defeated Lewis by a wide margin.

==== Results ====
Democratic primary runoff results
Party	Candidate	Votes	%
Democratic	Tommy Hazouri	49,882	59.04%
Democratic	John Lewis	34,611	40.96%
Total votes		84,493	100.00%

== Republican primary ==
City Council President Henry Cook was the only Republican candidate to file and won the nomination unopposed.

== General election ==
=== Results ===
1987 Jacksonville mayoral general election
Party	Candidate	Votes	%
Democratic	Tommy Hazouri	91,911	74.71%
Republican	Henry Cook	31,116	25.29%
Total votes		123,027	100.00%
Democratic hold			
