= 2003 Jacksonville mayoral election =

- April 15, 2003; May 13, 2003
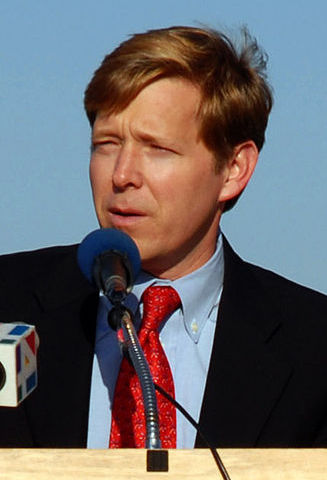

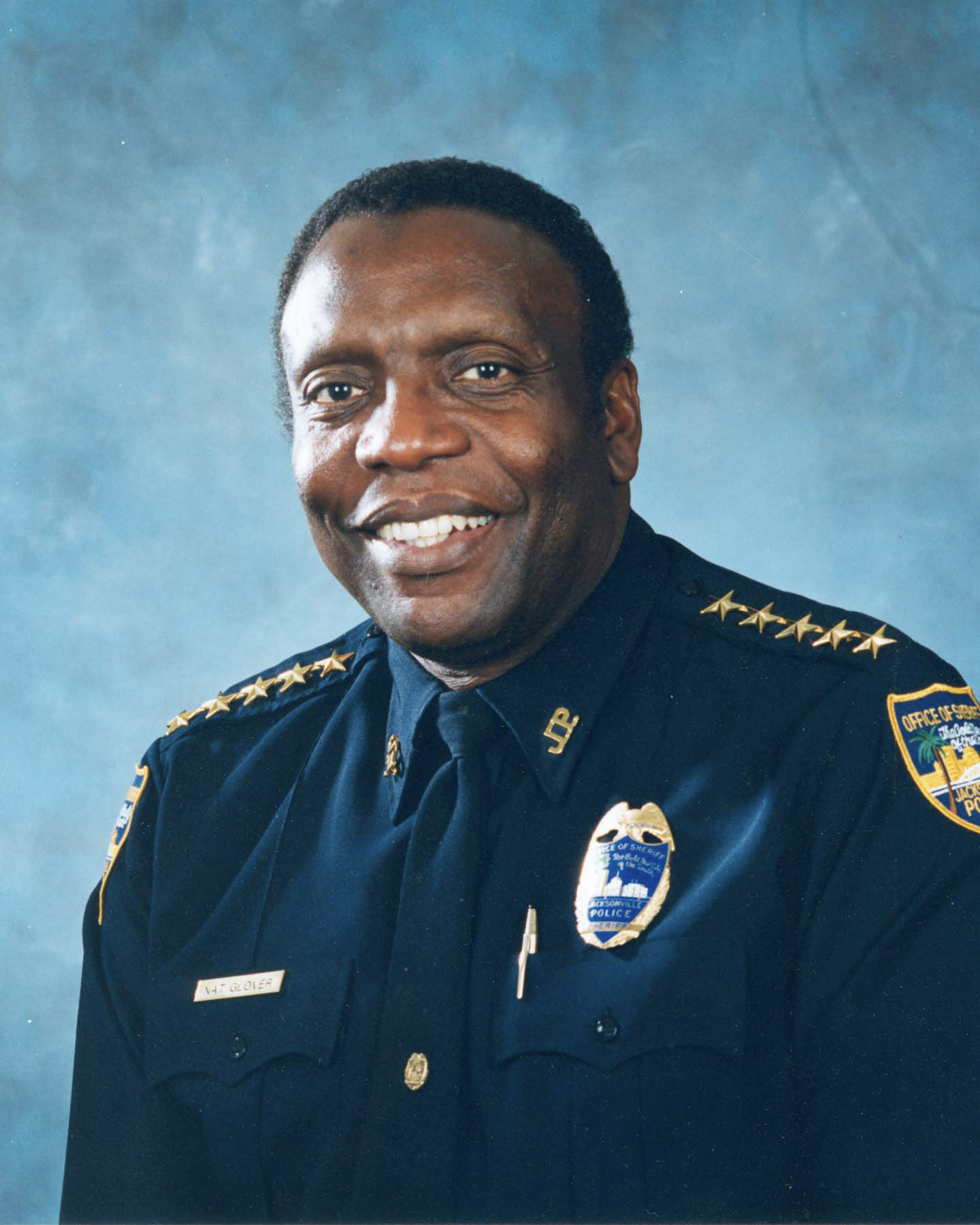

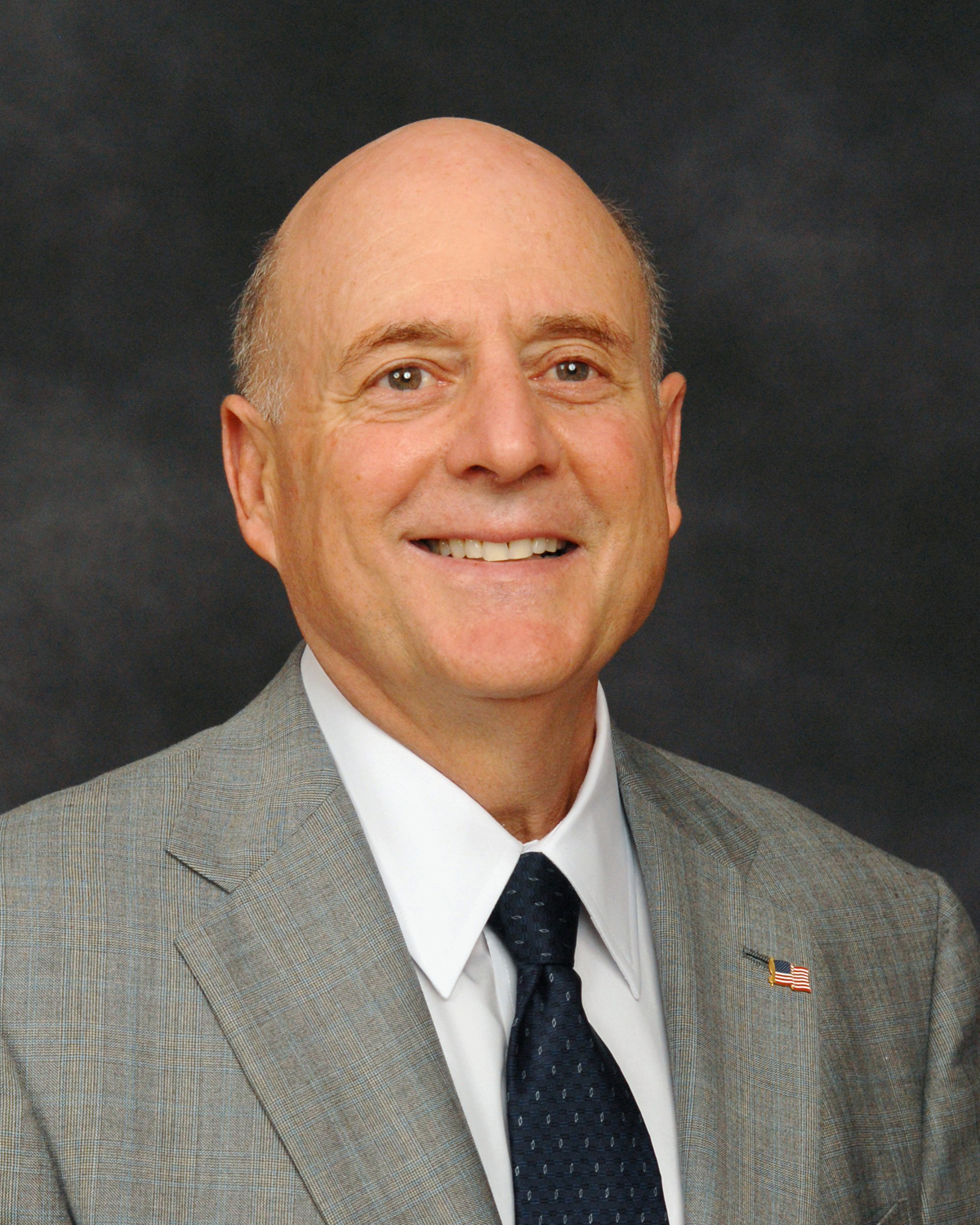

Candidate	John Peyton	Nat Glover
Party	Republican	Democratic
First round	44,369; 23.66%	52,431; 27.96%
Runoff	133,554; 58.00%	96,714; 42.00%
Candidate	Mike Weinstein	Matt Carlucci
Party	Republican	Republican
First round	42,085; 22.44%	37,442; 19.96%
Runoff	Eliminated	Eliminated
Mayor before election
John Delaney
Republican
Elected mayor
John Peyton
Republican

The 2003 Jacksonville mayoral election took place on May 13, 2003, following a primary election on April 15, 2003. Incumbent Republican Mayor John Delaney was unable to seek a third consecutive term because of term limits. Jacksonville Sheriff Nat Glover, a Democrat, placed first in the primary election with 28 percent of the vote. Republican businessman John Peyton narrowly defeated city official Mike Weinstein to advance to the runoff against Glover, winning 24 percent of the vote to Weinstein's 22 percent. In the runoff election, Peyton defeated Glover in a landslide, winning 58-42 percent.

== Primary election ==
=== Candidates ===
- Nat Glover, Jacksonville Sheriff (Democratic)
- John Peyton, businessman (Republican)
- Mike Weinstein, former executive director of the Jacksonville Economic Development Commission (Republican)
- Matt Carlucci, City Councilmember (Republican)
- Ginger Soud, City Councilmember (Republican)
- Betty Holzendorf, former State Senator (Democratic)
- Keith M. Myers, U.S. Navy veteran (Democratic)

=== Results ===
2003 Jacksonville mayoral primary election
Party	Candidate	Votes	%
Democratic	Nat Glover	52,431	27.96%
Republican	John Peyton	44,369	23.66%
Republican	Mike Weinstein	42,085	22.44%
Republican	Ginger Soud	5,386	2.87%
Democratic	Betty Holzendorf	4,548	2.42%
Democratic	Keith M. Myers	1,290	0.69%
Total votes		187,551	100.00%

== General election ==
=== Polling ===
Poll source	Date(s) administered	Sample size (Note: Key: A – all adults RV – registered voters LV – likely voters CV – certain voters V – unclear)	Margin of error	John Peyton (R)	Nat Glover (D)	Other / Undecided
SurveyUSA	May 9–11, 2003	544 (CV)	± 4.3%	54%	43%	2%

=== Results ===
2003 Jacksonville mayoral general election
Party	Candidate	Votes	%
Republican	John Peyton	133,554	58.00%
Democratic	Nat Glover	96,714	42.00%
Total votes		230,268	100.00%
Republican hold			
