= 2007 Jacksonville mayoral election =

- March 20, 2007
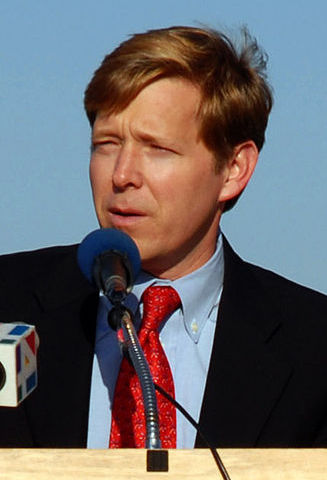

Nominee	John Peyton	Jackie Brown
Party	Republican	Democratic
Popular vote	78,327	24,423
Percentage	76.23%	23.77%
Mayor before election
John Peyton
Republican
Elected mayor
John Peyton
Republican

The Jacksonville mayoral election of 2007 took place on March 20, 2007. Incumbent Republican John Peyton was re-elected to second 4-year term, defeating the Democratic challenger and long time community activist Jackie Brown.

== Candidates ==
- Republican John Peyton, incumbent Mayor, running for a second term.
- Democrat Jackie Brown, local political activist who started the Movement For Economic Justice to aid the Black community of Jacksonville.

== Election results ==
2007 Jacksonville mayoral election
Party	Candidate	Votes	%
Republican	John Peyton (incumbent)	78,327	76.23%
Democratic	Jackie Brown	24,423	23.77%
Majority		53,904	52.46%
Turnout		102,750	
Republican hold			

Preceded by 2003	Jacksonville mayoral election 2007	Succeeded by 2011
