= Nat Glover =

American college administrator, police officer and sheriff

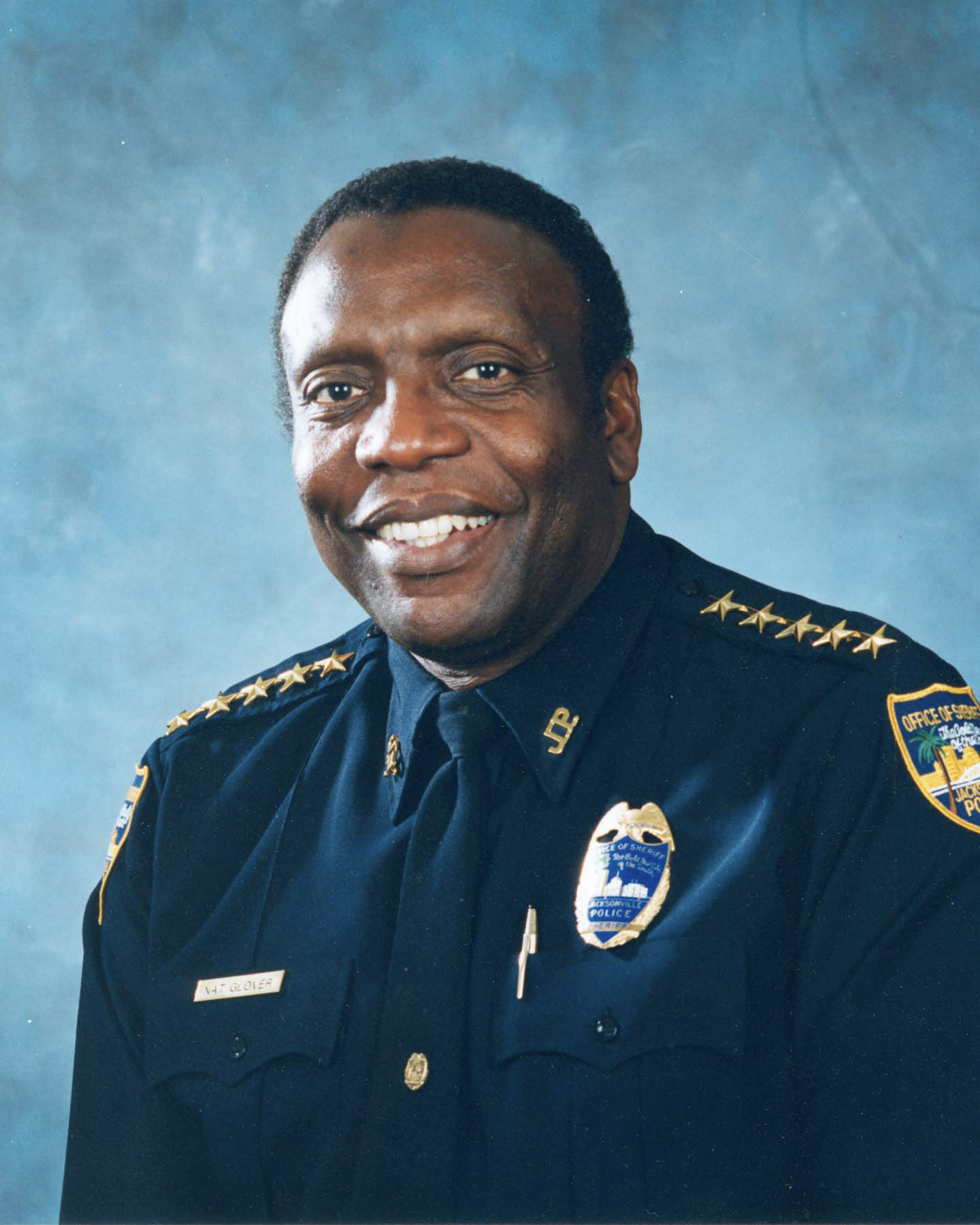

3rd Sheriff of Jacksonville
- In office November 20, 1995 – July 1, 2003
- Preceded by: Jim McMillan
- Succeeded by: John Rutherford

President of Edward Waters University
- In office May, 2010; Interim: May–February 2011 – May, 2018
- Preceded by: Claudette Williams
- Succeeded by: A. Zachary Faison, Jr.

Personal details
- Born: Nathaniel Glover Jr. March 29, 1943 (age 83) Jacksonville, Florida, U.S.
- Party: Democratic
- Spouse: Doris J. Bailey
- Children: 2
- Education: Edward Waters University, University of North Florida, FBI National Academy
- Occupation: President of Edward Waters University

Nathaniel Glover Jr. (born March 29, 1943), is an American former college administrator and former police officer and sheriff. Glover is considered a pioneer in leadership in Jacksonville, Florida. He was the first African American elected sheriff in Florida since the end of the Reconstruction. He was a mayoral candidate and served as the President of Edward Waters University, Florida's first institution established for the education of African-Americans, from 2010 to 2018. Previously he was the Sheriff of Jacksonville from 1995 to 2003, after serving in the Jacksonville Sheriff's Office since 1966. He was succeeded by John Rutherford.

== Life and education ==
Glover was born in Jacksonville and attended public schools there. As a young man he experienced the racism of the early 1960s. He inadvertently became involved in Ax Handle Saturday as he was walking home after his shift at a local restaurant. On that day, a group of 200 middle-aged and elderly white men, including some members of the Ku Klux Klan, gathered in Hemming Park, armed with axe handles and baseball bats, and attacked Civil rights protesters. Glover said he ran to the police, expecting them to protect him, but was told to leave town or risk being killed. A group of black youth who were called the "Boomerangs" attempted to protect the demonstrators. Police, who had not intervened when the protesters were attacked, now became involved, arresting members of the Boomerangs and other black residents who had attempted to stop the beatings.

Glover graduated from Edward Waters University in 1966 and received a master's degree from the University of North Florida; he also graduated from the 130th Session of the FBI National Academy. Glover was a starting linebacker and team captain for the Edward Waters College football team, where he was a teammate of Jim "Cannonball" Butler.

== Law enforcement career ==
Glover began his law enforcement career with the old Jacksonville Police Department in 1966. After Jacksonville Consolidation he became an investigator with the Jacksonville Sheriff's Office (JSO) in the Detective Division in 1969 and was promoted to Sergeant in 1974. In 1991, he was named Director of Police Services by Sheriff Dale Carson, one of the JSO's top positions. A political Democrat and a long-time police officer, Glover was elected Sheriff of Jacksonville in 1995, and was re-elected in 1999.

Glover was serving at the time of the Brenton Butler case in 2000, in which the 15-year-old Butler was falsely accused of murder. Butler confessed to the crime, but later testified that two JSO detectives, including Nat Glover's son Michael Glover, had physically attacked and coerced him into confessing. Butler was acquitted and the JSO and State Attorney's Office took the unusual step of apologizing to him. Michael Glover, who denied the allegation, retired from the Sheriff's Office to become a private investigator.

== Mayoral candidate and later life ==
In 2003, Nat Glover ran for Mayor of Jacksonville but was defeated by Republican candidate John Peyton, in the most expensive mayoral race in Jacksonville's history. An African-American had never served as mayor in Jacksonville, until Alvin Brown's election on May 19, 2011. Glover's campaign focused on education, economic development, and managing the city's growth. "Jacksonville is poised for greatness. I want to be the mayor that allows us to show the state how great we are," Nat Glover said.

The campaign was briefly marred by racism; after Matt Carlucci, a white Republican candidate, endorsed Glover after being defeated in the open primary, his business was vandalized with racial slurs against Glover. Vandals also spray-painted racist graffiti on Glover's headquarters.

After retiring from the Jacksonville Sheriff's Office Glover served on several boards, and was hired as a special adviser by University of North Florida President John Delaney, the former Mayor of Jacksonville.

Glover and his wife Doris J. Bailey have two children, two grandsons and a granddaughter. He says that the people he most admires are Martin Luther King Jr. and the Wright brothers. Nat Glover once stated "I always felt like if I could make the children and the senior citizens safe, everyone in between would be OK."

== Edward Waters University ==
During his career, Glover maintained a relationship with his alma mater, where he is a member of Omega Psi Phi fraternity. In 2005, he served on Edward Waters University's presidential search committee, which was formed after a plagiarism scandal led to accreditation problems and the resignation of President Jenkins. That committee took two years to select Claudette Williams in 2007.

Glover joined EWU's board of trustees in 2008, and when Williams resigned effective May 15, 2010, Glover was quickly approved as interim president. In February 2011, the position was made permanent. In the summer of 2014, Glover was a finalist for the HBCU Digest male president of the year. In an interview with the Jacksonville Daily Record, Glover recounted his journey to become president of his alma mater. In September 2017, Glover announced that he would retire in May 2018.
