= 1991 Jacksonville mayoral election =

1991 Jacksonville mayoral Democratic primary
- April 9, 1991
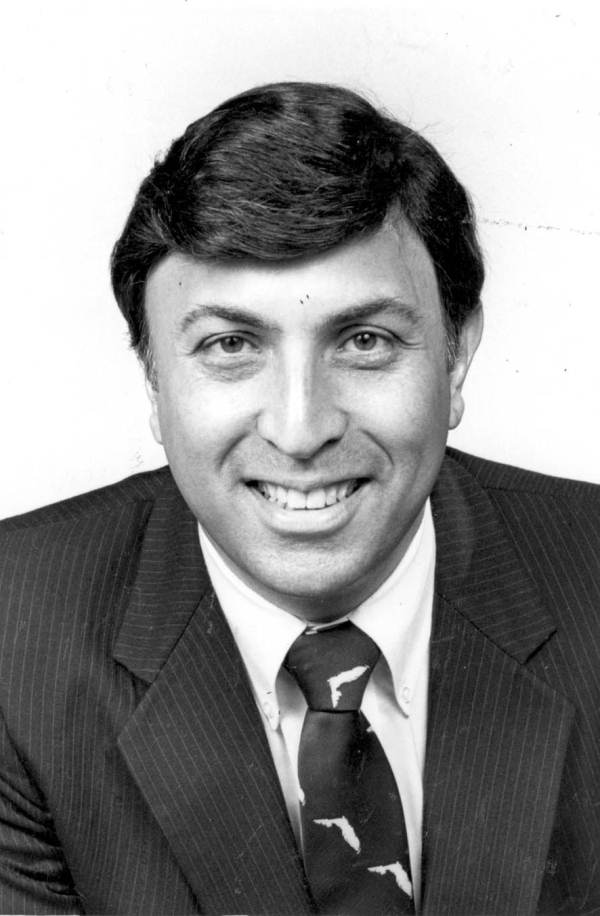
Nominee	Ed Austin	Tommy Hazouri
Party	Democratic	Democratic
Popular vote	53,719	51,900
Percentage	50.86%	49.14%
Mayor before election
Tommy Hazouri
Democratic
Elected mayor
Ed Austin
Democratic

The 1991 Jacksonville mayoral election took place on April 9, 1991. Incumbent Mayor Tommy Hazouri, a Democrat, ran for re-election to a second term. He was challenged in the Democratic primary by State Attorney Ed Austin. Austin narrowly defeated Hazouri, 51–49 percent. No other candidates filed for the race, and Austin was elected unopposed.

This was the last election to take place with separate party primaries. In 1992, voters approved a referendum that provided for unitary elections, with all candidates of all parties appearing on the same ballot. In 1994, Austin switched to the Republican Party.

== Democratic primary ==
=== Candidates ===
- Ed Austin, State Attorney
- Tommy Hazouri, incumbent Mayor

=== Results ===
Democratic primary results
Party	Candidate	Votes	%
Democratic	Ed Austin	53,719	50.86%
Democratic	Tommy Hazouri (inc.)	51,900	49.14%
Total votes		105,619	100.00%
