= Jacksonville Fire and Rescue Department =

Fire department in Jacksonville, Florida, United States

Coordinates: 30°20′13″N 81°39′41″W

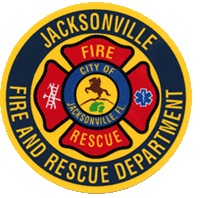

Operational area
- Country: United States
- State: Florida
- City: Jacksonville

Agency overview
- Established: April 20, 1886
- Annual calls: 151,237 (2018)
- Employees: 1470 (2019)
- Annual budget: $234 million (2019)
- Fire chief: Percy Golden
- EMS level: ALS

Facilities and equipment
- Divisions: 5 <! - Facilities & Equipment history -->
- Stations: 70
- Engines: 65
- Trucks: 15
- Squads: 5
- Ambulances: 68
- HAZMAT: 2
- USAR: 12
- Airport crash: 8
- Fireboats: 4

Website
- Official website
- IAFF website

The Jacksonville Fire and Rescue Department (JFRD) provides fire protection and emergency medical services for Jacksonville, Florida, as well as all unincorporated areas of Duval County.

According to a list of the thirty largest fire departments in the United States, based on staff size, JFRD is number eighteen.

Duval County has the fifth largest fire department in the state based on the number of fire stations. JFRD is among the largest departments in the state and the nation. The department is made up of six divisions, sixty-three fire and rescue station locations, a professional career force of roughly thirteen-hundred individuals.

== History ==
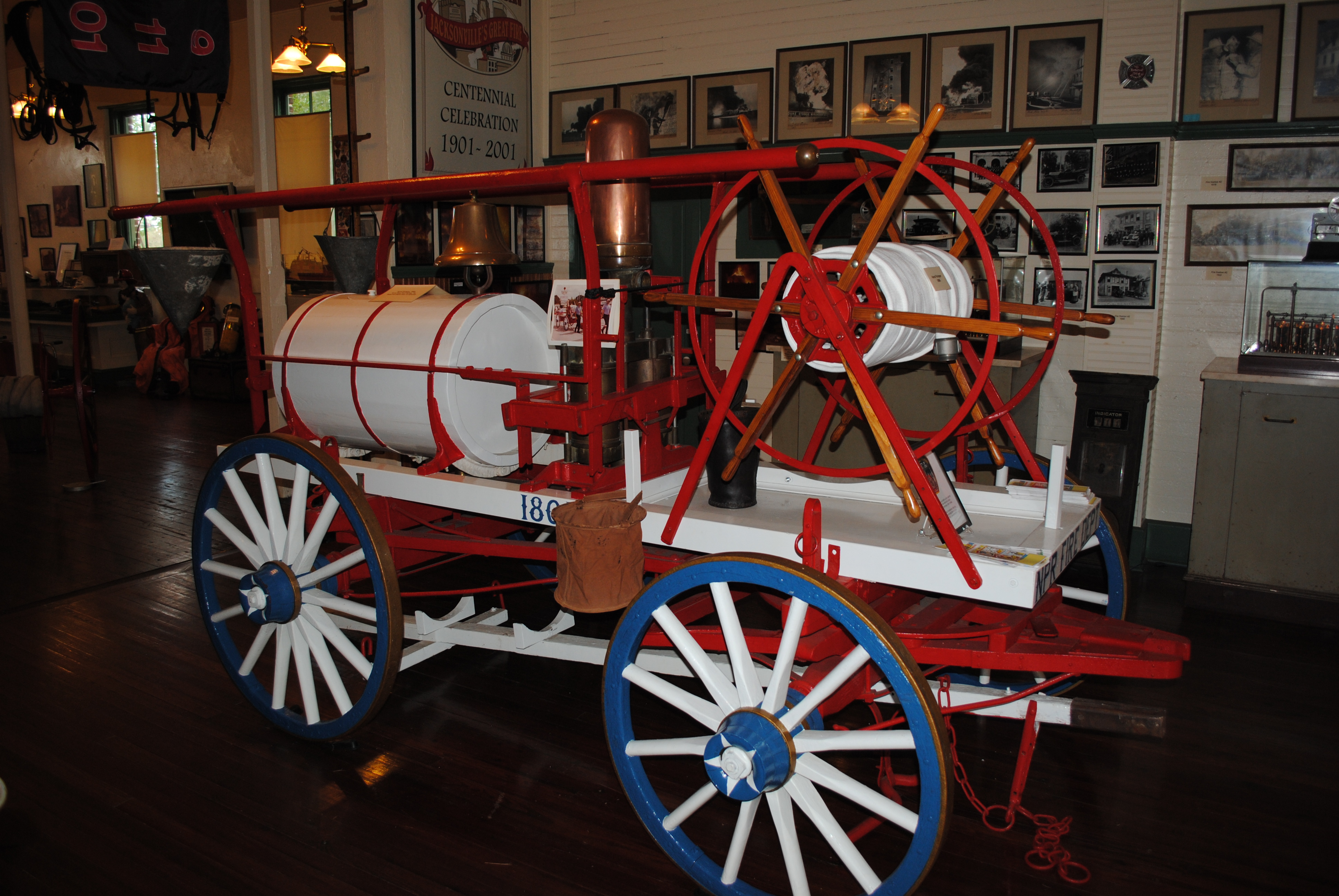
An antique hand pumper on display at the Jacksonville Fire Museum

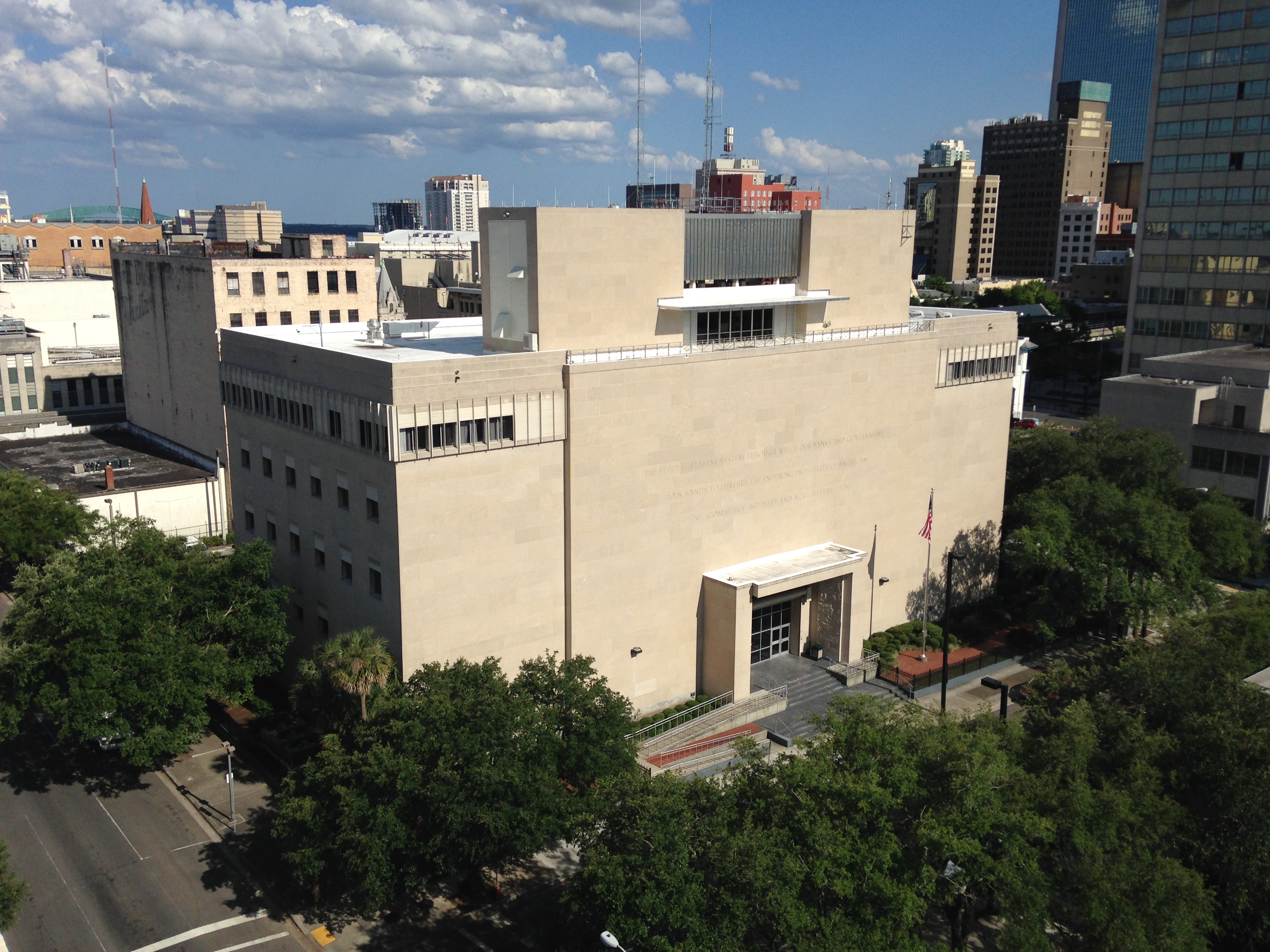
The current Fire and Rescue headquarters is housed in the former Federal Reserve Bank of Atlanta Jacksonville Branch

In Jacksonville's early days, citizens responded to fires by forming formed bucket brigades. In 1852, Jacksonville upgraded its firefighting apparatus with the acquisition of a hand pumper. The wheeled pumper had large handles on each side, which were pumped up and down in a seesaw manner to create hydraulic pressure. On April 5, 1854, the hand pumper was put to the test when a spark from the paddle steamer Florida ignited a fire at the docks along Bay Street between Ocean and Newnan. The pumper proved no match for the conflagration, which destroyed the pumper along with 70 buildings, devastating Jacksonville's business district.

The city's first organized firefighting force was formed on January 10, 1868, when a group of volunteers created the Friendship Hook and Ladder Company. Several other volunteer companies were formed by 1870, and together they came to be known as the Jacksonville Volunteer Fire Department.

In 1876, a group of 22 African Americans organized the Duval Hose Company. Their station was located near the intersection of Pine and Ashley Streets. The Duval Hose Company soon became one of the most active volunteer companies in Jacksonville.

On December 16, 1885, an African American named Henry Bradley, was killed when a flaming wall collapsed onto him. Bradley thus became the first Jacksonville firefighter to die in the line of duty. The public outcry about Bradley's death, coupled with rising insurance rates due to Jacksonville's lack of a professional fire department, led to calls for change. Several fire insurance companies serving Jacksonville threatened to withdraw their coverage. Fire insurance rates went up by 25%, which threatened to halt the city's development.

On April 20, 1886, the Jacksonville City Council passed an ordinance creating a professional fire department. Peter Jones, former mayor of Jacksonville, was elected as the city's first fire chief. He was provided 17 men to staff 3 stations to protect the city area of approximately 39 square miles. Jones remained fire chief through the Great Fire of 1901.

== Ambulance ==
In 1967, private ambulance services and funeral homes had been providing ambulance service to the citizens of Jacksonville for decades. Service was inconsistent and many patients died for lack of prompt medical treatment. Private ambulance companies and local funeral homes were in competition when Mayor Hans Tanzler directed the Jacksonville Fire Department to provide emergency ambulance service in the city. The fire department began meeting with Jacksonville doctors to develop a program to train firemen in advanced emergency medical procedures. Rescue vehicles were modified and equipped with modern medical equipment. Jacksonville has been a leader in modern rescue service since then and become a model for advanced life support units nationwide. In 2017, the Rescue Division celebrated the 50th anniversary as the world's first “fire-based” emergency medical transport service.

== Divisions ==
The Jacksonville Fire and Rescue Department has five divisions, all of which play an integral role in providing around the clock emergency response for the City of Jacksonville. Each one oversees specific tasks but come together to form JFRD.

- Operations is the largest division, working 24/7 responding to emergencies.
  - Special operations includes Technical rescue, Hazmat, Marine, Urban search and rescue
- Rescue provides initial medical care and assists operations personnel.
  - Special teams include SWAT medical, Bicycle Emergency Response, Honor Guard
- Emergency Preparedness confronts disasters and potential city-wide emergencies that include hurricanes, flooding, tornadoes and terrorism by planning and preparing.
- Fire Prevention conducts commercial property safety inspections, dispenses fire permits, teach fire safety and examine building plans.
- Training teaches new recruits to be fire professionals, provides continuing education to existing personnel, manages safety and fitness for the department and researches and evaluates all JFRD divisions.

== Discrimination controversy ==
In 1971, the JFRD became subject of a consent decree as part of a class action lawsuit, Coffey v. Braddy. The lawsuit was filed due to claims of discrimination against African-American applicants to the department. At the time of the suit, there were only two black firefighters in a department of almost 700. In 1984, the decree was modified to change hiring process at the JFRD. According to the decree, the department was required to hire a one-to-one ratio of black and white firefighters until the percentage of black firefighters equaled the percentage of blacks in the local population. This hiring restriction was fulfilled in 1992.

On August 8, 2006, the Jacksonville Human Rights Commission released a report after an investigation into a complaint of a racially hostile work environment. The complaint was filed in February 2006 after two black firefighters in the department arrived for duty and found nooses placed in their lockers. These charges were found to be inconclusive. The report found that, while operational performance was at a high standard, the off-duty behaviors of members of the department were a concern.
