= Jacksonville Jazz Festival =

- 1998 Jacksonville Jazz Festival poster
- Genre: Jazz
- Dates: Memorial Day Weekend
- Location: Jacksonville, Florida
- Years active: 1979-1981 (Mayport); 1982–present (Downtown)
- Founders: Jake Godbold, Mike Tolbert
- Organizer: City of Jacksonville, FL Division of Sports & Entertainment
- Website: jacksonvillejazzfest.com

The Jacksonville Jazz Festival is an annual Jazz Festival held during the month of May in Jacksonville, Florida.

== Events ==
MUSIC FESTIVAL: The Jacksonville Jazz Festival is an annual music festival that has been held for more than 40 years. The festival begins with the Jacksonville Jazz Piano Competition, followed by three days of live, free entertainment on multiple stages set in downtown Jacksonville.

JACKSONVILLE JAZZ PIANO COMPETITION: Performances are scheduled at the Florida Theatre and the outdoor stages in downtown Jacksonville. The festival kicks off at the Florida Theatre with the Jacksonville Jazz Piano Competition. Originally known as The Great American Jazz Piano Competition, five finalists compete for cash prizes and a chance to perform on the festival's main stage. In 1983, the first year of the competition, Marcus Roberts took top honors beating out a 16-year-old, Harry Connick Jr.

JAZZ MARKETPLACE

JAZZ JAM

SACRED JAZZ BRUNCH

== History ==
In 1979, Jake Godbold was elected Mayor of Jacksonville. He and aide Mike Tolbert founded the Jazz festival and envisioned it as an event that would help the struggling fishing village of Mayport. It began as a one-day free concert featuring regional talent and a major headliner. The producers expected a few hundred people to show up, but a crowd of 25,000 turned out. The following year, attendance was even higher and Mayport could not handle the crowds. The Mayport Naval Base was uncomfortable with such a big crowd on their border, so the event moved to the newly opened Metropolitan Park in 1982. It remained a free concert as costs were low (Dizzy Gillespie headlined the 1981 show for just $7,500) and sponsors were willing to support it. Churches and other groups provided food and drinks which helped make money. At one time, before Channel 7 decided to use it as a fundraiser, 100,000 people attended.

In 1985, the production was turned over to public television station WJCT and they used it as their primary fund-raising event for many years. In the mid-1980s, big-name entertainers started raising their rates to perform. The 1986 festival featured Miles Davis for approximately $25,000, more than three times the cost of the headliner five years earlier. Costs began to rise faster than sponsorship money, so the show in 1995 included a $5 admission to help cover the shortfall. Vic DiGenti, who produced the event from 1993 to 2000 stated, "We probably lost some of those people who just want to come and hang out, and drink beer."

In the late 1990s attendance rose to 20,000, but that wasn't enough to cover shrinking sponsorships and rising artists' contracts. After the show in 2000, WJCT announced their withdrawal of sponsorship, citing large losses, resulting in no festival in 2001 and 2002.

The City of Jacksonville resurrected the event in 2003 and named Tony Bennett the headliner. However, Bennett was the most expensive act in festival history. He was paid $100,000 for his 75-minute performance at Metropolitan Park, plus $10,000 for expenses. The festival in 2003 did not charge admission. It was a sunny weekend and nearly 60,000 people attended, but the festival's profits were half a million dollars short of its expenses. When it rained in 2004, attendance numbers fell to 22,000 and the festival lost another half-million dollars. In 2006, the city decided to begin charging admission, but the deficit stayed around $500,000. The 2007–2008 budget included significant cuts that required the festival to be scaled back. Saturday and Sunday music was limited to Metropolitan Park whereas, in 2007, concerts were also held at the Florida and Ritz theaters.
