= Alvin Heggs =

American NBA & CBA basketball player (born 1967)

Personal information
- Born: December 12, 1967 (age 58) Jacksonville, Florida
- Listed height: 6 ft 8 in (2.03 m)
- Listed weight: 225 lb (102 kg)

Career information
- High school: Andrew Jackson (Jacksonville, Florida)
- College: FSJC (1985–1987); Texas (1987–1989)
- NBA draft: 1989: undrafted
- Position: Small forward
- Number: 55

Career history
- 1995: Houston Rockets
- Stats at NBA.com
- Stats at Basketball Reference

Alvin Heggs (born December 8, 1967) is an American former professional basketball player. A 6'9" and 225 lb forward born in Jacksonville, Florida, he attended the University of Texas and Florida Community College.

Heggs participated in four games for the NBA's Houston Rockets in November 1995. He was also selected in the 2nd round of the 1989 CBA Draft by the Omaha Racers. He played two seasons in the CBA. In 68 games with the Grand Rapids Hoops, Omaha Racers and Oklahoma City Cavalry, Heggs averaged 9.9 points and 6.4 rebounds per game.

Heggs is currently living in Arizona, and is the general manager of Heggs CJDR, a car dealership.
