= Tommy Hazouri =

American politician (1944–2021)

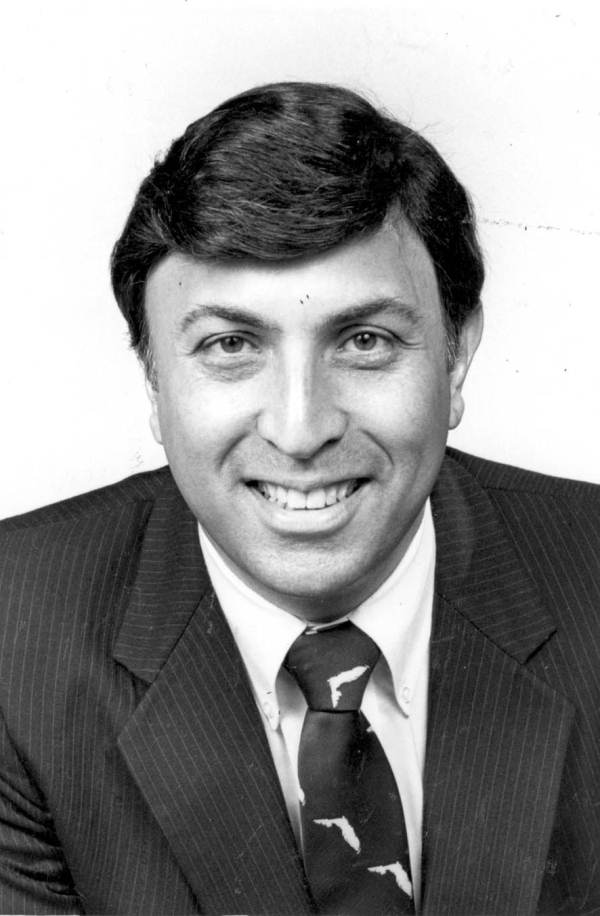
- Hazouri in 1984

3rd Mayor of Consolidated Jacksonville
- In office July 1, 1987 – July 1, 1991
- Preceded by: Jake Godbold
- Succeeded by: Ed Austin

Member of the Jacksonville City Council
- In office March 9, 2015 – September 11, 2021
- Preceded by: Geoff Youngblood
- Succeeded by: Nick Howland
- Constituency: At-Large Group 3

Member of the Duval County School Board
- In office 2004–2012
- Constituency: District 7

Member of the Florida House of Representatives
- In office 1974–1986
- Preceded by: Bill Birchfield
- Succeeded by: David Troxler
- Constituency: 21st district (1974-1982); 20th district (1982-1986)

Personal details
- Born: October 11, 1944 Jacksonville, Florida, US
- Died: September 11, 2021 (aged 76) Jacksonville, Florida, US
- Party: Democratic
- Spouse: Carol Hazouri
- Relatives: Donna Deegan (cousin)
- Education: Jacksonville University
- Profession: Politician

Thomas Lester Hazouri Sr. (October 11, 1944 – September 11, 2021) was an American politician of the Democratic Party. He served as a member of the Florida House of Representatives from 1974 to 1986, as the 3rd Mayor of Jacksonville from 1987 to 1991, and represented School District 7 in the Duval County School Board from 2004 to 2012. He was later an At-Large member of the Jacksonville City Council.

== Early life and education ==
Hazouri was born and raised in Jacksonville. He was of Lebanese descent. He attended Andrew Jackson High School and graduated from Jacksonville University in 1966.

== Career ==
Hazouri was elected to the Florida House of Representatives in 1974, representing the 21st district. He succeeded Bill Birchfield. While in the Florida legislature, Hazouri chaired the House Committee on Education, K-12. He also was a member of the House Committee on Appropriations Subcommittee on Education Funding. He was appointed by Governor Lawton Chiles to the Florida Ethics Commission and led the Sheriff's Task Force on Mental Health. In the 1981 reapportionment process, his district was renumbered the 20th. He served until 1986. He was succeeded by David Troxler.

Hazouri ran for Mayor of Jacksonville in 1987. He defeated fellow former State Representative John Lewis in a bitter Democratic primary election, and then easily beat Republican Henry Cook to win the general election and become Jacksonville's 3rd mayor after consolidation. During his term as mayor of Jacksonville he spearheaded a campaign to rid Jacksonville's roads and bridges of toll booths and implemented various environmental regulations aimed at getting rid of the city's odor problem. During his tenure as Mayor of Jacksonville, Hazouri welcomed the city's first contingent of visiting Canadian media personalities in September 1987, including Vic Phillips of Global Television Network and Chantale Roy of the French language TVA Network, both of whom broadcast live from Jacksonville. Hazouri was defeated for reelection in 1991 by Ed Austin.

Hazouri ran for Mayor of Jacksonville again in 1995 and 2003 but lost in the primary elections both times, the races ultimately being won by John Delaney and John Peyton, respectively. In 2004 he was elected to the Duval County School Board, and was reelected in 2008. He served as board vice-chairman for 2008 and as chairman in 2009. In addition to his work on the school board, he was president of Hazouri and Associates, a private consulting firm.

In 2015, Hazouri ran for the At-Large Group 3 seat on the Jacksonville City Council. He defeated Republican Geoff Youngblood and took office on July 1, 2015. He was elected as president of the Jacksonville City Council in 2020. He served as President of the City Council from July 1, 2020 - July 1, 2021. He was succeeded by Sam Newby.

== Later years and death ==
Hazouri underwent a lung transplant in July 2020 at the Mayo Clinic. He died at his home in Jacksonville on September 11, 2021, following complications from the transplant.

A special election for the vacant seat on the City Council was held on December 7, 2021. Democrat Tracye Polson and Republican Nick Howland each got roughly 36% of the vote. Howland won the February 22, 2022 runoff election with 51.8% of the vote.

== Personal life ==
Hazouri was married to Carol Hazouri, who has been a school teacher at Crown Point Elementary School in Mandarin for over 35 years. They have a son Thomas Hazouri Jr.. His cousin, Donna Deegan, was elected Mayor of Jacksonville in the 2023 election.

His son Thomas Hazouri Jr. a former teacher at Mayport Elementary School, is serving a seven year federal sentence after pleading guilty to distributing child sexual abuse videos.

Political offices
Preceded by Jake Godbold	Mayor of Jacksonville; 1987–1991	Succeeded by Ed Austin
