= Hans Tanzler =

American politician and judge

1st Mayor of Consolidated Jacksonville
- In office October 1, 1968 – January 2, 1979
- Preceded by: Office established
- Succeeded by: Jake Godbold

39th Mayor of Jacksonville
- In office June 23, 1967 – September 30, 1968
- Preceded by: Lou Ritter
- Succeeded by: Office abolished

50th President of the National League of Cities
- In office 1976
- Preceded by: Carlos Romero Barceló
- Succeeded by: Phyllis Lamphere

Personal details
- Born: Hans Gearhart Tanzler, Jr. March 11, 1927 Jacksonville, Florida, U.S.
- Died: July 25, 2013 (aged 86) Jacksonville, Florida, U.S.
- Party: Democratic
- Spouses: Ann Lyerly (m. 1948; div. 1971); LaMercedes Hutchins Woodard (m. 1973)
- Education: J.D., University of Florida, 1951

Hans Gearhart Tanzler, Jr. (March 11, 1927 – July 25, 2013) was an American politician and judge. He served as Mayor of Jacksonville, Florida, from 1967 to 1979. During his administration, the City of Jacksonville consolidated with Duval County, making him the last mayor of the old city government and the first mayor of a consolidated Jacksonville. He was a member of the Democratic Party.

== Early life ==
Tanzler was born in Jacksonville, and graduated from Robert E. Lee High School in 1945. He was an outstanding athlete, lettering in football, basketball and baseball, and Duke University offered him a football scholarship. When a fire at Lee High School incinerated his academic record, Duke declined to enroll him; however, the University of Florida would, and offered him an athletic scholarship. Tanzler decided to go to Gainesville, but with World War II still ongoing, he was required to serve 18 months in the United States Navy. After arriving late for the fall term, Florida football coach Raymond Wolf decided to redshirt Tanzler, and recommended that he play basketball to stay in shape. Tanzler was a walk-on for the 1946–47 Florida Gators men's basketball team, and averaged nearly 11 points per game. He became a stand-out player, scoring in double figures all four years, and was named third-team All-SEC in his senior year, when he became the first Florida basketball player to pass 1,000 points in his college career. He earned his bachelor's degree from Florida in 1949, then his Juris Doctor degree in 1951. He was later inducted into the University of Florida Athletic Hall of Fame as a "Gator Great". After graduating, Tanzler practiced law and eventually became a judge serving on the criminal court.

== Career ==
In 1967 Tanzler ran against incumbent mayor Lou Ritter for the Democratic nomination. He ran on a ticket of reform as a "white hat", a supporter of consolidation of the City of Jacksonville and Duval County governments. In those days, the Democratic primary was the real contest in Jacksonville. Tanzler defeated Ritter in the primary, then easily defeated Republican William Hembree in the general election. Two months later, on August 8, 1967, voters approved the Jacksonville Consolidation. This meant Tanzler had to stand again for mayor of the new government on September 26. However, no one else filed, thus he became the first mayor in Jacksonville history to be elected unopposed. When consolidation took effect on October 1, 1968, Tanzler became the last mayor of the old city government and the first mayor of a consolidated Jacksonville.

As mayor, Tanzler initiated a number of projects to revitalize Jacksonville's downtown with new revenues brought in by consolidation. Among the projects were the creation of what is now the Downtown Campus of Florida State College at Jacksonville, the construction of a large-scale public health facility, and the completion of major commercial construction projects including the skyscraper now known as the Wells Fargo Center. His most lauded contribution was his effort to clean up the St. Johns River, toward which he implemented sewage treatment and other environmental regulations. Tanzler was reelected in 1971, after defeating former Jacksonville mayor and Florida governor W. Haydon Burns, a "black hat" anti-consolidation activist, in the Democratic primary, and then easily winning the general election. He was reelected a second time in 1975, defeating Republican Don Trednick in the general election.

In 1976, Tanzler served as president of the National League of Cities.

In 1978 Tanzler announced his candidacy for Governor of Florida. He placed third in a seven-way Democratic primary eventually won by Bob Graham. The run required him to step down as mayor as of January 2, 1979; Jacksonville City Council President Jake Godbold was appointed to succeed him.

== Personal ==
Tanzler divorced his first wife, Ann Lyerly Tanzler, mother of their son Hans Gearhart Tanzler III, and in 1973 married the former LaMercedes Hutchins Woodard. The blended family included Tanzler's son and Woodard's two children from her former marriage to an Air Force test pilot.

Hans Tanzler died on July 25, 2013, at age 86.

== See also ==
- Florida Gators
- List of Levin College of Law graduates
- List of University of Florida alumni
- List of University of Florida Athletic Hall of Fame members

Political offices
Preceded by Lou Ritter	Mayor of Jacksonville (Pre-Consolidation); 1967–1968	Succeeded by Himself as mayor of consolidated Jacksonville
Preceded by Himself as mayor of pre-consolidation Jacksonville	Mayor of Jacksonville (Consolidated City); 1968–1979	Succeeded by Jake Godbold
