= City Hall Annex (Jacksonville, Florida) =

Building in Jacksonville, Florida

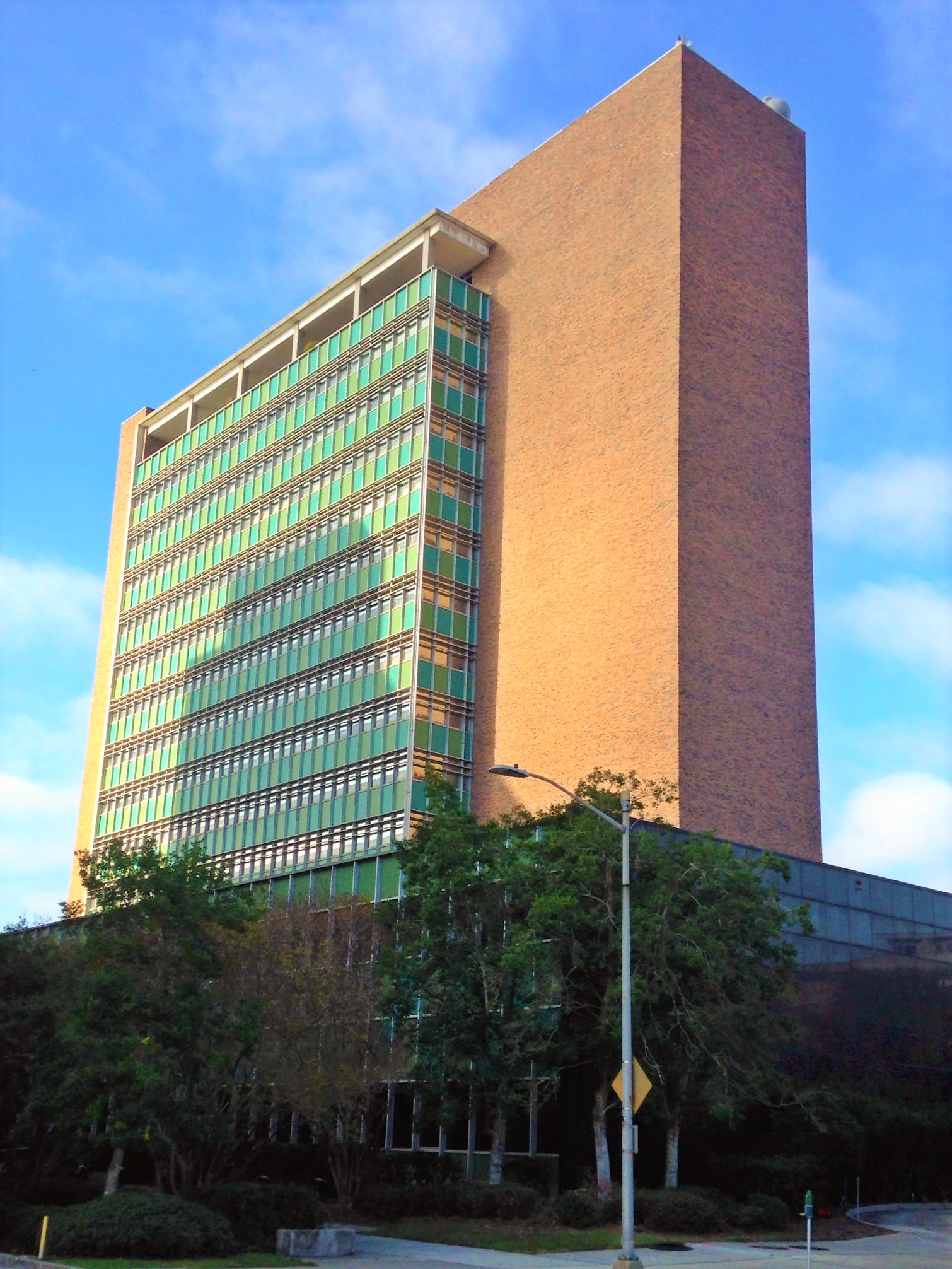

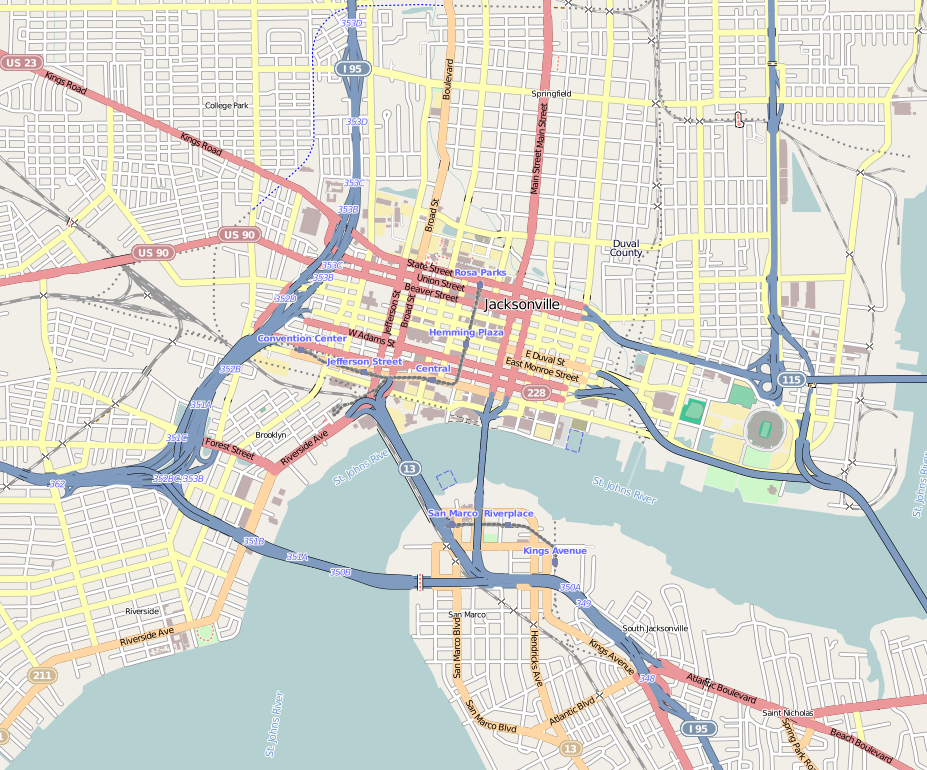
- Location within Central Jacksonville Location within Florida
- Former names: City Hall; Courthouse Annex

General information
- Type: Civic office
- Location: 220 East Bay Street; Jacksonville, Florida
- Coordinates: 30.32506°N 81.65503°W
- Completed: 1960
- Closed: 2017
- Demolished: January 20, 2019
- Owner: City of Jacksonville

Height
- Roof: 210.00 ft (64.01 m)

Technical details
- Floor count: 15
- Floor area: 210,396 sq ft (19,546.4 m^{2})

Design and construction
- Architect: Reynolds, Smith & Hills

The City Hall Annex was a 210 ft (64 m) high-rise in Jacksonville, Florida, located in the Northbank area of downtown.

== History ==
Completed in 1960 as City Hall, the building's design was symbolic of the city's accession to modernity. It was designed by the architecture firm Reynolds, Smith & Hills. Until its implosion in 2019, the building served as a prime example of Mid-century modern architecture. The building served as Jacksonville's city hall from its opening until the late 1990s, when the city renovated the St. James Building to become its new city hall. Following the relocation of city hall, the building became an annex for other city departments. The building closed permanently in 2017, with the city planning to demolish it to make room for a new convention center project that was later scrapped. The building was demolished in early 2019, along with the adjacent former county courthouse building. The property it sat on is currently being marketed for development.

== Gallery ==
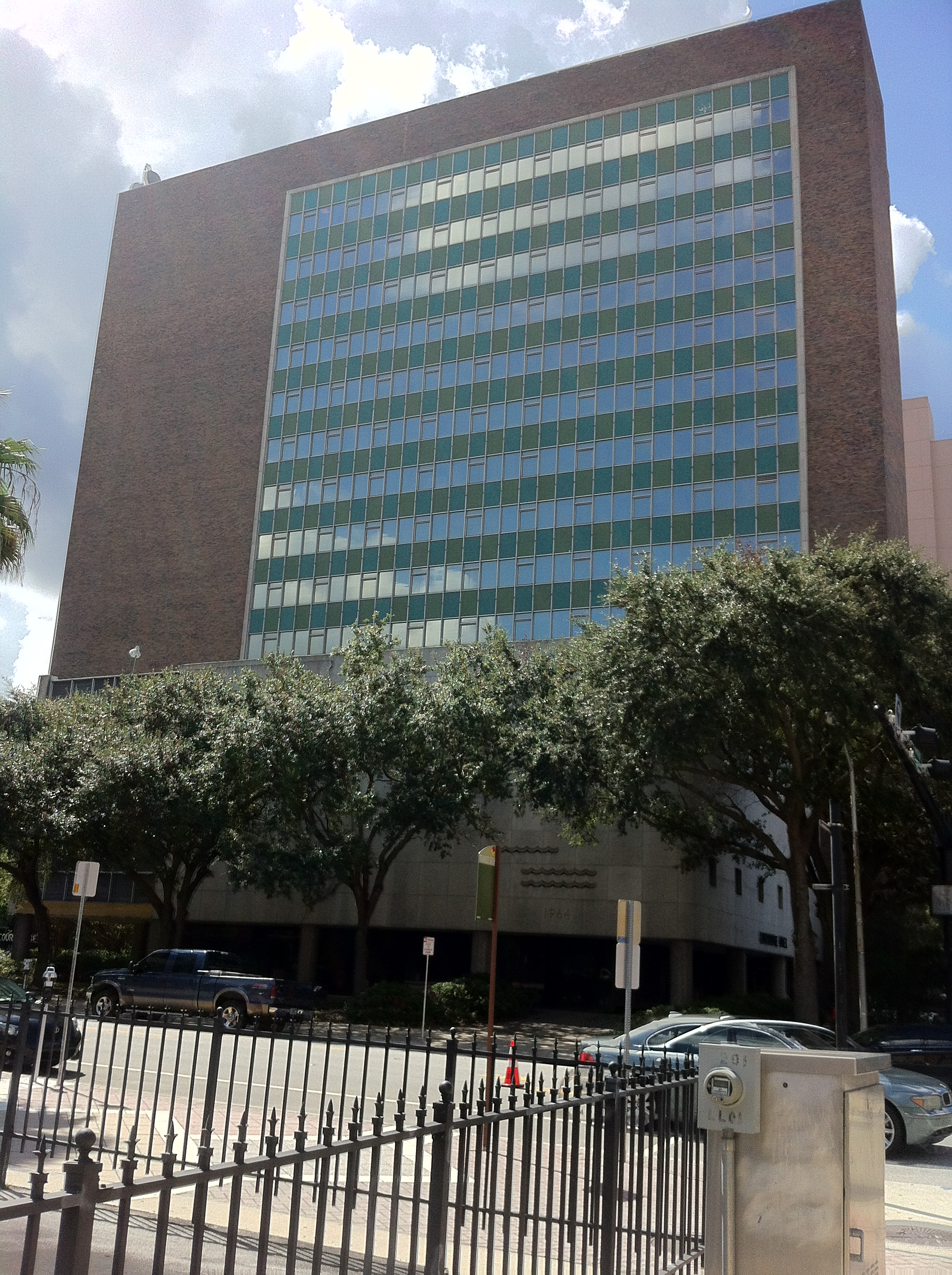

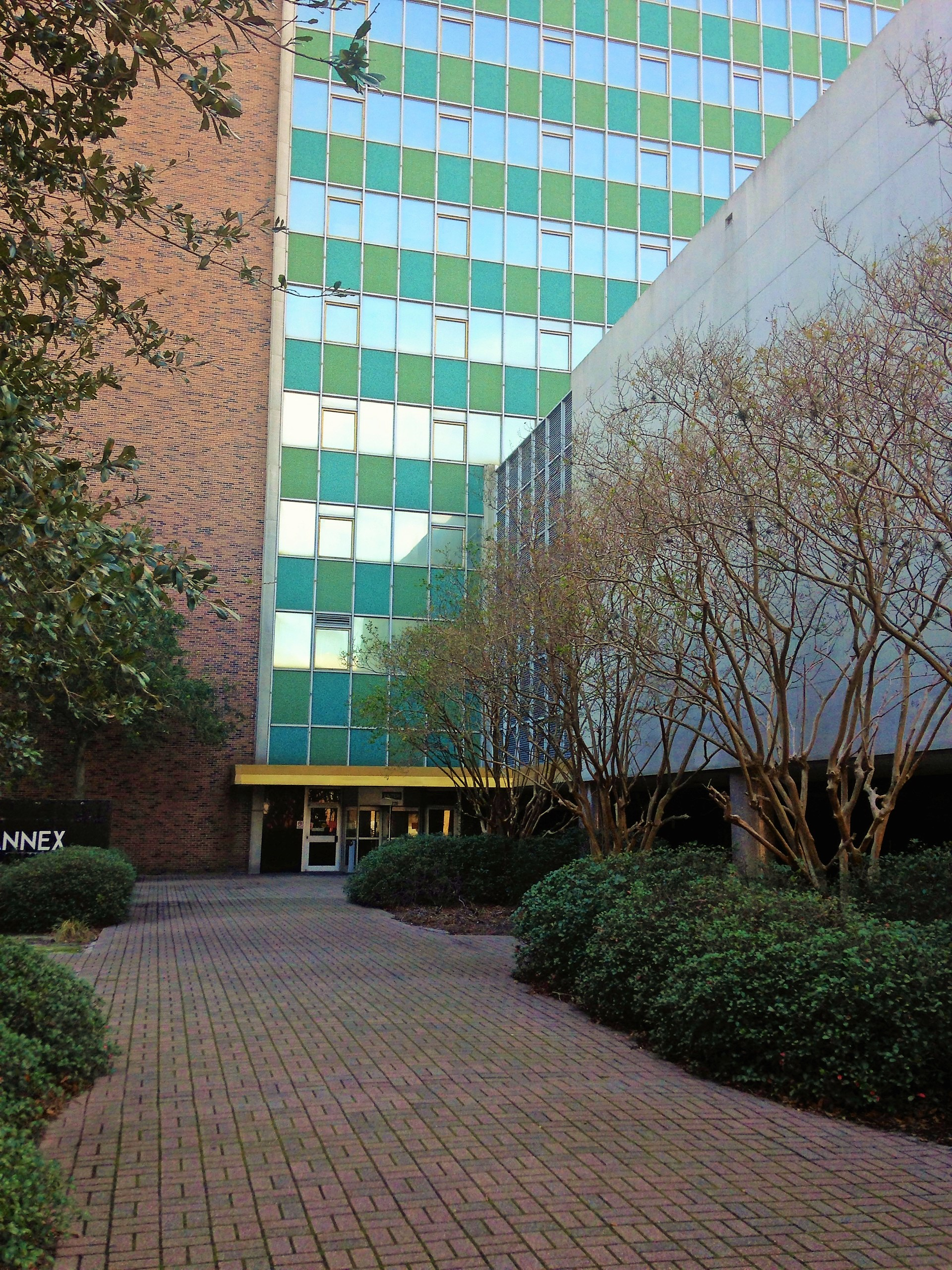

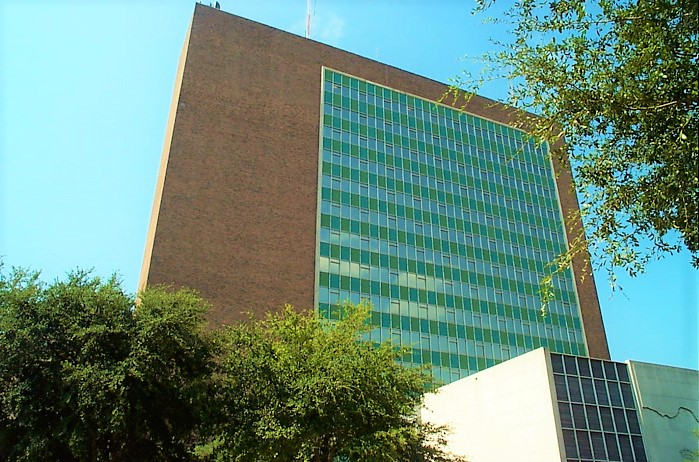

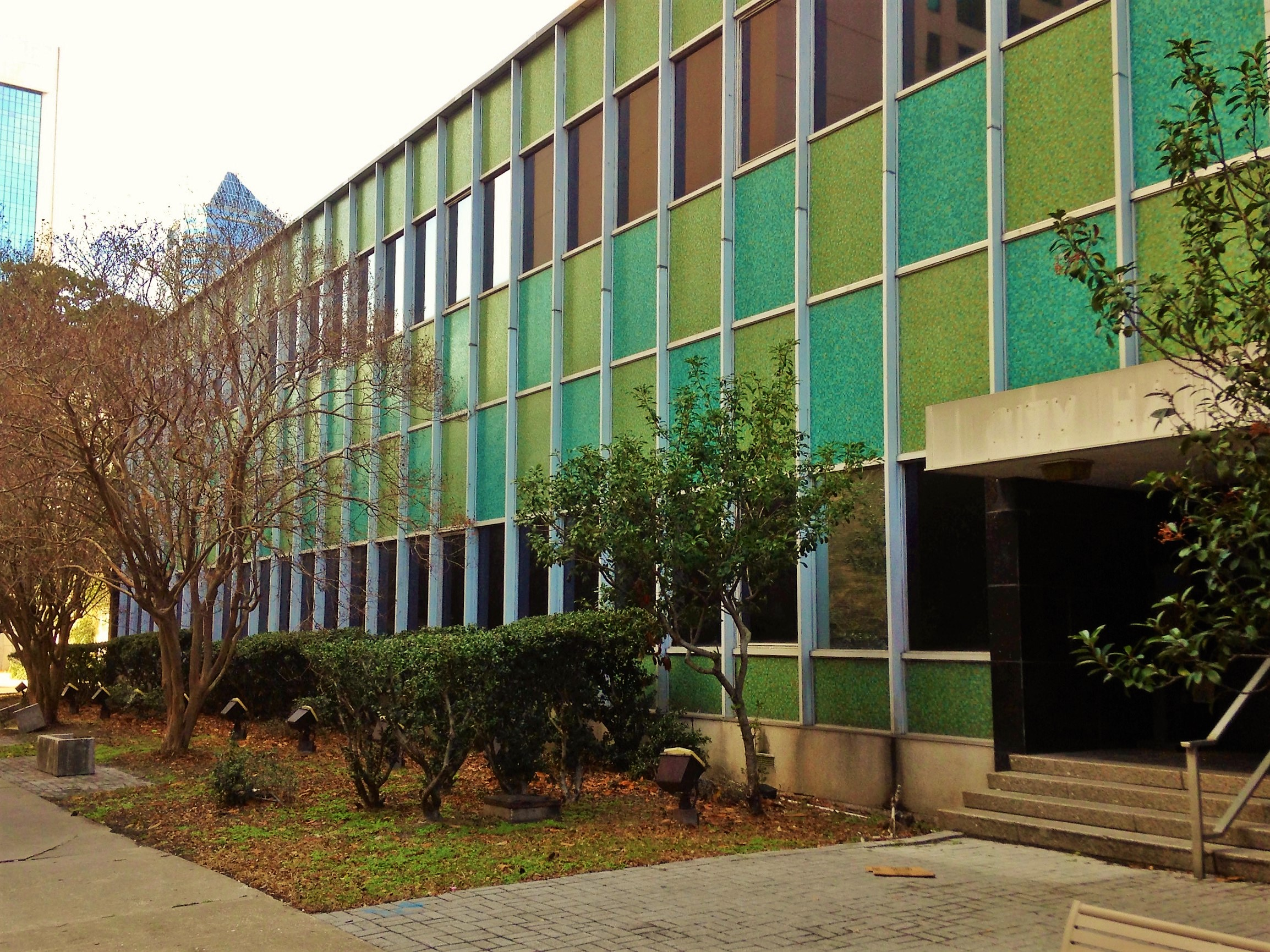

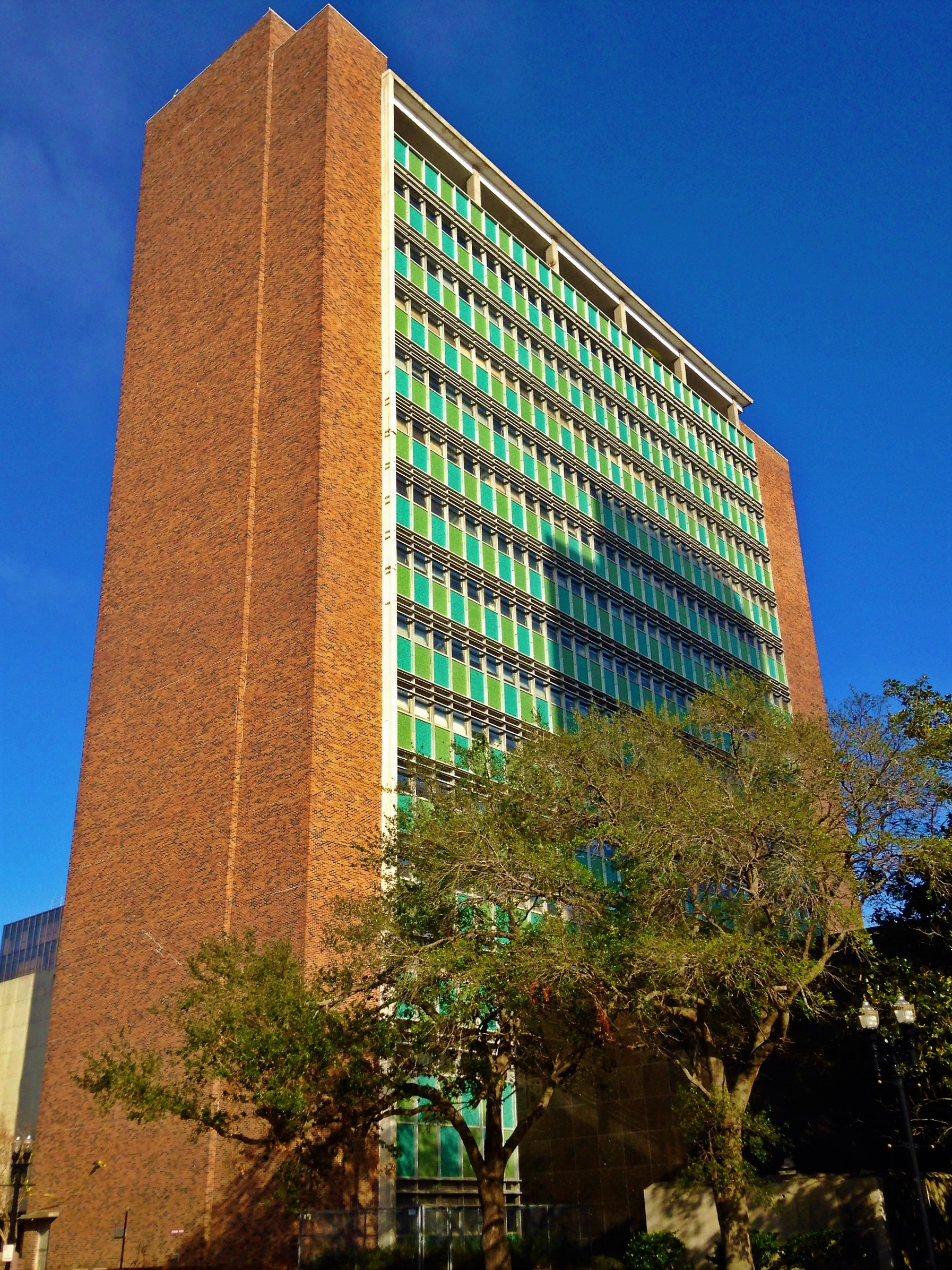

== See also ==
- Architecture of Jacksonville
- Downtown Jacksonville
