= Mike Weinstein =

American politician

Michael Weinstein
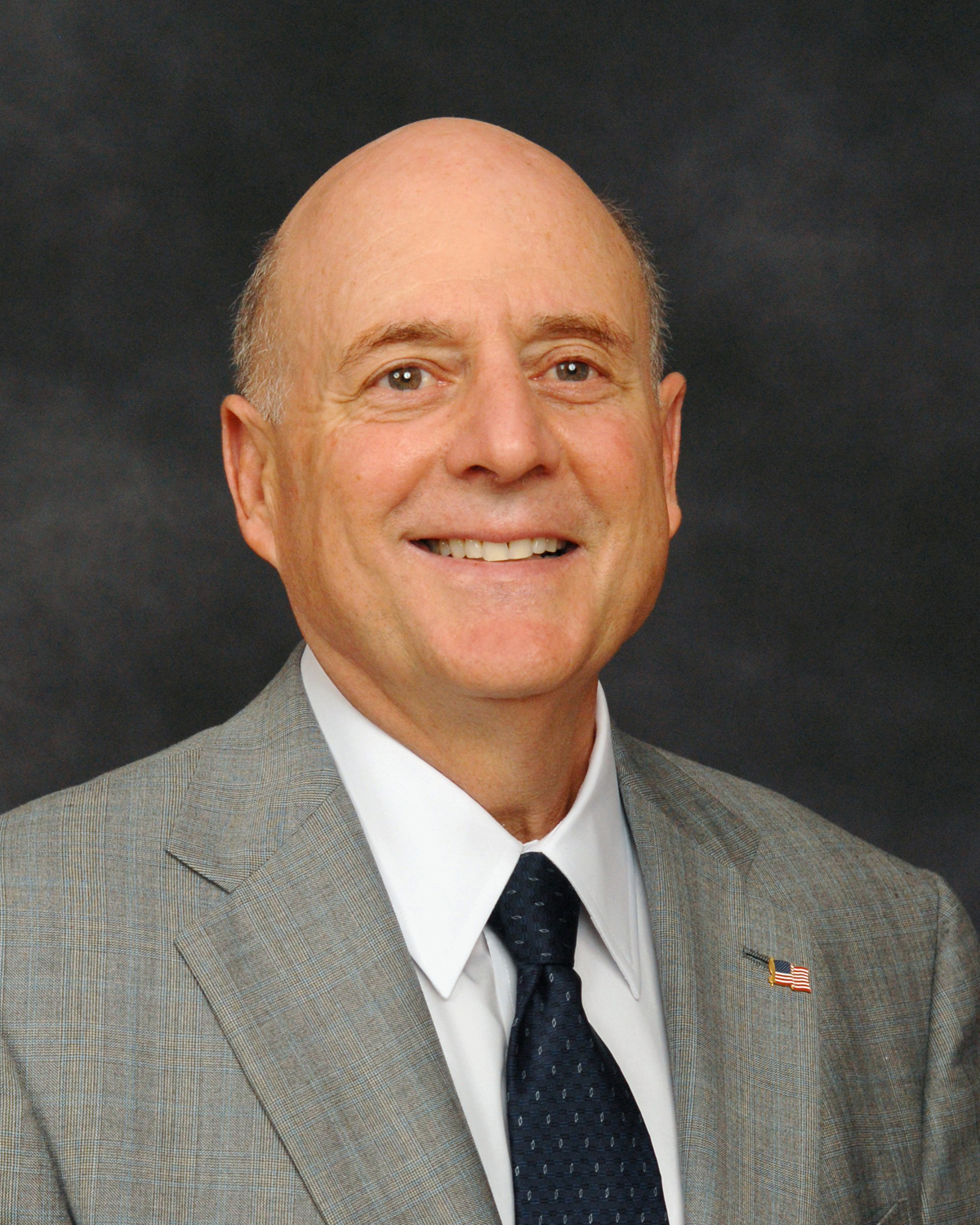

Member of the Florida House of Representatives from the 19th district
- In office 2008–2012
- Preceded by: Dick Kravitz

Personal details
- Born: February 6, 1949 (age 77)
- Party: Republican
- Spouse: Sara Weinstein

Michael B. Weinstein (born February 6, 1949) is an American politician who was a two-term member of the Florida House of Representatives, representing District 19, which encompasses parts of Jacksonville and surrounding areas.

== Life ==
Weinstein was born in Livingston, New Jersey. He relocated to Florida in 1975. He earned his bachelor's degree from Hartwick College, a M.S. from California State University, Long Beach, and a Juris Doctor degree from the University of Florida. He later served as a prosecutor in the State Attorney's Office. He currently resides in Jacksonville, Florida with his family.

Prior to being elected, Weinstein served as the CEO of the team responsible for Jacksonville's successful bid for Super Bowl XXXIX.

== Political career ==
Weinstein, who had served as the City of Jacksonville's chief financial officer under two mayors, was an unsuccessful candidate for Mayor of Jacksonville in 2003. In 2008, Weinstein was elected Representative for Florida's District 19, covering Clay, Duval, and St. John's counties, in the 2008 elections. He served as House Deputy Majority Whip from August 24, 2009 to 2010, and was reelected in the 2010 elections.

He received national attention from a music video (produced by his son Scott, under the stage name Scott Leigh) - "The Weinstein Slide" - released by his campaign promoting his 2010 re-election.

In 2012 Weinstein sought election in the Florida Senate for District 4, again accompanied by another Scott Leigh video, "The Weinstein Slide II" (which discusses the general mudslinging that accompanies many campaigns, and samples the original video music). Weinstein was defeated in the 2012 Republican primary by Aaron Bean by a 64%=36% vote.

Weinstein returned to serving as the City of Jacksonville's Chief Financial Officer for 2015–18, before retiring in September 2018.
