= Jacksonville Consolidation =

1968 city-county consolidation

The Jacksonville Consolidation was the city-county consolidation of the governments of the City of Jacksonville and Duval County, Florida. It was effected on October 1, 1968.

== Background ==
In 1934, the Florida Constitution was amended to give the Florida Legislature the “power to establish, alter or abolish, a Municipal corporation to be known as the City of Jacksonville, extending territorially throughout the present limits of Duval County," but for many years thereafter, the Legislature did not exercise the power.

Through the 1960s, Jacksonville, like many other large cities in the US, suffered from the effects of urban sprawl, with the city losing tax base to new residential and business development in the suburbs, which also drew out jobs.

Both the city and county suffered corruption scandals, following virtual one-party rule by Democrats since the turn of the 20th century, when the state legislature had disenfranchised most African Americans and effectively hollowed out the Republican Party, with which most blacks had been allied since they were granted the franchise as freedmen following the Civil War.

In the 1960s, a grand jury indicted 11 Jacksonville and Duval County officials on 142 counts of bribery and larceny including:

- 4 of 9 city councilmen
- 2 of 5 city commissioners
- the city auditor
- executive secretary of city recreation department
- 1 of 5 county commissioners
- the county purchasing agent

The city tax assessor took the Fifth Amendment, refused to testify, and resigned.

== Yates Manifesto ==
Claude Yates had recently retired as vice president and general manager of Southern Bell in Jacksonville and been named president of the Jacksonville Chamber of Commerce in 1964 when all 15 public high schools lost their accreditation; they were still segregated despite the 1954 Brown v. Board of Education ruling by the US Supreme Court. That year Congress had passed the Civil Rights Act that ended legal racial segregation of public facilities, and the state was working to adapt to other changes.

On January 19, 1965 Yates called a lunch meeting of the chamber at the Robert Meyer Hotel to decide on a course of action for the region. Attendees included Glenn Marshall Jr., Roger L. Main, W. S. Johnson, Charles W. Campbell, Gert H.W. Schmidt, Edward Ball, C. G. Whittaker, Luke Sadler, B. D. Fincannon, George B. Hills, Jacob F. Bryan III, B. N. Nimnicht, James R. Stockton Sr., J. T. Lane, J. H. Coppedge, Gen. Maxwell Snyder, Harold Meyerheim, Joseph W. Davin, Thompson S. Baker, Richard Lewinson, Henry M. French and S. Kendrick Guernsey.

The date was significant as it was the deadline for submitting requests for the upcoming state legislative session. At the time, the legislature met for only 60 days every other year. These business and civic leaders signed a 45-word petition to the Duval County legislative delegation, consisting of State Senator John E. Mathews and Representative Fred Schultz, that would later be dubbed as the "Yates Manifesto". It stated:

We, the undersigned, respectfully request the Duval County Delegation to the Florida Legislature to prepare an enabling act calling for the citizens of Duval County to vote on the consolidation of government within Duval to secure more efficient and effective government under one governmental body.

Under the Florida Constitution as it existed at that time, cities and counties had limited home rule powers and often needed special legislation by the Florida Legislature to accomplish many objectives. The Legislature generally deferred to the decision of the county delegation on whether to enact such special legislation, which gave the county delegation in a particular county great political influence. Following the adoption of a new Constitution, effective January 7, 1969, home rule powers of cities and counties were expanded, and the influence of the county delegation declined.

== Commission established ==
In response, the 1965 Florida Legislature created the Local Government Study Commission (LGSC). The legislature chose J. J. Daniel as chairman to design a new government and write its charter. Daniel was known, according to The Florida Times, for his "powerful personality, unquestioned integrity, strong leadership and history of civic involvement." Lex Hester was hired as the executive director of the LGSC. He was the "key architect of Jacksonville's consolidated government", transition coordinator and chief administrative officer following consolidation. Claude Yates was among the 50 business and civic leaders invited to participate; elected officials and government employees were intentionally excluded. On October 1, 1965 the commission was established and given until May 1, 1967 to complete their work. In January, 1967, after 15 months of effort and three months ahead of schedule, the LGSC submitted a consolidation proposal entitled, Blueprint for Improvement. The legislative delegation altered the plan slightly to make it more appealing and ordered it to be placed on a referendum in 1967.

== Plan promotion ==
Claude Yates also helped promote the government merger plan. Yates led the Citizens for Better Government committee, which successfully disseminated information about the advantages of consolidation to voters who had consistently defeated consolidation referendums since 1935. Lower taxes, increased economic development, unification of the community, better public spending and effective administration by a more central authority were all cited as reasons for a new consolidated government.

Influential individuals who supported consolidation included:

- Earl M. Johnson, a lawyer, served as secretary of the LGSC. He was the first black member of the Jacksonville Bar Association, and had worked with Thurgood Marshall and Constance Baker Motley to sue the School Board on behalf of the NAACP in 1960, seeking integration of schools and better funding for improvement.
- Sallye B. Mathis, a retired teacher, dean, and civic activist, was "one of two black women elected to the old City Council in 1967", along with Mary L. Singleton, the first women and the first blacks in 60 years to be elected to the Council. She supported the consolidation as more efficient. She was also elected to the new City Council, where she served for 15 years.
- W. E. "Ted" Grissett was vice chairman of the LGSC. He was elected as the first City Council president under consolidation.
- Mary L. Singleton was a teacher and restaurant owner who was elected to the old City Council in 1967, the same year as Sallye B. Mathis. Singleton was initially opposed to consolidation, but changed her mind and was influential among the black community. She was elected without opposition to the new consolidated City Council, where she served for two terms. In 1972 she was "the first black and the first woman to be elected to the Florida Legislature from North Florida since Reconstruction." She was the third black in the state elected to the legislature in the 20th century. She later held statewide appointed positions, and died at age 54 in 1980.
- Gert H.W. Schmidt was a German-born immigrant and Jacksonville business executive on the executive committee of the Local Government Study Commission. He also served on the Florida Board of Regents and was board chairman of the Jacksonville branch of the Federal Reserve Bank of Atlanta.

== Results ==
Duval county voters approved the consolidation referendum 54,493 - 29,768 on August 8, 1967 but the old government did not go quietly. A lawsuit was filed by a few elected officials contesting consolidation because their term in office would be shortened and they would be required to face re-election after one year in office. Other elected officials attempted to pass zoning changes or sign long-term government contracts for their friends.

After a year of transition, the consolidated government went into effect on October 1, 1968. Jacksonville celebrated with a parade and fireworks that attracted 200,000 spectators. Hans Tanzler, elected mayor of Jacksonville the year before, became the first mayor of the consolidated government. Jacksonville became the largest city (by population) in Florida and the 13th largest in the United States. According to the Jacksonville Historical Society, the city "became the largest city in land area in the entire world", a distinction it eventually yielded to Juneau, Alaska.

All land in Duval County is considered part of Jacksonville except the four independent municipalities of Jacksonville Beach, Atlantic Beach, Neptune Beach and Baldwin. Residents of these towns vote in city elections and are eligible for other services. Jacksonville was the second consolidated government in the state of Florida and one of ten in the nation.

== See also ==
- Timeline of Jacksonville, Florida
