= Jake Godbold =

American politician (1933–2020)

- Jake Godbold on the southbank of the St. Johns River in downtown Jacksonville

2nd Mayor of Consolidated Jacksonville
- In office July 2, 1979 – July 1, 1987; Acting: January 2, 1979 – July 2, 1979
- Preceded by: Hans Tanzler
- Succeeded by: Tommy Hazouri

Personal details
- Born: March 14, 1933 Jacksonville, Florida, U.S.
- Died: January 23, 2020 (aged 86) Jacksonville, Florida, U.S.
- Party: Democratic

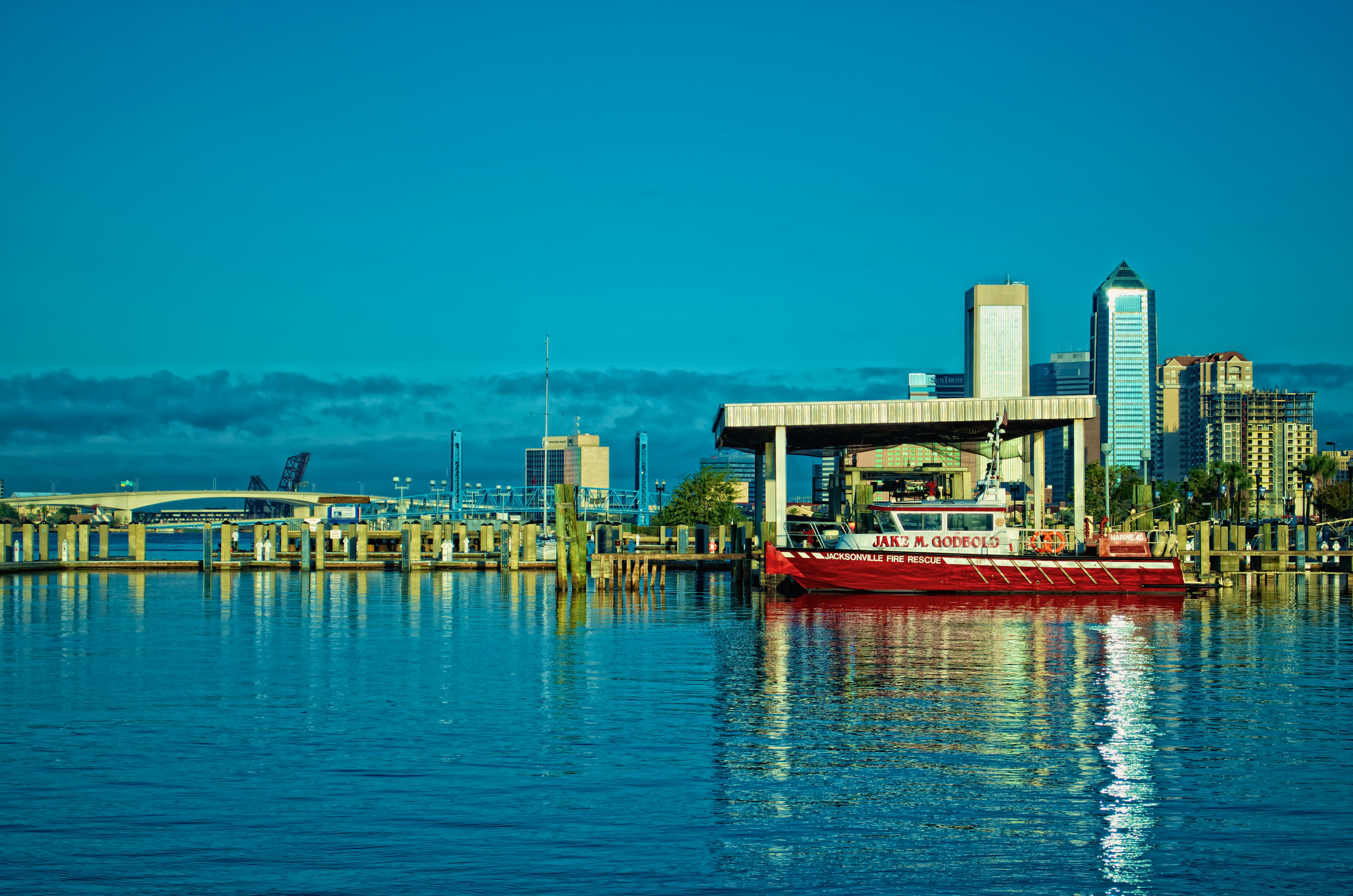
The fireboat Jake M. Godbold moored on the St Johns River in Jacksonville.

Jake Maurice Godbold (March 14, 1933 – January 23, 2020) was an American politician who served as mayor of Jacksonville, Florida from 1978 to 1987.

Godbold was elected to the Jacksonville city council in 1967 and served until 1979; he served two years as city council president from 1972 to 1973 and again from 1978 to 1979. When mayor Hans Tanzler announced he would be resigning his position to run for governor of Florida in 1978, Godbold was appointed to take his place for the last six months of the term. He was elected in 1979 and re-elected in 1983. During his time as mayor Godbold initiated a number of "brick and mortar" projects to revitalize the city's failing downtown. He initiated the efforts to secure an NFL team, started the Jacksonville Jazz Festival, initiated the construction of the Jacksonville Landing and the Southbank Riverwalk, and secured funds for public housing that had been taken away by the federal government. His "creative" use of bond financing meant eight years of capital construction projects by the city.

He ran for mayor again in 1995 and ultimately lost to John Delaney, the city's first Republican mayor since 1888. After leaving politics, he became involved with local charities, including Hubbard House.

Godbold died on January 23, 2020. And is buried at Evergreen Cemetery.

Political offices
Preceded by Hans Tanzler	Mayor of Jacksonville; 1979–1987	Succeeded by Tommy Hazouri
