= Jacksonville City Council =

Legislative governing body in Florida, US

Type
- Type: Unicameral

Leadership
- Council President: Nick Howland, R-At Large since July 1, 2026
- Council Vice President: Joe Carlucci, R-District 5 since July 1, 2026

Structure
- Seats: 19
- Political groups: Majority (14); Republican (14): Minority (5); Democratic (5)

Elections
- Voting system: First-past-the-post
- Last election: 2025

Meeting place
- Jacksonville City Hall

Website
- www.jacksonville.gov/city-council

The Jacksonville City Council is the legislative governing body of the city of Jacksonville, Florida and of Duval County, with which the City of Jacksonville consolidated in 1968. The council meets in its chambers at Jacksonville City Hall, 117 W. Duval St. Under Florida's government transparency laws, all official council business must be conducted in meetings open to the public.

== Composition ==
The Jacksonville City Council is composed of nineteen members who are elected for a four-year term and serve as part-time legislators. In May of each year, the Council elects a President and Vice President to serve one-year terms beginning the first of July. The current president is Nick Howland ((R) At-Large, Group 3)

The nineteen members are not all elected in the same manner; some are elected from districts, and others are elected at large. However, once elected, there is no distinction between council members elected at-large and from regular districts. Both have equal rights and responsibilities.

=== Regular districts ===
Duval County is divided into 14 districts; each of these districts elects a single council member who resides in the district. Like virtually all legislative districts at all levels in United States, these districts are redrawn every ten years following the decennial census.

=== At-large groups ===
In the early 1990s, voters approved an unusual residency requirement for "at-large" members. The county was divided into five special districts unrelated to any other districts, solely for the purpose of providing better representation for all geographical areas of Jacksonville. This was done because a trend had developed in which all five "at large" councilmembers actually resided in one small area of town. So under the current structure, at-large council members must reside in the special district for which they are running, but are elected by the voters of the county as a whole.

One at-large seat was vacated in 2007 because of a violation of this residency requirement; "Jay" Jabour was elected as the at-large councilman from the 2nd special district, but evidence later arose indicating that he actually lived in the 3rd special district. A judge subsequently invalidated the election, and the seat became vacant.

=== Party affiliation ===
Currently the council has five Democrats and fourteen Republicans serving. This makes Jacksonville the most populous city in the United States with a majority Republican council.

== Committees ==
The Council President assigns members to committees and to act as council liaisons.

There are five standing committees:

1. Finance
2. Land Use & Zoning
3. Rules
4. Transportation, Energy & Utilities
5. Neighborhoods, Community Services, Public Health & Safety

There are two administrative committees:

1. Personnel Committee
2. Executive Committee

There are three council boards & commissions:

1. Duval County Tourist Development Council
2. Jacksonville Waterways Commission
3. Value Adjustment Board

== Awards and criticism ==
The Charles D. Webb Award is given annually by outgoing council President for the most effective councilman, i.e. most helpful to the council and constituents. After the 1988 death of Claude Yates, known as the father of Jacksonville's consolidation, the Jacksonville City Council created the Claude J. Yates Outstanding Councilman of the Year Award, which is bestowed annually to an exemplary council member. The council created the John E. Goode Award for best council debater in 1997. The Mary L. Singleton Award is given to the member with the most difficult committee assignment during the year.

In late 2007, a Grand Jury announced that it would probe alleged Sunshine Law violations by the Jacksonville City Council. While the Grand Jury found numerous instances of violation of the law, they decided against issuing any indictments when they issued their final report in January 2008.

In January 2010, District 13 Council member John Meserve was suspended by Florida Governor Charlie Crist after being charged with conducting real estate transactions without a license. Art Graham, who resigned the seat in 2009 to unsuccessfully run for state senate, was appointed by the governor on February 12, 2010 to replace John Meserve, who is fighting a felony charge. In May 2018, two Council members, Reggie Brown and Katrina Brown, were indicted by a federal grand jury on conspiracy to commit mail and wire fraud.

== Controversies ==
In December 2022, community and civil rights activist Benjamin Frazier was arrested during the public comment portion of that week's city council meeting. Frazier, who was 72 years old and using a motorized scooter at the time of the arrest, was brought to the ground by Jacksonville Sheriff's Office officers and charged with misdemeanor trespassing and resisting arrest without violence after he continued to speak during public comment after his allowed time had ended.

In May 2025, three community members affiliated with the Jacksonville Palestine Solidarity Network and Jacksonville Community Action Committee were arrested during a city council meeting while protesting city council policies regarding the investment of taxpayer money in Israeli bonds and the Jacksonville City Council's passage of a resolution in October 2023 expressing support for Israel. Two of the community members were flipped over a row of seats by JSO Officer Maykel Aliaga-Ruiz before being taken into custody. All three were released on bail following community backlash.

== City Council members ==
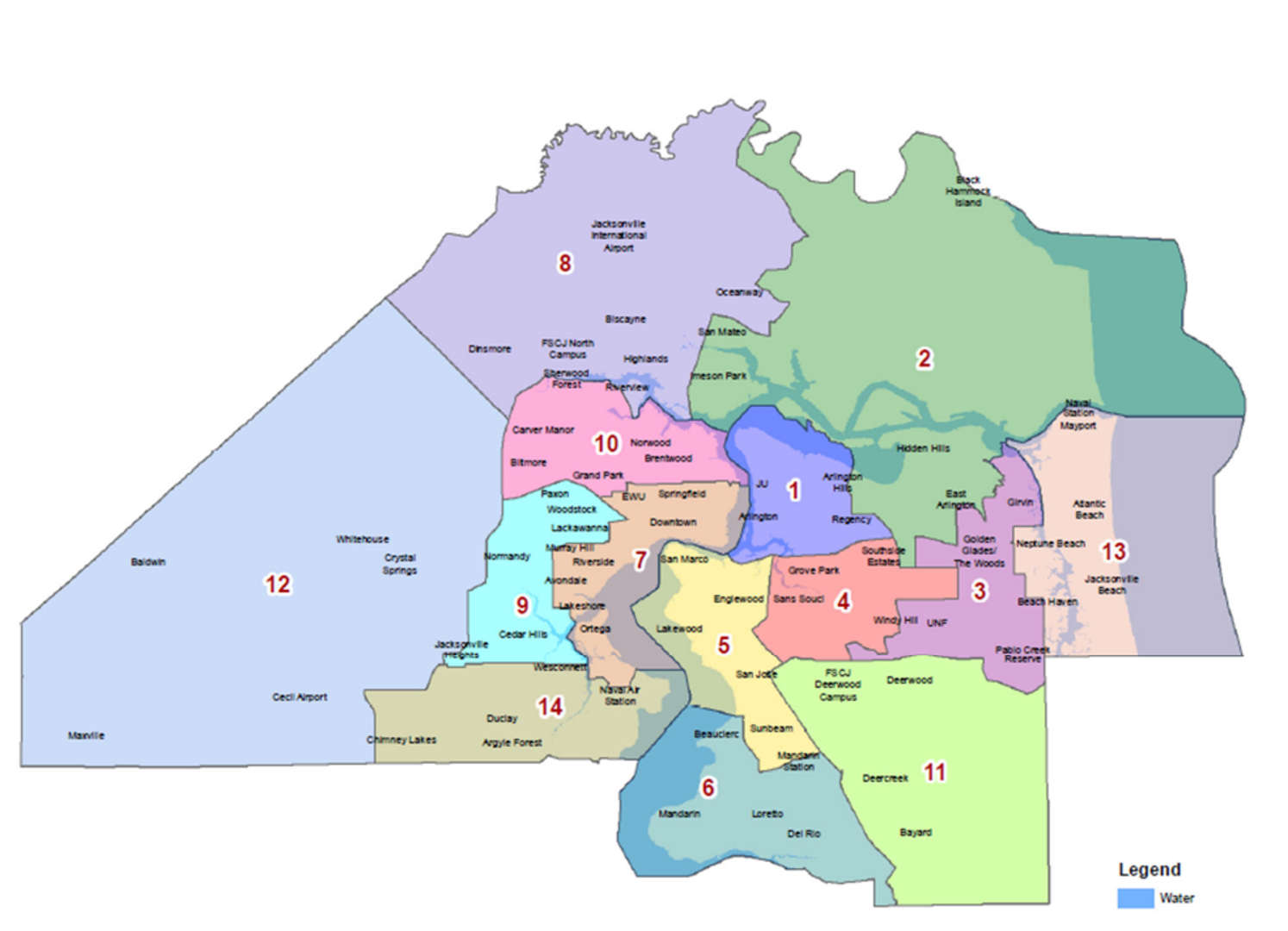
Jacksonville City Council Map

District	Name	Party
1	Ken Amaro	Rep
2	Mike Gay	Rep
3	Will Lahnen	Rep
4	Kevin Carrico	Rep
5	Joe Carlucci	Rep
6	Michael Boylan	Rep
7	Jimmy Peluso	Dem
8	Reggie Gaffney, Jr	Dem
9	Tyrona Clark-Murray	Dem
10	Ju'Coby Pittman	Dem
11	Raul Arias	Rep
12	Randy White	Rep
13	Rory Diamond	Rep
14	Rahman Johnson	Dem
At-large
Seat 1	Moné Holder	Dem
Seat 2	Ronald B. Salem	Rep
Seat 3	Nick Howland	Rep
Seat 4	Matt Carlucci	Rep
Seat 5	Chris Miller	Rep
