= Government of Jacksonville =

The government of Jacksonville is organized under the city charter and provides for a "strong" mayor–council system. The most notable feature of the government in Jacksonville, Florida, is that it is consolidated with Duval County, which the jurisdictions agreed to in the 1968 Jacksonville Consolidation.

The Mayor of Jacksonville is elected to four-year terms and serves as the head of the government's executive branch. The Jacksonville City Council comprises nineteen members, fourteen representing single-member electoral districts of roughly equal population, and five elected for at-large seats from super districts. The mayor oversees most city departments, though some are independent or quasi-independent. Law enforcement is provided by the Jacksonville Sheriff's Office, headed by an elected sheriff, public schools are overseen by Duval County Public Schools, and several services are provided by largely independent authorities.

== Administrative structure ==
The most noteworthy feature of Jacksonville's government is its consolidated nature. The 1968 Duval County-Jacksonville consolidation eliminated any type of separate county executive or legislature, and supplanted these positions with the Mayor of Jacksonville and the City Council of the City of Jacksonville, respectively. Because of this, voters who live outside of the city limits of Jacksonville, but inside Duval County, vote for candidates for these positions and may run for them. In 1995, John Delaney, a resident of Neptune Beach, was elected as mayor of the City of Jacksonville.

In 1968, residents of the small municipalities of Baldwin, Neptune Beach, Atlantic Beach and Jacksonville Beach voted against joining the consolidated government. The four separate communities, which comprise 6% of the total county population, provide their own municipal services, while maintaining the right to contract with the consolidated government to provide services. In December 2005, the city council of Baldwin in the far western portion of Duval County, voted to eliminate their police department. In March 2006, the Jacksonville Sheriff's Office assumed policing responsibilities for the one-square-mile town.

== Executive ==
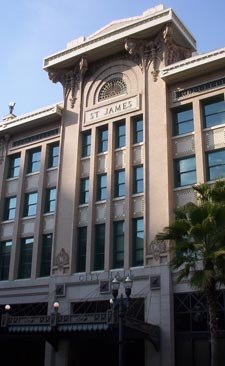
The St. James Building, the seat of city government in Jacksonville.

=== Mayor ===
Jacksonville uses the Mayor-Council form of city government, also called the Strong-Mayor form, in which a mayor serves as the city's Chief Executive and Administrative officer. The mayor holds veto power over all resolutions and ordinances passed by the city council. This position also has the power to hire and fire the head of various city departments. The current mayor is Donna Deegan. She began her first term on July 1, 2023.

Jacksonville Constitutional Officers
Office	Name	Party	Term ends
Mayor	Donna Deegan	Democrat	2027
Sheriff	T.K. Waters	Republican	2027
Property Appraiser	Joyce Morgan	Democrat	2027
Tax Collector	Jim Overton	Republican	2027
Supervisor of Elections	Jerry Holland	Republican	2027
Clerk of the Circuit & County Courts	Jody Phillips	Republican	2025
State Attorney	Melissa Nelson	Republican	2025
Public Defender	Charlie Cofer	Republican	2025

=== Law enforcement ===
Jacksonville and Duval County historically maintained separate police agencies: the Jacksonville Police Department and Duval County Sheriff's Office. As part of consolidation in 1968, the two merged, creating the Jacksonville Sheriff's Office (JSO). The JSO is headed by the elected Sheriff of Duval County, currently T. K. Waters, and is responsible for law enforcement and corrections in the county.

=== Firefighting and rescue ===
The Jacksonville Fire and Rescue Department (JFRD) is responsible for all fire protection and rescue service (ambulance) in Duval County with exceptions. Jacksonville Beach has its own department, while Atlantic Beach provides a fire station facility that is staffed and equipped by JFRD. Baldwin has a (mostly) volunteer fire department and Neptune Beach relies on Atlantic Beach for fire protection. The current JFRD Director/Fire Chief is Kurt Wilson. This position is appointed by the Mayor.

=== Autonomous agencies ===
Some government services remained - as they had been prior to consolidation – independent of both city and county authority. In accordance with Florida law, the Duval County School Board continues to exist with nearly complete autonomy. Jacksonville also has several quasi-independent government agencies which only nominally answer to the consolidated authority, including JEA, Jacksonville Port Authority, Jacksonville Transportation Authority, Jacksonville Housing Authority and Jacksonville Aviation Authority. The main environmental and agricultural body is the Duval County Soil and Water Conservation District, which works closely with other area and state agencies.

=== Office of General Counsel ===
The Office of the General Counsel (OGC), currently led by Jason R. Gabriel, includes 39 attorneys, making it one of the largest and most diverse law firms in Jacksonville. It operates like a private firm because "clients" are billed in detail for legal services provided. Clients include the public utility provider (JEA), the school district (Duval County Public Schools), Airport, Seaport, Transportation and Housing Authorities, constitutional officers (Mayor, Supervisor of Elections, Property Appraiser, Sheriff, Tax Collector and Clerk of Court), 10 departments, 19 City Council members, and 40+ boards, commissions, and agencies.

Due to this unusual client list, the General Counsel's website states that they offer support for areas that include commercial, personal injury, constitutional & civil rights litigation, real estate, land use, environmental law, labor and employment law, education law, workers' compensation, eminent domain, foreclosures, evictions, bankruptcy, torts, municipal finance, procurement, contract negotiation and drafting, as well as a variety of economic development and transactional areas.

The 1967 Charter that created Jacksonville's consolidated form of government included a provision for the Office of General Counsel. Under the Charter, the OGC represents all Jacksonville government entities. The office has developed the expertise to advise clients on municipal law and Jacksonville's Charter and consolidated form of government. The Charter also states that any legal opinion rendered by the General Counsel is binding on the entire consolidated government. Since 1968, General Counsels have issued over 370 binding legal opinions. In the early years of consolidation, legal opinions were critical to the successful establishment of Jacksonville's consolidated government and the elimination of litigation between entities.

== Legislative ==
=== City Council ===
The city council has nineteen members, fourteen of whom are elected from single-member districts where each member must reside in the district that they represent.

The other five members are elected under a unique hybrid district/at-large system. Prior to the early 1990s, these members were elected at-large, with no specific residency requirements. However, over time the five members were all elected from the same side of the city. In order to increase representation from other areas, voters approved a change in the city charter that divided the city into five "super-districts" (unrelated to the 14 single-member districts), with one at-large member to represent each district. These five members are elected at-large from these super districts.

District	Neighborhoods	Name	Party	Term ends	Position	Ref
1	Arlington and Regency	Ken Amaro	Republican	2027		
2	East Arlington (west-half), Blount Island and the northeastern outskirts	Mike Gay	Republican	2027	Vice Chair, Jacksonville Waterways Commission	
3	Girven, Golden Glades, Beach Haven, Intracoastal Waterway	Will Lahnen	Republican	2027		
4	Southside (north of 202/J. T. Butler Blvd)	Kevin Carrico	Republican	2027	Chair, Land Use & Zoning	
5	San Marco, San Jose and St. Nicolas	Joe Carlucci	Republican	2027		
6	Mandarin and Julington Creek	Michael Boylan	Republican	2027	Chair, Neighborhoods, Community Services, Public Health & Safety Committee	
7	Urban Core, Garden City, Turtle Creek and the outskirts of Northside	Jimmy Peluso	Democratic	2027	Chair, Jacksonville Waterways Commission	
8	Moncrief Park, Lake Forest, Riverview, College Park, Copper Hill and northwestern outskirts	Reggie Gaffney	Democratic	2027	Vice Chair, Land Use & Zoning	
9	Mixon Town, Murray Hill, Confederate Park, western Ortega and western Duclay	Tyrona Clark-Murray	Democratic	2027		
10	Harborview, Magnolia Gardens, Hyde Park West Jacksonville and Normandy	Ju'Coby Pittman	Democratic	2027	Chair, Transportation, Energy & Utilities Committee	
11	Southside (south of 202/J. T. Butler Blvd)	Raul Arias	Republican	2027		
12	Cecil Field, Oakleaf and the outskirts of Westside	Randy White	Republican	2027	Council Vice President Vice Chair, Finance Committee Vice Chair, Rules Committee	
13	Mayport, Beachside	Rory Diamond	Republican	2027		
14	Argyle Forest, Duclay, Ortega, Yukon, Lakeshore, Avondale, Riverside, Fivepoints and NAS Jacksonville	Rahman Johnson	Democratic	2027		
At-Large
Group 1		Moné Holder	Democrat	2027		
Group 2		Ronald Salem	Republican	2027	Council President	
Group 3		Nick Howland	Republican	2027	Chair, Finance Committee	
Group 4		Matt Carluuci	Republican	2027		
Group 5		Chris Miller	Republican	2027		

=== Regional representatives ===
Federally, most of the city is split in the 4th district, represented by Republican Aaron Bean, and in the 5th district, represented by Republican John Rutherford. Jacksonville is represented in the State Senate by Clay Yarborough (R) and Tracie Davis (D) and in the State House by Wymann Duggan (R), Angela Nixon (D), Kimberly Daniels (D), Dean Black (R), Kiyan Michael (R), and Jessica Baker (R). Jacksonville, as well as the rest of the State of Florida, are served in the U.S. Senate by Rick Scott (R) and Marco Rubio (R); and by Governor Ron DeSantis (R).

== Judiciary ==
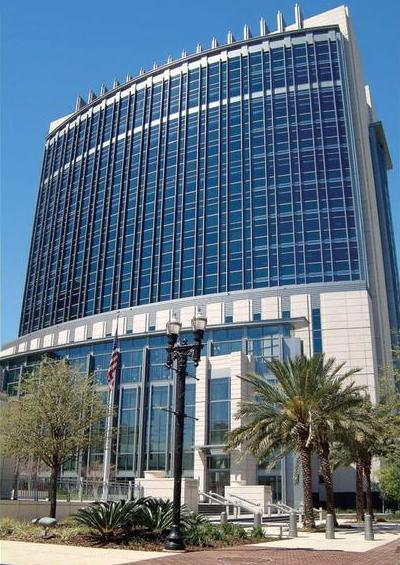
John Milton Bryan Simpson United States Courthouse

=== Federal court ===
Jacksonville is in the United States District Court for the Middle District of Florida. There are 15 authorized judgeships in the district who are appointed by the POTUS and confirmed by the Senate. Additionally, there are 7 judges with Senior status who are eligible to hear cases. Chief Judge of the District is Patricia C. Fawsett.

A new federal courthouse in Jacksonville was completed in late 2002 and opened in 2003 to replace the old facility, built in 1933. On February 8, 2005, the 492,000 sq ft (45,700 m^{2}) building at 300 North Hogan Street was named, the John Milton Bryan Simpson United States Courthouse.

=== State court ===
Jacksonville is in the 4th Judicial Circuit of Florida, which includes Duval, Clay and Nassau counties. Circuit Courts have jurisdiction over felonies, tax issues, real property, juvenile issues, probate, family law (dissolution of marriage, paternity and adoption) and determination of competence. There are 29 elected circuit judges for Duval county: (8) Civil, (1) Probate, (7) Family, (8) Criminal and (4) Juvenile. Mark Mahon is chief judge of the circuit.

The Jacksonville State Attorney's Office for the 4th Circuit has the responsibility for prosecuting persons charged with crimes. The position of State Attorney is an elected position and is held by Melissa Nelson (Republican), who was elected in 2016 on a platform of justice reform. She established a conviction integrity unit to review cases in which there were questions about convictions. On March 28, 2019, Clifford Williams and his nephew Nathan Myers were exonerated of charges of murder and attempted murder; their convictions were dismissed. Nelson's office had recommended this to the Duval County court after reviewing the case and finding severe weaknesses. The two men were released from prison after serving 42 years each. This was the first exoneration in Florida that was led by a prosecutor's office. Nelson's office has also worked on reforming juvenile justice, developing partnerships with the police in three counties to try to keep juveniles out of the justice system. The police have been given "far greater discretion to issue civil citations in lieu of criminal summons to eligible juveniles."

The Public Defender's Office has the responsibility for defending persons charged with crimes who are subject to incarceration and judged indigent. The position of Public Defender is an elected position and is held by Charlie Cofer.

=== County court ===
The city of Jacksonville is home to the Duval County Courthouse.

The previous courthouse was constructed in 1958, and the county's population has grown by more than 50% in the past forty years. A new $190 million Duval County Courthouse was a key component of the Better Jacksonville Plan, approved by voters in 2000. After ten years, the $350 million complex opened in 2012. County Courts primarily handle civil cases where the amount in controversy is less than $15,000, Small claims court, misdemeanors, violations of civil & municipal ordinances and traffic tickets. There are 17 elected county judges for Duval county.

== Politics ==
Starting in the 1980s, thousands of Republicans moved to Florida and Jacksonville from northern states or relocated from south Florida to avoid overcrowding, state income taxes, high prices and crime. They slowly ate away at the Democratic dominance at the local level. Even as the city became increasingly willing to support Republicans nationally, Democrats continued to dominate most local offices well into the 1990s. At the same time, many of the area's Democrats became increasingly willing to vote for Republicans for state and local offices after years of splitting their tickets at national elections. This culminated in 1992, when Tillie Fowler became the first Republican to represent a significant portion of Jacksonville in Congress since Reconstruction. Two years later, Republicans swept most of the city's seats in the state legislature, and incumbent Democratic mayor Ed Austin switched parties to become a Republican. In 1995, John Delaney became the city's first elected Republican mayor since 1887.

Republicans currently hold the majority on the city council but lost the Mayor's position in 2011, only to regain it in 2015 and lose it once again in 2023. They also hold five of the city's seven state house seats and two of the city's three state senate seats.

The city's geography and urban density plays a major role in the political makeup of Jacksonville. Based on the party affiliation of the city-councilmen and district representatives, the older and more urban areas including Northside, the Urban Core and parts of the Westside, favor Democrats. The newer, suburban and exurban areas including Southside, Riverside, the southern outskirts of Westside, The Beaches and Mayport favor Republicans.
