= Betty Holzendorf =

American politician (1939–2024)

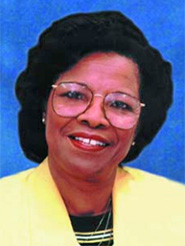

Member of the Florida Senate from the 2nd district
- In office November 3, 1992 – November 5, 2002
- Preceded by: Pat Thomas (redistricting)
- Succeeded by: Durell Peaden (redistricting)

Member of the Florida House of Representatives from the 16th district
- In office May 17, 1988 – November 3, 1992
- Preceded by: Don Gaffney
- Succeeded by: James B. Fuller (redistricting)

Personal details
- Born: April 5, 1939 Jacksonville, Florida
- Died: February 29, 2024 (aged 84) Jacksonville, Florida
- Party: Democratic
- Spouse: King Holzendorf Jr.
- Children: 4
- Education: Edward Waters College (B.A.); Atlanta University (M.A.); University of North Florida (M.Ed.)

Betty Smith Holzendorf (April 5, 1939 – February 29, 2024) was a Democratic politician from Florida who served as a member of the Florida House of Representatives from the 16th district from 1988 to 1992 and as a member of the Florida Senate from the 2nd district from 1992 to 2002.

== Life and career ==
Holzendorf was born in Jacksonville on April 5, 1939. She graduated from Edward Waters College and the University of North Florida, both in Jacksonville. She married King Holzendorf who served as a city councilman in Jacksonville.

In the 1960s she was an administrative aide to mayor Jake Godbold.

Holzendorf was defeated in 2003 in a race for the Mayor of Jacksonville. The Jacksonville Daily Record interviewed her during her mayoral campaign.

Holzendorf died on February 29, 2024, at the age of 84. Betty Holzendorf Drive In Jacksonville is named in her honor.
