= James B. Fuller =

American politician

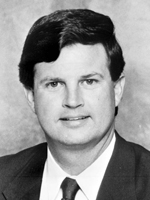

Duval County Clerk of Courts
- In office January 2, 2001 – January 8, 2013
- Preceded by: Henry W. Cook
- Succeeded by: Ronnie Fussell

Member of the Florida House of Representatives from the 16th district
- In office November 3, 1992 – November 7, 2000
- Preceded by: Betty Holzendorf (redistricting)
- Succeeded by: Mark Mahon

Personal details
- Born: October 10, 1949 (age 76) Orlando, Florida
- Party: Republican
- Children: Amy, Mandy
- Education: Troy State University (B.S., 1985)

Military service
- Allegiance: United States
- Branch/service: United States Navy
- Years of service: 1971–1990
- Awards: Presidential Unit Citation; Meritorious Unit Commendation; Good Conduct Medal

James B. Fuller is a Republican politician and U.S. Navy veteran who served as a member of the Florida House of Representatives from 1992 to 2000, and as Duval County Clerk of Courts from 2001 to 2013.

== Early life and career ==
Fuller was born in Orlando, Florida. He enlisted in the United States Navy in 1971 and served in the Vietnam War as a door gunner. Fuller was commissioned as an officer in 1978 and ultimately stationed at Naval Station Mayport, where he retired as a lieutenant commander in 1990.

== Florida House of Representatives ==
In 1992, Democratic State Representative Kathy Chinoy ran for re-election to a second term in the 16th District, which was based in southern Jacksonville. Fuller ran against her, and won the Republican primary with 68 percent of the vote. Though Chinoy was viewed as a rising star in the state legislature, Fuller narrowly defeated her, winning 53 percent of the vote to Chinoy's 47 percent.

Chinoy ran against Fuller again in 1994, but lost the rematch by a wider margin, with Fuller winning 55 percent of the vote. Fuller won re-election in 1996 with 60 percent of the vote against Democratic nominee John Merrett, and in 1998 unopposed.

Fuller was term-limited in 2000 and could not seek re-election to a fifth term in the State House. Though he was considered a possible candidate to succeed Republican Congresswoman Tillie Fowler in the 4th congressional district, he ultimately declined to run.

== Duval County Clerk of Courts ==
In 2000, Duval County Clerk Henry Cook ran for re-election to a third term, despite a two-term limit in the county charter, and sought to challenge the legality of the term limit. The circuit court agreed and set aside the term limit, but on appeal, the First District Court of Appeal reversed, and Cook was disqualified from the ballot. Fuller ran to succeed Cook, and defeated Democratic nominee Terry Wood in the general election with 54 percent of the vote. After Fuller was elected, the Florida Supreme Court reversed the District Court of Appeal's decision, and invalidated the two-term limit, but declined to overturn the election.

Fuller was re-elected unopposed in 2004, and in 2008, defeated Democratic nominee John Winkler to win re-election to a third term with 55 percent of the vote.

In 2012, the Florida Supreme Court reversed its previous decision, and allowed counties to impose term limits on county officers under their charters. Fuller nonetheless sought re-election, arguing that the court's decision only applied in Broward County, where the case had been brought. The county sued to bar Fuller from the ballot, and Circuit Court Judge William Wilkes enforced the term limit provision against Fuller, removing him from the ballot.
