= Charles McBurney (politician) =

American politician

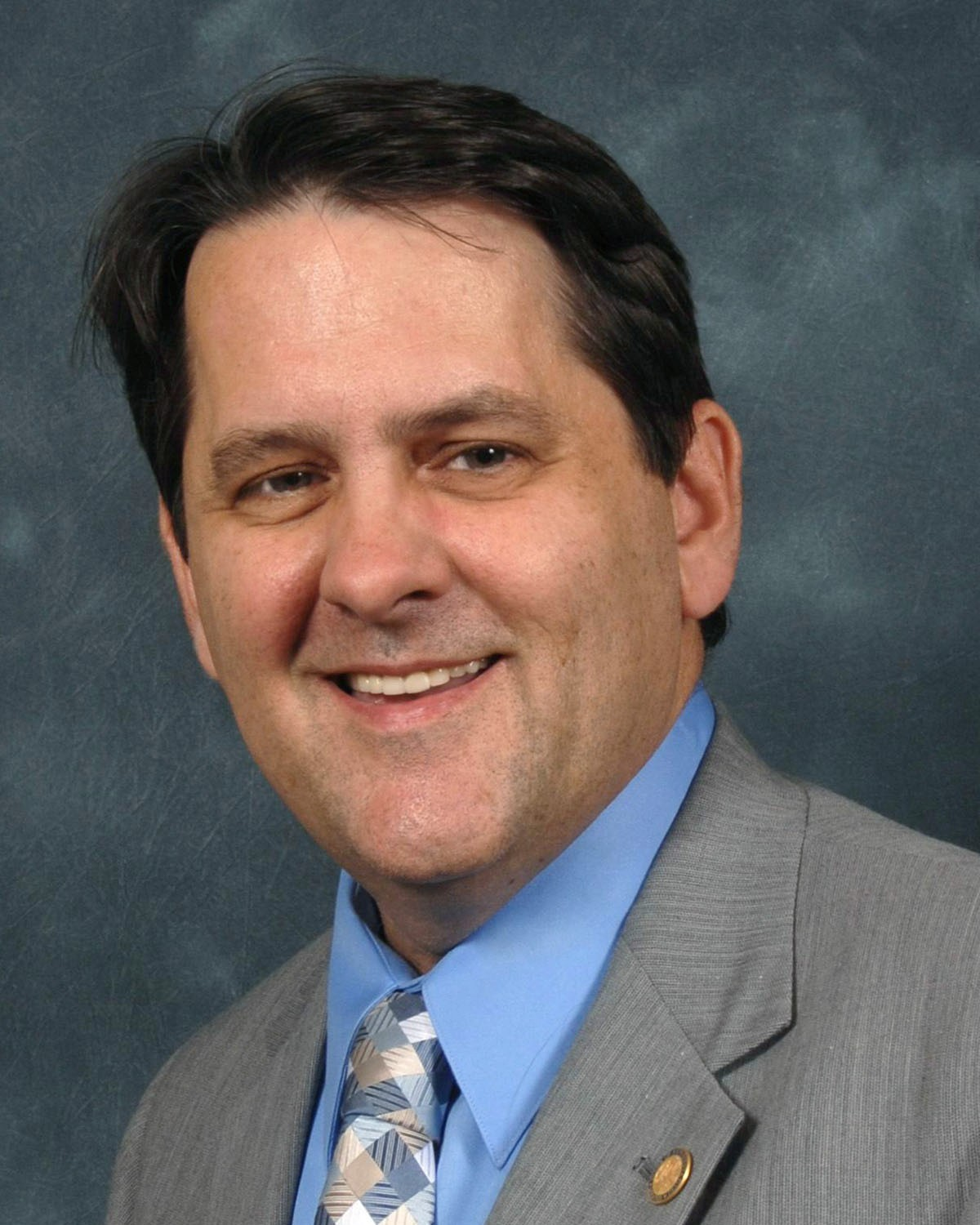

Member of the Florida House of Representatives from the 16th district
- In office September 18, 2007 – November 8, 2016
- Preceded by: Mark Mahon
- Succeeded by: Jason Fischer

Personal details
- Born: June 6, 1957 (age 69) Orlando, Florida
- Party: Republican
- Spouse: Deborah McBurney
- Children: (Step) Katherine Areford, Madeline Areford
- Education: University of Florida (B.A.) (J.D.)
- Profession: Attorney

Charles McBurney (born June 6, 1957) is a Republican who served as a member of the Florida House of Representatives, representing the 16th District, which includes parts of downtown Jacksonville in southern Duval County between 2007 and 2016.

== Early life and education ==
McBurney was born in Orlando, and was raised in part by his stepfather, William V. Chappell, Jr., who served as the Speaker of the Florida House of Representatives and as the United States Congressman from Florida's 4th congressional district from 1969 to 1989. Following his graduation from high school, McBurney attended the University of Florida, where he received his bachelor's degree in 1979, and his Juris Doctor in 1982. He started the Charles W. McBurney, Jr., Law Firm, where he continues to work as a commercial lawyer.

== Florida House of Representatives ==
When incumbent State Representative James B. Fuller was unable to seek re-election in 2000 due to term limits, McBurney ran to succeed him in the 16th District. He faced Mark Mahon in the Republican primary, which was coterminous with the general election because no other candidates filed for the seat. Mahon narrowly defeated McBurney by 416 votes, receiving 51% of the votes.

In 2007, Mahon was appointed by then-Governor Charlie Crist to serve as a Judge on the 4th Judicial Circuit, thus vacating his seat and necessitating a special election to replace him. McBurney ran in the special election to succeed Mahon. In the Republican primary, he faced former Jacksonville City Councilman Lad Daniels, who was under fire for allegedly violating open meetings laws while serving on the City Council and for misleading voters into believing that the city's police and firefighter unions had endorsed him. McBurney ended up winning the primary over Daniels by a wide margin, receiving 63% of the vote and advancing onto the general election, where he faced Debra-Jahns Nelsen, the Democratic nominee. Owing to the conservative nature of the district, McBurney defeated Nelsen in a landslide, winning 79% of the vote.

In 2008, McBurney was elected to his first full term and second term overall without any opposition in either the primary or general elections. He encountered a primary challenge in 2010 in the form of Luis Melendez, whom he easily defeated with 84% of the vote. In the general election, McBurney faced independent candidate David Baldwin, campaigning on a platform of "no frills budgeting" to provide for an increase in education funding without a tax increase. He ended up winning another term easily, besting Baldwin with 71% of the vote.

When legislative districts were reconfigured in 2012, McBurney remained in the 16th District, the composition of which did not significantly change. He won re-election without any opposition in the Republican primary or the general election.

In 2013, McBurney sponsored and the Legislature passed a rewrite of Florida’s limited liability company laws. Florida Times-Union May 3, 2013

In 2014, McBurney won the primary election with 67% of the vote against Chris Oliver. Florida Times-Union August 26, 2014 McBurney was subsequently appointed Chair of the Judiciary Committee for the Florida House of Representatives. Sunshine State News November 30, 2014.

In 2015, McBurney sponsored legislation to help the court system address issues with criminal defendants who have mental illness. Gainesville Sun March 26, 2016; News4Jax March 25, 2016; WFSU March 28, 2016. The legislation was considered the most substantive change to the way Florida deals with mental illness in 45 years. Miami Herald March 28, 2016.

=== Legislative awards ===
1. Christian Coalition Faith and Family Award 2. Florida Chamber 100 and previous year award 3. 98%, 100% and related numbers, AIF 4. 2009, 2010, 2011, 2012, 2013, 2014 Florida Chamber Honor Roll 5. Florida Alliance for Arts Education 2012 Leadership Award 6. Distinguished Legislator Award 2012 - Florida Bar Business Law Section 7. 2012 Outstanding Citizen Award - Florida Council on Social Studies 8. Distinguished Legislative Service Award - Florida Bar 2009 9. Civic Education Advocacy Award, Florida Law Related Education Association 10. Associated Builders and Contractors Friend of Free Enterprise Award, 2009, 2010, 2011, 2012, 2014

=== Legislative leadership positions ===
Chair: Judiciary, 2014-2016 Chair: Justice Appropriations 2013 2014 Chair: Judiciary Budget Conference 2014 Vice Chair: Judiciary 2011 2014 Vice Chair Education Innovation and Career Preparation 2007 2008 Vice Chair Select Committee on Standards of Official Conduct 2008 Vice Chair Criminal and Civil Justice Appropriations 2009 2010 Vice Chair Justice Appropriations 2011 2013 Vice Chair Select Committee on Redistricting 2014-2016 Duval County Legislative Chair 2012 2013 Duval County Legislative Vice Chair 2011 2012 Duval County Legislative Rules Chair 2007 2012 Leadership Team Florida House 2014-2016 Chair, St. Johns River Legislative Caucus 2015-2016

== Controversy ==
In November 2012, while McBurney and his wife were driving on Interstate 10 to Tallahassee for the legislative session, he was pulled over by Charles Swindle, a state trooper. Swindle alleged that McBurney was traveling at 87 miles per hour, exceeding the 70 mile per hour speed limit in the area, but, in an effort "to be nice," Swindle decided to "cut [McBurney] a break" because he was a legislator and cite him only for not having proof of insurance. McBurney, in turn, claimed that his proof of insurance was not requested by Swindle nor was he traveling over the speed limit, and filed a complaint with David Brierton, the Director of the Florida Highway Patrol. The Highway Patrol then terminated Swindle's position for "conduct unbecoming a public employee." Following his termination, Swindle requested a hearing before the Public Employee Relations Commission to attempt to regain his position. The hearing officer recommended that Swindle be reinstated, and noted that a separate system existed for the treatment of lawmakers by Highway Patrol officers, which "is discussed at the training academy for new troopers, is reinforced by supervisors, and is informally discussed among other employees." The First Court of Appeal upheld the Florida Public Employees Relations Commission ruling that Swindle should serve 120 hours (four weeks) suspension.

In 2015, McBurnrey was widely criticized for cutting off and laughing at a 10-year-old who was testifying at a Florida House of Representatives meeting against an anti-gay adoption bill that would prohibit same sex couples from adopting children. McBurney responded that the video was taken out of context, that all were treated equally and the young man's entire remarks were published in the committee's record.

== On the Second Amendment ==
From 2008 to 2014 McBurney held an A rating from the NRA Political Victory Fund (NRA-PVF). On March 3, 2016 USF Executive Director and NRA Past President Marion P. Hammer sent a "Florida Alert!" to members of the Unified Sportsmen of Florida (USF) and of the NRA condemning McBurney for refusing to hear "Burden of Proof", SB 344 thus killing the bill which overwhelmingly passed the Senate and was ready to enter a largely Republican House.
