= Montgomery Correctional Center =

Prison in Florida, United States

Coordinates: 30.5397°N 81.7262°W

Montgomery Correctional Center, . .. . 4727 Lannie Rd, Jaclsonville, FL2003

The Montgomery Correctional Center, previously known as the City Prison Farm (P-Farm) and Jacksonville Correctional Institution, started in 1958 on a large, 640-acre (2.6 km^{2}) tract in the northwestern Duval County, Florida.

In 1958, two large buildings were constructed for the prisoners, and a third building was constructed to accommodate facilities for canning many of the agricultural products to be raised on the broad and fertile land that surrounded the prison.

The prisoners farmed the land and grew their own vegetables, and raised pigs and cattle for meat and milk to be used in the Prison Farm operations.

By 1961, the inmate population consisted of misdemeanor offenders, which averaged approximately 200 males and 50 females. By the end of 1962, the City Prison Farm was a self-supporting facility, where they performed tasks such as agriculture, canning, freezing, meat curing, laundry and sewing.

With the consolidation of the city of Jacksonville in 1968, the City Prison Farm was renamed as the Jacksonville Correctional Institution. As Jacksonville was becoming the largest city in the United States, in terms of land area, it encompassed the prison unit.

Director Montgomery Monument

In dedication to Director James I. Montgomery, in 1986, the Jacksonville Correctional Institution was renamed the Montgomery Correctional Center.

With the ever-growing inmate population of Jacksonville, Florida, the prison had to expand its facilities. In 1976, the "B" Wing was constructed to add to the men's unit. In 1985, the "D" Wing was added to the women's division which was known as the "C" Wing. The North Unit was constructed in 1989, to replace the original "A" and "B" wings. In 1994, the original "A" and "B" wings were closed down. During 1999, the "B" Wing was renovated to become the new housing unit for the female population, and the original "C" Wing was demolished. Of the C/D wings, the remaining "D" Wing was renovated in 2002, and became the male annex, supporting the North Unit in housing male inmates since 1994. In 2015 the new Lucas Clinic was added for the inmate population's health care needs.

Located on the north side of Jacksonville, Florida, Montgomery Correctional Center currently consists of two compounds: the North Unit is designed for the sentenced and unsentenced male inmates, with a capacity of 552 prisoners; the South Unit ("B" Wing) is for sentenced male inmates, with a capacity of 160 prisoners. In addition, an Annex ("C" Wing) houses an additional 64 prisoners, with a total population of 776 for the center.

The Montgomery Correctional Center provides care, custody and control of the sentenced prisoners, while utilizing prisoner labor which has supported the general good of the citizenry of the city by providing selected work programs throughout the city.

On a daily basis, nearly two hundred men and women prisoners work on the supervised prisoner work crews which work in many troublesome areas such as: where illegal dumping occurs; deteriorating neighborhoods and in special areas where citizens have requested assistance. The Federal, state and local government agencies have also utilized the prisoner work crews throughout Duval County, Florida, to help defray their operating costs. Prisoners who are not able to work on the work crews are required to either participate in treatment or educational programs, unless they are certified sick by a member of the medical staff.

== Prison services ==
Correctional Center's services include various sections, known by the titles: Classification Unit, Maintenance Unit, Prison Industries, Food Service, Laundry and Sanitation.

Classification Unit: This group is responsible for assigning inmates to work crews throughout the Jacksonville community. The work crews have worked and assisted the city with the Streets and Highways, Parks and Recreation, Jacksonville Electric Authority, and Park Maintenance. They also provide classification inmates for on-campus work crews such as the Agriculture Unit, Nursery, Metal Fabrication Shop, Machinery Repair Shop, Bedding Repair, Silk Screening and Shoe Repair Shops.

Maintenance Unit: This unit utilizes skilled prisoners to maintain the facility's physical plant. They have performed construction and repaired multitudes of projects such as remodeling areas in the North and South Units' administrative buildings which accommodate the non-contact visitation center.

Prison Industry Unit: This group consists of a mattress/sewing factory, a shoe repair factory, and a silk-screening factory. The Mattress Factory repairs and recovers mattresses, pillows, blankets, prisoner clothing, and the mending for the Mounted Patrol and K-9 Units. The Shoe Repair Factory repairs and reconditions prisoner footwear which is to be redistributed to incoming sentenced prisoners. The Silk Screen Factory provides silk screening for prisoner clothing. Their primary responsibility is to print the Department of Corrections insignia on all prisoner garments used within the Department.

Food Service Unit: This unit is operated through a contracted food service and annually provides approximately 700,000 meals, at an approximate cost of $750,000.00.

Prisoner Laundry Service: This group is responsible for over 10,000 loads of laundry every year.

Medical Services: This section provides all aspects of the medical services for the prisoners at Montgomery Correctional Center, including mental health and dental services. Nursing staff is on site, around-the-clock, for any medical emergencies, and a physician's assistant is available five days a week. The physician is on site two times a week. There is always an "on-call" physician available at all times. Sick call is available seven days a week and chronic care conditions are managed on-site, however, any special off-site referrals are taken to the city's hospital, UF Health Jacksonville.

Corrections Commissary Service: This group is contracted to operate the prisoner's commissary. They are responsible for handling all aspects of the commissary services for the prisoners. The program functions in a cost-effective manner, providing the prisoners with essential health and comfort items.

Chaplain Service: This section of the Malone Correctional Center handles the delivery of emergency messages, religious concerns, personal issues, and family problems of the prisoners. They also coordinate worship services and the hours of volunteers.

Agriculture Unit:

Agriculture Mechanic's Crew: This crew is responsible for doing (A), (B), and some (C) service inspections and minor repairs on the 30-plus city vehicles which are assigned to Montgomery Correctional Center. They are also responsible for the repairs and maintenance on 100 pieces of lawn and small-engine equipment which is also assigned to Montgomery Correctional Center.

Landscape and Nursery Crew: This crew is responsible for the daily pick-up and compacting of trash from the various areas of the center. They also are in charge of mowing 20 acres (81,000 m^{2}) and the lawn conditioning and trimming, and take care of removal of trees, clearing fence lines and ditches on the remaining 800 acres (3.2 km²). The Land and Nursery Crew also assists with the clean up and landscaping for the Police and Fire Pension Fund Office and the Help Center. They have also planted trees for the Florida Community College at Jacksonville North Campus and assisted with landscape duties for the Criminal Justice Training Center. The Crew has also been responsible for planting, maintaining and harvesting a 2-acre (8,100 m^{2}) vegetable garden which produces approximately 15,000 pounds (6800 kg) of fresh vegetables which are donated to nonprofit organization, including homeless centers, children's centers and senior citizen centers. The unit also maintains a green house that cultivates office plants, small shrubbery and border grass from cuttings and seeds which benefits the Jacksonville Sheriff's Office, other city and county agencies and nonprofit organizations. This unit has received awards from Jax Pride and other similar agencies for their outstanding work in support of the City.

Metal Shop Crew: This crew is responsible for designing and manufacturing equipment for the Jacksonville Sheriff's Office and other city and county agencies. They have built and installed doors, windows, wrought iron fences and gates, and a number of other metal items for government end-users. They have constructed dog kennels and dog boxes, and modified vehicles to meet the needs of the Sheriff's K-9 units.
