= Murder of Johnnie Mae Chappell =

1964 murder in Jacksonville, Florida

Johnnie Mae Chappell (c. 1929 – March 23, 1964) was an American murder victim during a race riot in Jacksonville, Florida, killed by a gunshot from a passing car. After evidence and documents went missing, her killer was convicted of manslaughter and served only three years in prison. The other passengers were never charged. Detectives working the investigation claimed they lost their jobs due to their complaints regarding police racism and how the case was handled.

== Life ==
Johnnie Mae Chappell was a mother of 10 and worked as a cleaner. Her husband was named Willie, and worked two jobs.

== Death ==
During a race riot in Jacksonville, Florida on the evening of March 23, 1964, Chappell (then 35) was walking along U.S. Route 1 northwest of the city looking for her wallet, which had fallen from her bag while carrying groceries home. As she walked, four men drove past in a blue Plymouth, one of whom fired a gunshot which hit Chappell. After being found by her husband who had left the house to look for her, Chappell was being transported to a hospital in an ambulance when she died.

As word of Chappell's killing spread, riots escalated in the city.

== Investigations ==
The case of Chappell's death went unsolved for months until two sheriff detectives, Lee Cody and Donald Coleman Sr., interrogated a young local called Wayne Chessman about the murder. Chessman confessed to being in the car with three other men, giving their names and details of the evening. Chessman stated that a man named J.W. Rich was the one to fire the gun; he and the other passengers were subsequently arrested by Cody and Coleman who say they then confessed to shooting Chappell. When they went to read the paperwork regarding Chappell's death, however, they found that it was missing. They later found under the mat in the office of their boss, detective chief James Patrick Sr., along with about 30 other reports involving cases which Patrick Sr. wanted dropped.

The four men went to trial, but the gun used in the shooting went missing and the detectives were not asked to testify about the confessions. As a result, the jury convicted Rich, who claimed that he didn't intend to kill Chappell, of manslaughter and the charges were dropped against the other men. Rich served three years of a 10-year sentence, and Cody and Coleman were demoted and later fired by detective chief James C. Patrick Sr. after complaining about racism and corruption in the department.

On the 32nd anniversary of Chappell's murder one of her sons, Shelton, organized a memorial church service for their family. Having seen an article about the planned service in the local newspaper, Cody attended, and told the family the details of Chappell's murder and his investigation. In 2005 Cody and Shelton filed a civil rights lawsuit against the city of Jacksonville and the men in the car; the suit was dismissed but Jeb Bush asked the Florida Department of Law Enforcement to re-open the murder investigation.

== James Patrick Sr. ==
On December 14, 1969, 47-year-old James Patrick Sr. (June 19, 1922 – December 14, 1969) was fatally shot by his son, James Patrick Jr., after beating his wife in a drunken rage. Both Patrick Jr. and his mother later said the elder Patrick was a heavy drinker who'd abused them for years, and had fired a gun at them on at least one occasion. Patrick Jr. had repeatedly struck his father in self-defense in the past. In the last instance prior to the shooting, Patrick Sr. warned his son that if he ever fought back again, he'd kill him. Patrick Jr. was arrested and charged with murder. After a coroner's jury split on whether Patrick Jr. should face prosecution, he was allowed to plead guilty to manslaughter and received a 5-year suspended sentence.

Despite the circumstances of his death, Patrick Sr., who'd worked as a police officer in 1950, enjoyed a relatively positive posthumous reputation for years. However, in the 1980s, it was found that he had been extremely corrupt, took his teenage son to Ku Klux Klan rallies, and abused detainees. Two months prior to his death, his son was among those arrested in a narcotics raid. However, Patrick Jr. was only booked on charges of vagrancy that were later dropped. Patrick had broken the ribs of suspects on several occasions, in one instance beating a man unconscious. In August 1982, Donald Coleman testified that Sheriff Dale Carson and James Patrick Sr. took bribes took cover up murder investigations.

On February 24, 1960, Beverly June Cochran, a 19-year-old housewife, vanished. In the fall of 1962, Florida police took prime suspect Emmett Spencer from prison to a hotel for interrogation. Spencer, a Kentucky drifter and serial killer who'd served nearly 10 years in prison for manslaughter, had been called the "dream killer" by newspapers, since he'd claimed to know details of various murders since he'd dreamt them. Carson and Patrick had previously interrogated Spencer in Miami, where Patrick beat him unconscious and broke two of his ribs. Spencer had bragged of committing dozens of murders, albeit he was later deemed to be a pathological liar. Spencer would only be convicted of one murder, that of Johnnie Keen, whom he beat to death with a hammer on April 15, 1960. Spencer was convicted of first degree murder in that case and sentenced to death, albeit his sentence was later reduced to life in prison. He died in prison in 1996.

Spencer was strongly implicated in three other murders, that of Beverly Cochran, Dr. John Hunt, who was slain in the Idaho desert in 1959, and Virginia Tomlinson and Leon "Shorty" Hammel, both of whom he'd met during a road trip. While stopping at a gas station, Mary Catherine Hampton, Spencer's girlfriend, overheard Spencer and Shorty talking about killing a woman. Shortly after, Spencer pulled the car over in an isolated area, took Tomlinson into the woods, and killed her. He later did the same to Shorty. Spencer stopped in Florida in April 1960, where he rented an apartment. However, he fled only three days later, after killing Johnnie Keen. Spencer was finally arrested after a police chase, after being seen speeding.

While in custody, Spencer said he didn't kill Beverly June Cochran, but he knew who did: his friend, Clarence McCormick. Clarence was the son of beach construction owner B.B. McCormick, a friend of Patrick, and had stalked Cochran prior to her death and once broke into her house. He'd repeatedly been arrested in the past, but was always released due to the intervention of his father. According to Spencer, he'd abducted Cochran from her new home, and brought her to an apartment complex at the beach. There, Clarence broke her arms with a tire iron and then beat her to death. Spencer's account of the crime appeared to become increasingly credible, as his landlady recalled finding a blood-soaked mattress in an empty apartment next to his, which she'd never reported. Patrick suppressed evidence in the case, and later announced that "information developed in recent weeks" indicated that Cochran was still alive and had left home of her own accord. Clarence McCormick later became a career bank robber. In 1965, he was sentenced to 15 years in federal prison for bank robbery. He was paroled in the 1970s. McCormick continued to live a criminal lifestyle, albeit he often received leniency in exchange for helping the authorities. On January 20, 1980, McCormick, 54, was fatally shot by an accomplice in a robbery at a motel in Georgia.

Patrick also took bribes in the case of the June 29, 1964, murder of Glen Monroe, a banker's son who was shot twice in the back and dumped on a deserted beach access ramp. Wealthy Atlantic Beach socialite and shopping mall developer Bobby Jacobs became the prime suspect in the murder. However, the investigation was ended after Jacobs paid a bribe to Patrick. In March 1974, a man named Raymond Beauchesne tried to abduct Jacobs from his home. He then shot Jacobs and killed a security guard, before committing suicide. Jacobs was critically injured, but survived.

In 1965, Patrick Sr. was placed on leave for evidence tampering. His wife later testified that afterwards, his drinking became even worse, ultimately culminating in his death.
