= Dale Carson =

American politician (born 1922)

1st Sheriff of Jacksonville (Note: First elected as Duval County sheriff, his tenure coincided with the Jacksonville Consolidation, becoming the first sheriff of Jacksonville.)
- In office 1958–1986
- Preceded by: Al Cahill
- Succeeded by: Jim McMillan

Personal details
- Born: Dale George Carson; January 16, 1922 Amsterdam, Ohio, US
- Died: May 27, 2000 (aged 78) Jacksonville, Florida, US
- Party: Democratic
- Spouse: Doris Newell
- Children: 3
- Education: Ohio State University (BS)

Dale George Carson (January 16, 1922 – May 27, 2000) was an American politician and former FBI Special Agent who served as the sheriff of Jacksonville, Florida for almost three decades. First elected as Duval County sheriff, his tenure coincided with the Jacksonville Consolidation, becoming the first sheriff of Jacksonville. He was a member of the Democratic Party.

== Life and education ==
Carson was born in Amsterdam, Ohio, the eldest of three children of Dale and Lillian Carson. His father was a dentist who died when Carson was 13. Following high school, Carson joined the United States Army during World War II. He was awarded several medals for his service. Upon his return, he was employed as a Columbus, Ohio police officer while attending classes at Ohio State University for a bachelor's degree in 1949 where he majored in criminology.

== Law enforcement ==
After college, he worked for two years with the B&O Railroad in Cincinnati, Ohio as a detective before the FBI hired him in 1951, which later sent him to a field assignment in the south. Carson was a young, clean-cut FBI agent at the Jacksonville FBI office.

In 1958, Florida Governor LeRoy Collins suspended William Alpheus "Al" Cahill after a grand jury investigated the Duval Sheriff for gambling, bribery, illegal liquor sales and gross incompetence. Collins then appointed Carson as a replacement. At the time, the Duval County Sheriff's department co-existed with the Jacksonville Police department.

The sheriff's office and FBI jointly investigated alleged municipal corruption in the early 1960s. Carson supported the merger of Jacksonville city and county government agencies and took a leading role in the process. The Jacksonville Chief of Police D.K. Brown became the Jacksonville Sheriff's Office Undersheriff.

Ed Austin, former Jacksonville mayor and state attorney commented:

"Dale took those two agencies and created a masterpiece, the Jacksonville Sheriff's Office. He was exactly the right man for the job. He did not tolerate any type of misconduct or corruption. If he found any, he cleaned it out in a hurry. He was tough but fair, and he was the most totally honest person I've known. He had to make some tough and unpopular decisions, but somehow the public always knew he was acting professionally and with unquestioned integrity. He was a good friend, and I am going to miss him."

The voters trusted Sheriff Carson and re-elected him seven times. Carson was a pioneer in setting minimum standards and improving training for police officers which made him known in law enforcement circles across the nation. In 1976, Carson attended the FBI National Academy to enhance his credentials.

When Clarence M. Kelley retired as Director of the FBI in 1978. Carson was one of three people considered by President Jimmy Carter as a replacement.

Carson retired in 1986 and Governor Bob Graham appointed Jim McMillan as his replacement.

== Racial problems ==
Jacksonville experienced widespread racial strife during the 1960s.

Ax Handle Saturday was a racially motivated attack on August 27, 1960 in downtown Jacksonville. A group of about 200 white men with baseball bats and ax handles assaulted a group of mostly black young people participating in sit-ins at segregated lunch counters. Many of the attackers were alleged to have Ku Klux Klan affiliations. The city police refused to intercede, Mayor Haydon Burns claimed there was no violence, and both local newspapers buried the story. An FBI informant had learned of the KKK plans and gave a report to his handler who placed it on County Sheriff Carson's desk. However, it was intercepted by someone, and Carson never got the warning.

The Murder of Johnnie Mae Chappell was a drive-by shooting of a black woman by four white men in 1964. The case of Chappell's death went unsolved for months until two sheriff detectives, Lee Cody and Donald Coleman Sr., interrogated a young local called Wayne Chessman about the murder. Chessman confessed to being in the car with three other men, giving their names and details of the evening. Chessman stated that a man named J.W. Rich was the one to fire the gun; he and the other passengers were subsequently arrested by Cody and Coleman who say they then confessed to shooting Chappell. When they went to read the paperwork regarding Chappell's death, however, they found that it was missing. They later found under the mat in the office of their boss, detective chief James Patrick Sr., along with about 30 other reports involving cases which Patrick Sr. wanted dropped.

The four men went to trial, but the gun used in the shooting went missing and the detectives were not asked to testify about the confessions. As a result, the jury convicted Rich, who claimed that he didn't intend to kill Chappell, of manslaughter and the charges were dropped against the other men. Rich served three years of a 10-year sentence, and Cody and Coleman were demoted and later fired after complaining about racism and corruption in the department. Cody said, "Here is a Black woman gunned down in cold blood on a dark, lonely highway, and none of them cared. We lived in a racist city and a racist town run by racist people."

Detectives Cody and Coleman were later reinstated and received back pay by the Civil Service Board. Cody authored a book, The 14th Denial that detailed those events and the involvement of Sheriff Carson.

== Affiliations ==
- American Society of Criminology
- Florida Sheriffs Association, president 1970–1971
- National Sheriffs' Association, director
- National Advisory Commission on Criminal Justice Standards and Goals, Vice chairman 1971
- Shriners & Civitan clubs
- Marquis Who's Who, noteworthy sheriff

== Civic contributions ==
Carson helped start Jacksonville's Police Athletic League and supported the Riverside Tradition House, his church's ministry for recovering alcoholics. Carson attended Riverside Presbyterian Church where he was a Sunday school teacher and church elder for 30 years.

== Personal life ==
Carson's wife Doris was a physician and Baptist Medical Center Chief of staff who died in 2008. The couple had three children, Dale Jr, Chris and Cyndi plus eight grandchildren. In their retirement, the couple played golf at the Timuquana Country Club most Sunday afternoons and enjoyed a summer home in the mountains of North Carolina where they would camp and hike and camp on the Appalachian Trail. He also liked to hunt, go boating and take photographs.
