= 2022 Jacksonville Sheriff special election =

- November 8, 2022
Candidate	T.K. Waters	Lakesha Burton
Party	Republican	Democratic
Popular vote	180,285	146,785
Percentage	55.12%	44.88%
Sheriff before election
Pat Ivey
Republican
Elected Sheriff
T.K. Waters
Republican

The 2022 Jacksonville Sheriff special election was held on August 23, 2022, to elect the next sheriff of Jacksonville, Florida, United States. Incumbent sheriff Pat Ivey, previously the undersheriff, was appointed interim sheriff by Governor DeSantis after his predecessor Mike Williams resigned. Ivey was not a candidate in the election. As no candidates received more than 50% of the vote in the general election, a runoff was held on November 8, 2022, coinciding with the regularly scheduled elections in Florida. T.K. Waters ultimately won the race with 55% of the vote compared to Burton's 45%.

== General election ==
=== Candidates ===
==== Advanced to runoff ====
- Lakesha Burton (Democrat), assistant chief of the Jacksonville Sheriff's department
- T. K. Waters (Republican), chief of investigations of the Jacksonville Sheriff's department

==== Eliminated in general ====
- Wayne Clark (Democrat), former assistant chief of the Duval County School Police Department (endorsed Burton)
- Tony Cummings (Democrat), Army Military Police Corps veteran, candidate for sheriff in 2015 and runner-up for sheriff in 2019
- Ken Jefferson (Democrat), retired police officer, former WJXT crime and safety analyst and runner-up for sheriff in 2015

==== Withdrawn ====
- Mathew Nemeth (Republican), chief of special events of the Jacksonville Sheriff's department (endorsed Waters)

=== Endorsements ===
T.K. Waters (R)

Statewide officials

- Ron DeSantis, Governor of Florida

=== Debate ===
A televised debate was held at Jacksonville University on August 10.

=== Polling ===
Poll source	Date(s) administered	Sample size (Note: Key: A – all adults RV – registered voters LV – likely voters V – unclear)	Margin of error	Lakesha Burton (D)	Wayne Clark (D)	Tony Cummings (D)	Ken Jefferson (D)	T.K. Waters (R)	Undecided
University of North Florida	August 8–12, 2022	491 (LV)	± 5.9%	39%	4%	5%	8%	41%	3%

=== Results ===
2022 Jacksonville Sheriff special election
Party	Candidate	Votes	%
Republican	T.K. Waters	86,298	46.71
Democratic	Lakesha Burton	60,583	32.79
Democratic	Ken Jefferson	25,943	14.04
Democratic	Wayne Clark	6,494	3.51
Democratic	Tony Cummings	5,432	2.94
Total votes		184,750	100.00

== General election runoff ==
=== Results ===
2022 Jacksonville Sheriff special election runoff
Party	Candidate	Votes	%
Republican	T.K. Waters	180,285	55.12
Democratic	Lakesha Burton	146,785	44.88
Total votes			
