= Jason Fischer (politician) =

American politician

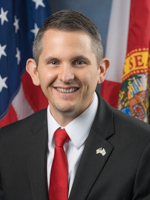

Member of the Florida House of Representatives from the 16th district
- In office November 8, 2016 – November 8, 2022
- Preceded by: Charles McBurney
- Succeeded by: Kiyan Michael

Personal details
- Born: November 25, 1983 (age 42) Jacksonville, Florida, U.S.
- Party: Republican
- Spouse: Melinda Fischer
- Children: 3
- Education: University of North Florida (BS)

Jason Fischer (born November 25, 1983) is an American engineer and politician who served as a member of the Florida House of Representatives for the 16th district from 2016 to 2022. He is a member of the Republican Party.

== Early life and education ==
Fischer was born and raised in Jacksonville, Florida. He earned a Bachelor of Science degree in electrical engineering from the University of North Florida.

== Career ==
In addition to serving in the Florida House, Jason Fischer previously worked for Florida Power & Light and spent five years as a civilian engineer for the Naval Facilities Engineering Systems Command. Fischer is employed by HNTB, an infrastructure firm.

=== Duval County School Board ===
Fischer’s career in politics began on the Duval County School Board, where he served from 2012-2016. Fischer represented the 7th district on the School Board, garnering the most votes in the six-way primary in August 2012.

Fischer ran for the School Board in part to expand choice offerings for families and improve the district’s academic performance. He was well-known as an advocate for school choice while serving on the Board.

During Fischer’s time on the board, the number of charter schools jumped from nine to over 30. Additionally, the school district’s performance improved from “C” to “B.”

=== Florida House of Representatives ===
Fischer ran unopposed in the 2016 general election in District 16, having defeated his challenger, Dick Kravitz, 53-47% in the Republican primary. Fischer replaced Representative Charles McBurney, who served the maximum 8-year term in the Florida House.

Fischer was reelected to the Florida House in 2018, garnering 59% of the vote against Democrat Ken Organes.

As a state legislator, Fischer focused much of his time on issues pertaining to education, infrastructure, and technology.

In 2019, Fischer passed legislation to allow for more autonomous vehicle usage in Florida, making the state a leader in the technology.

Fischer sponsored legislation to reduce the Communications Services Tax, state and local taxes that Floridians pay on cable, cell phones, and streaming bills.

In 2017, Fischer sponsored and passed legislation creating a civil cause of action for a person injured or killed by an act of terrorism.

That year, Fischer also passed legislation to expand access to the state’s Gardiner Scholarship Program for students with disabilities and also the Florida Tax Credit Scholarship Program for low-income families. In addition, Fischer was the prime co-sponsor of legislation protecting Second Amendment rights that shifted the burden of proof in pretrial hearings to the State in cases involving Stand Your Ground immunity.

Fischer ran for Duval County property appraiser in the March 21, 2023 election. Jacksonville City Councilwoman Joyce Morgan finished ahead of Fischer in the March election, with 48% of the vote to 31%. Since neither received more than 50% of the vote, they faced each other in a runoff. Fischer lost the runoff election on May 16 to Morgan.

== Personal life ==
Fischer is married to his wife, Melinda, and they have three children. They reside in the Mandarin neighborhood of Jacksonville.
