= Jim McMillan (Florida sheriff) =

American politician (born 1937)

2nd Sheriff of Jacksonville
- In office 1986–1995
- Preceded by: Dale Carson
- Succeeded by: Nat Glover

Personal details
- Born: James Everett McMillan; January 15, 1937 (age 89) Gainesville, Florida, US
- Party: Democratic
- Spouse: Elizabeth B.
- Education: University of Florida (BS)

Jim McMillan (born January 15, 1937) is an American politician and former law enforcement officer who served as the third sheriff of Jacksonville, Florida, from 1986 to 1996. He is a member of the Democratic Party.

== Life and education ==
McMillan was born in Gainesville, Florida, the only child of George and Doris McMillan. His father was a painter at the University of Florida. The family moved to Jacksonville during World War II. He graduated from Andrew Jackson High School in 1955 and earned his bachelor's degree from the University of Florida in 1959.

== Law enforcement ==
McMillan joined the Jacksonville Sheriff's Office after college. In 1986, Florida governor Bob Graham appointed him as sheriff following the retirement of Dale Carson. He campaigned for the office and in the May 1987 general election garnered nearly 82% of the vote. The downtown Pretrial Detention Center (Jail) was completed during his administration. He ran unopposed for a second term in 1991 and retired in 1996.

== Personal life ==
McMillan is married to his wife, Elizabeth. McMillan's son, Jim Jr. works for the State Attorney's Office as a forensic artist. Previously his son was an officer and sketch artist for 16 years at JSO.
