= Kiyan Michael =

American politician

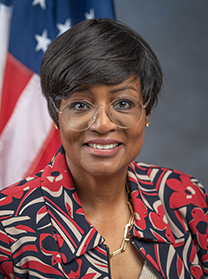

Member of the Florida House of Representatives from the 16th district
- Incumbent
- Assumed office November 8, 2022
- Preceded by: Jason Fischer

Personal details
- Born: September 20, 1964 (age 62)
- Party: Republican (2014–present); Democratic (until 2014)
- Spouse: Robert "Bobby" Michael Jr.
- Children: 2 (Note: One child is deceased.)

Military service
- Branch/service: United States Navy

Kiyan Michael (born September 20, 1964) is an American politician serving as a member of the Florida House of Representatives for the 16th district. She assumed office on November 8, 2022. She lives in Jacksonville, Florida.

She is an alumna of Wagner Leadership Institute. She is married and has two children.

== Career ==
Michael was a member of the Black Voices for Trump Advisory Board until she launched her campaign for state house. Michael has also provided commentary on immigration policy for Fox News. She was elected to the Florida House of Representatives in November 2022.

== Personal life ==
Michael is married to a retired Navy veteran, with whom she has two children. In 2007, her son Brandon, was killed by an illegal immigrant in broad daylight.
