= Florida's 16th House of Representatives district =

American legislative district

Florida's 16th State House of Representatives district
- The 16th district in comparison to Jacksonville, Florida
Representative
Kiyan Michael; R–Jacksonville

Florida's 16th House of Representatives district elects one member of the Florida House of Representatives.

== Members ==
- James B. "Jim" Fuller (until 2000)
- Mark Mahon (2000 to 2007)
- Charles McBurney (2007 to 2016)
- Jason Fischer (2016 to 2022)
- Kiyan Michael (since 2022)
