= Jacksonville Sheriff's Office =

Joint city-county law enforcement agency

Coordinates: 30.325381°N 81.652126°W

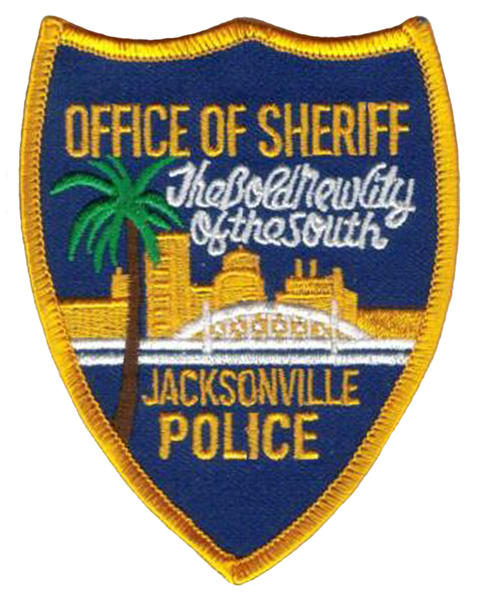
- JSO patch

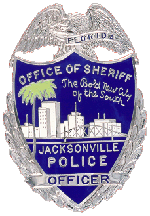
- JSO badge
- Abbreviation: JSO

Agency overview
- Formed: 1968; 58 years ago
- Preceding agencies: Jacksonville Police Department (1871–1968); Duval County Sheriff's Office (1822–1968)
- Employees: 3,032 (2020)
- Annual budget: $482 million (2020)

Jurisdictional structure
- Operations jurisdiction: United States
- Map of Jacksonville Sheriff's Office's jurisdiction
- Legal jurisdiction: Duval County

Operational structure
- Headquarters: 501 E. Bay Street, Jacksonville, Florida
- Sworn members: 2,082 police officers; 950 corrections officers
- Unsworn members: 800 civilians
- Agency executive: T. K. Waters, Sheriff

Website
- www.jaxsheriff.org

The Jacksonville Sheriff's Office (JSO) is a joint city-county law enforcement agency which has primary responsibility for law enforcement, investigation, and corrections within the consolidated City of Jacksonville and Duval County, Florida, United States.

While the landmass of the City of Jacksonville makes up the vast majority of the geographical area of Duval County, the county also contains the smaller incorporated cities of Atlantic Beach, Baldwin, Jacksonville Beach, and Neptune Beach. The beach cities, as well as the University of North Florida and Jacksonville International Airport, also operate their own police departments. In these jurisdictions, primary law enforcement services are typically provided by the local police department, except for enforcement of civil court processes (for example, property evictions) which by Florida statute are the responsibility of the county sheriff's office.

== History ==
=== Jacksonville Police Department: 1822–1968 ===
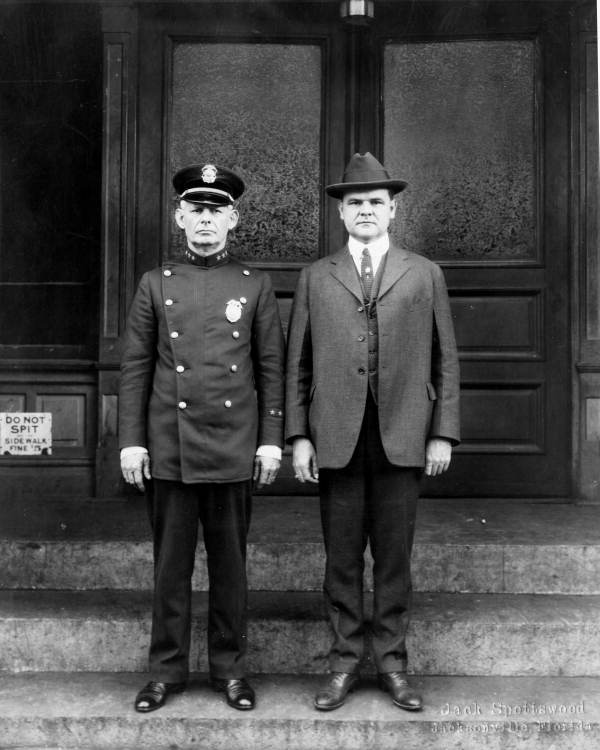
Police Chief A. J. Roberts with Mayor John W. Martin around 1923

The first sheriff to be appointed in Jacksonville was James Dell in 1822 when Duval County was incorporated.

A town ordinance in 1845 required all free males living in Jacksonville to participate in evening patrol duty.

From 1865 to 1869 law enforcement was enforced by the continued occupation of the Union Army and a provost marshal and guard.

A civilian marshal was appointed as head of the department in 1871, along with the creation of the captain of police rank. The mayor appointed the captain, who would then be confirmed by the city council. In 1887 the captain of police rank became known as chief of police. A new charter was also established in 1887, creating a board of police commissioners. The department was composed mostly of African Americans.

House Bill No. 4 was passed by the Florida State Legislature allowing the governor to abolish all offices in Jacksonville and to make new appointments to fill the vacancies.

The police force in 1889 consisted of a chief, three officers and 24 patrolmen.

The first patrol wagon, pulled by two horses, was used in 1895.

In 1904, as the automobile became more popular, the speed limit was set at 6 miles per hour. The first automobile patrol car was established in 1911.

=== Jacksonville Sheriff's Office: 1968–present ===
In 1967 a mandate was given by residents of Jacksonville and Duval County with 65 percent of the votes cast in favor of consolidating the city (Jacksonville Police Department) and county governments (Duval County Sheriff's Office). On October 1, 1968, the two governmental bodies were replaced with "a single unified government". The new organization, the Office of the Sheriff – Jacksonville Police, paralleled the name of the new jurisdiction. The four other municipalities within Duval County (Jacksonville Beach, Atlantic Beach, Neptune Beach and Baldwin) retained their own police departments. However, the Baldwin city council voted to disband their police department by 2007; at midnight on March 13, 2006, the sheriff's office took over responsibility of police services.

Starting in the late 1980s, the agency adopted the Glock 17 9×19mm pistol as their sidearm. The agency still issues Glock 17s as the sidearm.

On June 2, 2022, Mike Williams announced his retirement a year prior to the end of his second term. He moved his residence to nearby Nassau County in 2021 despite a Jacksonville Charter rule that requires elected officials to live in Duval County. Williams considered filing suit to challenge the law, but decided against it. Public criticism that the leader of law enforcement was violating the rules forced Williams to make a choice. He stated that his last day would be June 10. Undersheriff Pat Ivey was appointed by Governor Ron DeSantis to replace Williams, and was sworn in on June 11, 2022. A special election was held August 23. No candidate received 50% of the vote, so a runoff was held on November 8, 2022. T.K. Waters (R) beat Lakesha Burton (D) 55%-45% on the November 8th election. Waters was sworn in on Sunday, November 20, 2022, in front of his church congregation. Waters was unopposed in the spring 2023 municipal election.

==== 2025 viral traffic stop arrest ====
Body camera footage of McNeil Jr.'s arrest

In July 2025, a video of a traffic stop conducted by JSO officers on February 19 went viral. The video, shot by the driver of the vehicle, 22-year-old William McNeil Jr., shows McNeil Jr. arguing with the officers after they claimed he was required to have his headlights on even when it was not raining, and after McNeil Jr. asks for the officers' supervisor, an officer on the driver-side of the vehicle smashes the window and punches McNeil Jr. in the face. The officers then forcefully remove McNeil Jr. from the vehicle and video shows McNeil Jr. being punched at least one more time.

Florida Senator Shevrin Jones released a statement calling the incident "deeply disturbing and completely unacceptable", while Florida Representative Angie Nixon said that she reached out to the Sheriff's Office about the incident, deaths in jail, and other instances of potential JSO misconduct. McNeil Jr. hired prominent civil rights lawyers Ben Crump and Harry Daniels to represent him in the case. Crump released a statement saying, "It should be obvious to anyone watching this video that William McNeil wasn’t a threat to anyone," and that McNeil Jr. was, "...exercising his constitutional rights," before being attacked. On July 29, McNeil Jr.'s lawyers alleged that bodycam footage showed a JSO officer standing in front of McNeil Jr.'s vehicle and holding him at gunpoint before he was dragged from the vehicle, and that, after he was handcuffed, the officers repeatedly slammed his head against the pavement. McNeil Jr. also said that the incident traumatized him and that he suffered a brain injury.

The JSO released a statement saying that they were conducting an internal investigation into the incident and that they "hold [their] officers to the highest standards and are committed to thoroughly determining exactly what occurred". A police report released by the JSO claimed that McNeil Jr. reached for a "large knife" on his floorboard, a claim which McNeil Jr.'s lawyers denied, and that three and a half grams of marijuana and drug paraphernalia were removed from the vehicle after McNeil Jr.'s arrest, but made no mention of McNeil Jr. being punched. On July 22, Sheriff T. K. Waters responded to the incident, saying that the footage did not "comprehensively capture the circumstances surrounding the incident" as McNeil Jr. had allegedly locked himself inside the vehicle and refused to cooperate and that the State Attorney's Office reviewed the incident and determined that the officers did not break any laws. Waters also added that in addition to the marijuana and drug paraphernalia, McNeil Jr. was charged with resisting an officer, driving on a suspended license, and not wearing a seatbelt. The arresting officer also consented to his body-worn camera footage being made public and he was stripped of his badge pending the outcome of the investigation.

=== Elected sheriffs ===
- 1903–1904 John Price
- 1913–1915 W. H. "Ham" Dowling
- 1924–1928 W. B. Cahoon
- 1932–1957 Rex Sweat
- 1957–1958 William Alpheus "Al" Cahill
- 1958–1986 Dale Carson
- 1986–1996 Jim McMillan
- 1996–2004 Nat Glover
- 2004–2015 John Rutherford
- 2015–2022 Mike Williams
- June–November 2022 Pat Ivey
- November 2022 – present T. K. Waters

=== Headquarters ===
Prior to the Police/Sheriff merger in 1968, Jacksonville Police Headquarters was located at 711 Liberty Street. It was opened in September 1926.

==== East Bay Street ====
On February 18, 1974 ground was broken for the Police Administration Building at 501 East Bay Street. It was later renamed Police Memorial Building (PMB). The adjacent jail was constructed in 1990. In 2024 JSO stated that the fifty-year old building was inadequate for the agency's needs. The PMB provided just 215 parking spaces for 739 employees, requiring lease of a grass lot across the street. Total PMB office space was 165,466 sq ft (15,372.3 m^{2}) which forced 184 JSO employees to work in off-site office space. In 2025 JSO was facing a $6 million bill for work on the PMB including replacing flooring, air handling units and work on the helicopter landing pad on the rooftop. The fueling station was the only police function destined to remain at East Bay Street.

==== Florida Blue Building ====
The Florida Blue Building (FBB) is actually multiple structures located on eight acres on Riverside Avenue in the Brooklyn neighborhood. The 571,459 sq ft (53,090.3 m^{2}) complex includes a 10-story building constructed in 1950 with the adjacent 22-story tower added in 1971. A 4-story parking garage was built in 1973.

JSO reviewed more than 25 properties before picking Florida Blue for a new headquarters. In addition to room for growth, the location offered emergency backup power; maintenance provided by the building's owner would result in significant savings for the city. In early 2023, JSO and the city began discussions regarding a department move from the PMB to a Brooklyn location.

The City Council approved a multi-year lease in September 2023 for space in the Florida Blue Building for their JSO Homeland Security Department and select crime labs. The initial 12.5-year lease included two 5-year extensions. A building permit was issued by the city in May 2024 for the initial build-out.

In January 2025 the Mayor’s Budget Review Committee agreed to send legislation to city council for an amended and restated lease that would include 341,959 sq ft (31,769.0 m^{2}), nearly 60% of the tower. The lease would also include 1700 parking spaces. Owner Blue Cross and Blue Shield of Florida Inc. agreed to provide $27 million for tenant build out. Office furniture would also be transferred from the owner's Deerwood campus offices. The term of the new lease agreement exceeds 26 years.

== Organization ==
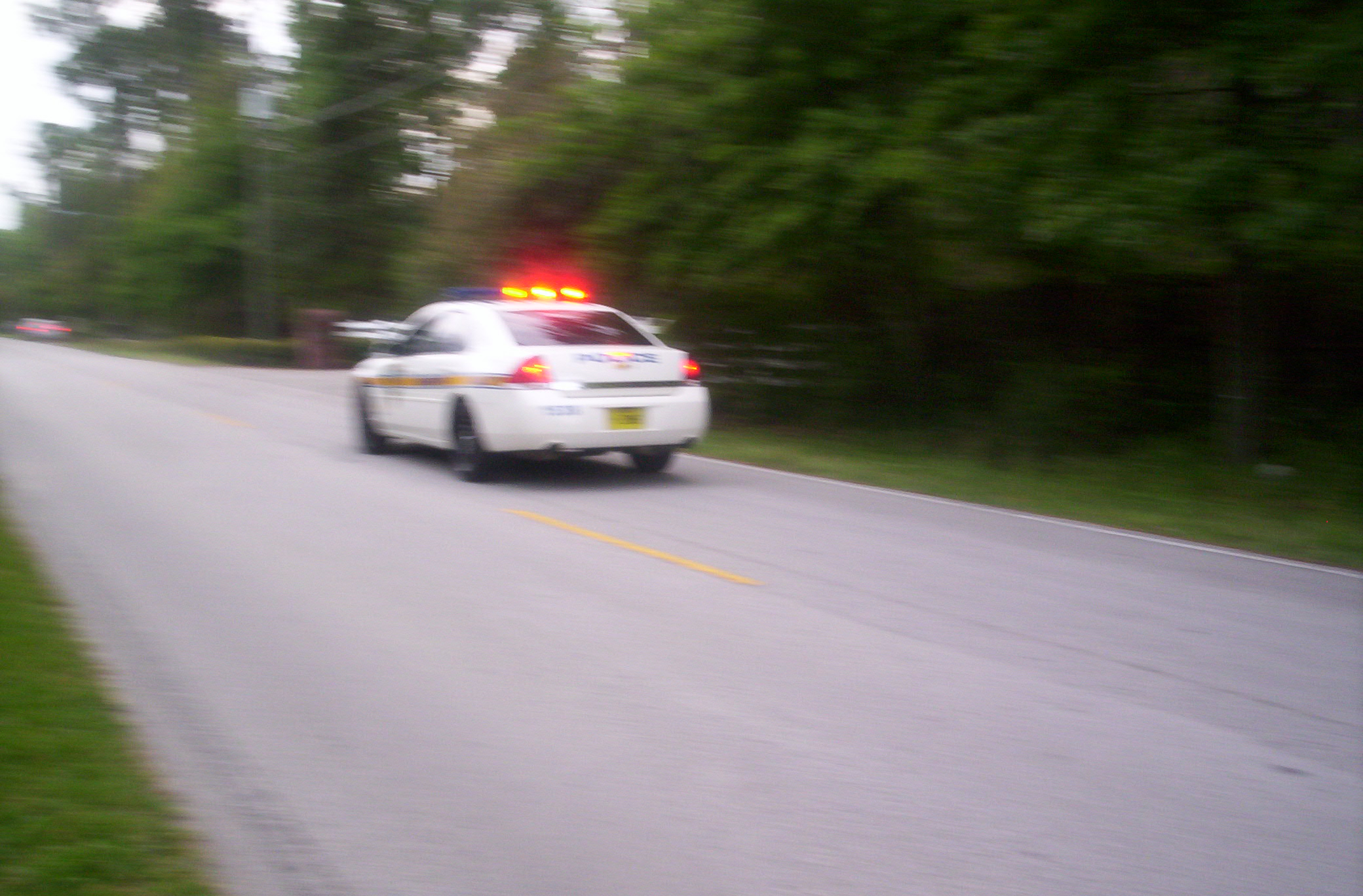
The Jacksonville Sheriff's Office responding to an emergency

The JSO is headed by the sheriff, a Florida constitutional officer elected to a four-year term. By virtue of Jacksonville's consolidated city-county status, the sheriff combines the functions of police chief of Jacksonville and sheriff of Duval County. He is one of the few popularly elected police chiefs in the country.

The sheriff appoints his own senior staff, from undersheriff to commanders. All sworn members of the JSO are sworn in by the sheriff and are considered under the Florida constitution as his/her deputies. All sworn members of the JSO are law enforcement officers (LEO) or correctional officers with all powers allowed by state law to carry firearms and make arrest. JSO also employs community service officers, who are unsworn personnel that respond to primarily traffic-related incidents not requiring the full police powers of a sworn officer.

The Sheriff's Office is divided into five departments, each sub-divided into divisions, sections, units, and squads. Each department is commanded by a director with the rank of director of a department. Each division is commanded by a division chief; each section is headed by a Commander (formerly Assistant Chief). The departments are organized as follows:

=== Department of Patrol & Enforcement ===
There are three divisions in this department, and it is headed by the Director of Patrol and Enforcement.

==== Patrol Division ====
This division is commanded by the Chief of Patrol who oversees the six patrol zones, each headed by a District Commander.

Jacksonville Police Districts

- District 1: Downtown, Springfield, Eastside, San Marco, Riverside
- District 2: Arlington, Intercoastal West
- District 3: Southside, Mandarin, E-Town
- District 4: Avondale, Ortega, Westside, Argyle
- District 5: Northwest, New Town, Baldwin
- District 6: Northside, San Mateo, Oceanway

==== Patrol Support Division ====
This division is commanded by the Chief of Patrol Support.

- Community Engagement Section – Commander
  - Crime Prevention, International Affairs, Sheriff's Watch, Blight Abatement, Tele-Serv, Police Athletic League
- Specialized Patrol Section – Commander
  - Aviation, Canine, Mounted, Civil Process, Risk Protection, Offender Tracking, Felony Registration, Police Auxiliary, Traffic Enforcement, DUI Enforcement, Motors Squad

==== Special Events Division ====
This division is commanded by the Chief of Special Events.

- Special Events Section – Commander
  - Special Events, Secondary Employment, Emergency Preparedness, Honor Guard, Mobile Field Force

=== Department of Investigations & Homeland Security ===
There are two divisions in this department, and it is headed by the Director of Investigations & Homeland Security.

==== Investigation Division ====
This division is commanded by the Chief of Investigation.

- Property Crimes Section – Commander
  - Auto Crimes Unit – The Auto Crimes Unit handles auto theft and auto burglary investigations, many of which result in civil disputes. The unit also investigates thefts of marine craft, all terrain vehicles, motorcycles and aircraft.
  - Traffic Homicide Unit – The Traffic Homicide Unit is responsible for investigating traffic fatalities, and hit and run crashes with serious bodily injury. They operate under the supervision of the Auto Crimes Unit commander.
  - Polygraph Unit – The Polygraph Unit is staffed by polygraphists who administer polygraph examinations to suspects, victims, and witnesses involved in criminal investigations. They also administer polygraph examinations for police and other job applicants as part of their background investigation process.
  - Economic Crimes – The Economic Crimes Unit investigates forgeries, frauds, including Internet fraud, bank fraud and credit card fraud, along with identity theft, con games, and other economic crimes.
  - Crime Scene Unit – The Crime Scene Unit is staffed by evidence technicians.
  - Latent Print Unit – The Latent Print Unit is staffed by latent print examiners who play a vital role in the investigation, identification, and conviction of criminal offenders.
  - Photo Lab – The Photo Lab is staffed by police photographers who are responsible for processing, printing and maintaining all crime scene photographs.
- Major Case Section – Commander
  - Homicide Unit – The Homicide Unit handles current cases while one team handles cold case investigations. The "hot" teams investigate cases such as murder, manslaughter, suicide, accidental death (except traffic crashes), in‑custody deaths, any death of a suspicious or undetermined nature or a death in which a doctor will not sign the death certificate as well as any incident (except traffic crashes) resulting in life-threatening injury. The homicide unit also investigates officer involved shooting incidents, no matter how serious the injury, and incidents when an officer has been shot or seriously injured.
  - Cold Case Unit – The Cold Case Team reviews all requests for an investigation, provided the original detective, or reassigned detective is no longer in the Homicide Unit and there is no other active ongoing investigation.
  - Missing Persons Unit – The Missing Persons Unit is under the direction of the Homicide Unit commander.
  - Robbery Unit – Detectives are tasked with the investigation of the crimes of armed robbery, unarmed or "strong-arm" robbery, home-invasion robbery, carjacking, and a relatively new Florida statute covering the crime of "robbery by sudden snatching." Additionally, the Robbery Unit oversees the enforcement of the Jacksonville Business Security Code and the Florida Convenience Business Security Act.
  - Specialized Investigations Unit – Detectives in the Special Investigations Unit (formerly known as Sex Crimes) are tasked with the investigation of all felony sexual assaults, as well as crimes involving child pornography and lewd and lascivious acts. They also investigate incidents of child abuse, child neglect, domestic violence, elderly abuse, elderly neglect and financial exploitation of the elderly.
  - Victim Services Coordinator – The Victim Services Coordinators provide assistance to all crime victims, witnesses, survivors, and their significant others. The coordinator also provides short-term crisis intervention and counseling for law enforcement.
- Violence Reduction Section – Commander
  - Community Problem Response Unit – Officers assigned to this unit (commonly referred to as "CPR") conduct proactive street-level investigations in support of other investigative units and in response to crime patterns.
  - Gang Investigations Unit – The Gang Unit investigates and monitors known criminal street gangs and validated gang members who commit crimes within the city of Jacksonville.
  - Violent Crimes Unit – Detectives assigned to the Violent Crimes Unit investigate felony level battery crimes, such as shootings (where no death has occurred), drive-by shootings, shootings into occupied dwellings, and other aggravated assaults.

==== Homeland Security Division ====
This division is commanded by the Chief of Homeland Security.

- Special Operations Section – Commander
  - SWAT, Bomb Squad, Marine Unit, Dive Team, Intelligence Unit, Crisis Negotiators, Unmanned Aerial Systems, CISM, Critical Infrastructures, Fusion Center
- Narcotics/Vice Section – Commander
  - Major Case & Mid-level Narcotics Units, Pharmaceutical & Designer Drug, Overdose Death Investigations, Clandestine Lab, Street Level Narcotics, Vice Squad, DART, Technical Support, Computer Forensics, Internet Crimes Against Children, Warehouse, Forfeiture Unit

=== Department of Police Services ===
There are two divisions in this department, and it is headed by the Director of Police Services.

==== Support Services Division ====
This division is commanded by the Chief of Support Services.

- Information Systems Management Section – Commander
  - Infrastructure, Support Services, Software Services
- Communications Section – Commander
  - 911 Administration, Communications Center, Communications Technology, Property & Evidence
- General Support Section – Commander
  - Fleet Management, Identification, Public Records Requests, Records, Police Memorial Building Security, Facility Management, Supply & Mail, Copy Center

==== Budget Division ====
This division is commanded by the Chief of Budget.

  - Financial Analysis, Grants, Procurement, Trust Funds

=== Department of Personnel & Professional Standards ===
There are two divisions in this department commanded by the Director of Personnel & Professional Standards.

==== Human Resources Division ====
This division is commanded by the Chief of Human Resources.

  - Critical Incident Stress Management, Sworn Recruitment & Inspections, Peer Support, Member Chaplaincy Services
- Personnel Services Section – Executive
  - Occupational Health & Wellness, I/O Psychology & Civilian Recruitment, Payroll & HR Data Reporting, Sworn Onboarding, Position Management & Civilian Onboarding

==== Professional Standards Division ====
This division is commanded by the Chief of Professional Standards.

  - Internal Audits
- Public Accountability Section – Commander
  - Accreditation, Inspections & Written Directives, Internal Affairs unit, Professional Oversight Unit, Public Relations & Information, Body-Worn Cameras
- Training Section – Commander
  - Field Training, Gun Range, Leadership Development Institute, Training Academy
- Strategic Communications Section – Executive

=== Department of Corrections ===
The Department of Corrections has more than 600 state-certified corrections officers and civilian personnel with three correctional facilities in Duval County. The largest is the John E. Goode Pretrial Detention Facility (PDF), constructed in 1990 and located in downtown Jacksonville. It is a thirteen-story building with a capacity of over 2,200. The others are the Montgomery Correctional Center (MCC) and the Community Transitions Center (CTC).

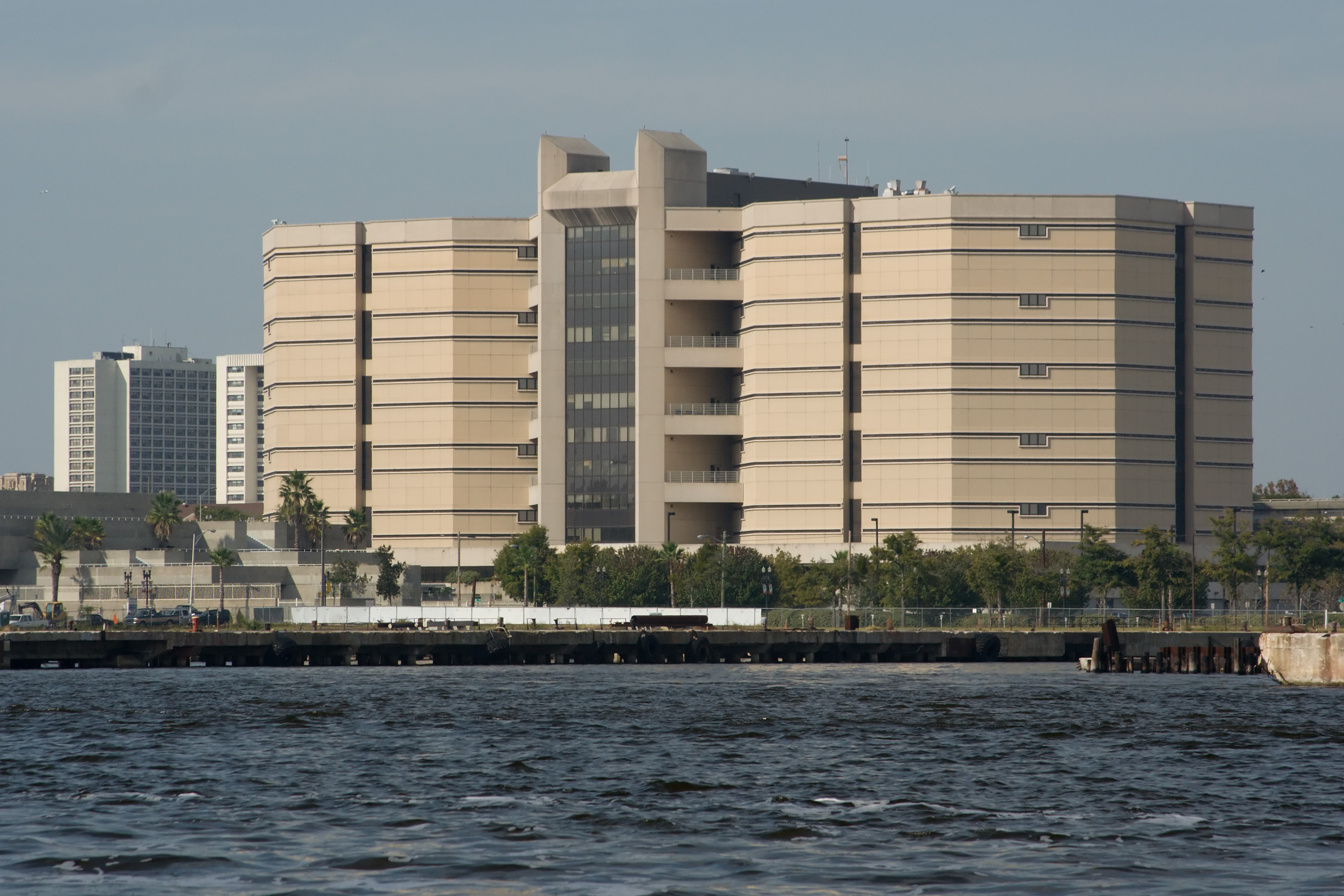
John E. Goode Pretrial Detention Center

There are three divisions within this department, and it is headed by the Director of Corrections.

==== Jails Division ====
This division is commanded by the Chief of Jails

- Pretrial Detention Facility Custody & Housing Section – Commander
  - Housing, Special Projects
- Pretrial Detention Facility Processing & Special Projects Section – Commander
  - Classification, Processing
- Pretrial Detention Facility Support Services Section – Commander
  - Facility Management, Inmate Services, Special Operations, Transport & Services, Technology
- Court Services Section – Major
  - Court side, Holding Side

==== Prisons Division ====
This division is commanded by the Chief of Prisons

- Community Transition Center – Commander
  - Services, Watch Operations
- Montgomery Correctional Center – Commander
  - Security, Services, Watch Operations

==== Programs & Transitional Services Division ====
This division is commanded by the Chief of Programs & Transitional Services

  - Corrections Chaplaincy & Interfaith Services, Electronic Monitoring, Inmate Programs, Jacksonville Reentry Center, Misdemeanor Probation Program, Pretrial Services & Court Diversionary Programs

==== Montgomery Correctional Center ====
The City Prison Farm (P-Farm) was started in 1958 on a large, 640-acre (2.6 km2) tract in the northwestern Duval County, Florida.

With the consolidation of the city of Jacksonville in 1968, the City Prison Farm was renamed as the Jacksonville Correctional Institution. James I. Montgomery was facility director from 1947–1986 and the Jacksonville Correctional Institution was renamed the Montgomery Correctional Center in 1986.

==== Goode Pretrial Detention Facility ====
Duval County had longstanding problems with incarceration overcrowding dating back to the 1950s. To address the problem, the county tried various programs of pretrial release including notice to appear, release on own recognizance, surety bonds, signature bonds, cash bonds, and jail sweeps for mass release. They even renovated an unused juvenile shelter to house the overflow.

Sixteen years of research, development and planning culminated in the opening of the John E. Goode Pretrial Detention Facility in 1991.

In 1991, it was the nation's fifth-largest jail.

Over 1,700 inmates from seven different facilities were transported to the new facility and it served the county well. Over the next thirty years, the number of inmates grew with the city's growth and overcrowding again became a problem. There was no room for expansion downtown. The city began about constructing a new jail elsewhere and possible uses for the Police Memorial Building when the department vacates it. Mayor Donna Deegan proposed "beyond five-year" police projects. The first was a 3,000-bed jail on the Northside near the Montgomery Correctional Center at $244 million. The second was a 500-bed jail somewhere downtown for inmates making court appearances at $41 million. The third was for a new Police Memorial Building costing $96 million.

The City Council allocated $9 million in 2024 for infrastructure improvements that should extend five years to the lifespan of Goode while planning continues for a new facility. Following the headquarters move to Florida Blue, the Police Memorial Building might be utilized as on-site infirmary for the Goode Pretrial Detention Center. A mental health facility could also be included to support both correctional officers and incarcerated individuals.

==== Community Transition Center ====
The CTC houses both male and female sentenced inmates who participate in either the Substance Abuse Treatment program at Matrix House or a Work Furlough program. Additional inmates are assigned there who work at the facility.

== Rank structure ==
Insignia	Rank
	Sheriff
	Undersheriff
	Director
	Chief
	Commander (formerly Assistant Chief)
	Major (Courts/Services only)
	Captain (Auxiliary only)
	Lieutenant
	Master Sergeant
	Senior Sergeant
	Sergeant
	Master Officer / Community Service Corporal/Police Emergency Communications Officer II (Dispatcher)
	Senior Officer/Police Emergency Communications Officer I (Receiving Officer)
[no rank insignia]	Officer / Detective

== Alleged Misconduct ==
- On 31 January 1925, a local Black man, Willie Washington, was murdered by a Jacksonville detective. His body was put on display in the county courthouse. Hundreds came to view and jeer at his body.
- The Brenton Butler case involved a 2000 murder investigation in which a 15-year-old Black male was arrested and charged with the crime. At trial, he claimed his confession was coerced after he was threatened and brutalized by detectives. The jury acquitted him after less than an hour's deliberation. Two other individuals were later convicted of the crime. The grand jury investigation criticized the prosecutor and police for their handling of the case, but found no evidence of criminal wrongdoing.
- In January 2003, former officers Aric Sinclair, Jason Pough, Reginald Bones, and Karl Waldon were sentenced to federal prison terms for their crimes that included robbery of cash and drugs, kidnapping, and murder over three years in the late 1990s.
- In April 2016, patrol officer Adam Boyd was arrested for grand theft, petty theft, and official misconduct for billing secondary employment that he wasn't actually working. In May 2016, it was revealed that a JSO Internal Affairs investigation sustained a sexual battery charge against Boyd.
- Following a car chase in May 2016, officer Tyler Landreville fired his gun five times at Vernell Bing Jr., killing him. Bing was unarmed.
- In August 2020, a federal judge ordered JSO to pay $100,000 to four protesters who were assaulted and arrested by JSO officers during a Black Lives Matter protest that took place in downtown Jacksonville in May 2020.
- In April 2021, officer Alexander Grant was arrested for misdemeanor battery after assaulting a handcuffed person already in police custody.
- In October 2021, officer Matthew Butler was sentenced to 20 years in Florida State Prison after pleading guilty to two counts of Attempted Capital Sexual Battery. Both counts involved Butler committing sexual acts against a minor.
- In November 2022, Dexter Barry spent a two-day stint in the Duval County jail during which he did not have access to critical anti-rejection medication that he, as a heart transplant recipient, was supposed to take multiple times per day. Police footage showed Barry repeatedly informer officers of his health condition. Three days after being released, Barry died of cardiac arrest brought on by an autoimmune rejection. The National Commission on Correctional Health Care found that the medical care provided by the jail was deficient and that staffing was critically low. Barry's family later settled a federal lawsuit over his death.
- In January 2023, JSO officer Cecil Grant was arrested on a third-degree felony charge of official misconduct after arresting a man with no probable cause and providing inaccurate information on a written arrest report which contradicted his body cam footage.
- In September 2023, JSO officer Alejandro Carmona-Fonseca was sentenced to 11 years and 8 months in federal prison for attempted online enticement of a minor to engage in sexual activity.
- On September 29, 2023, Le'Keian Woods was tased and physically assaulted by three JSO officers during a traffic stop. Woods later filed a federal suit against the officers involved, accusing the officers of excessive force.
- In April 2024, officer Jordan Weiss was arrested for one count of official misconduct, one count of misdemeanor battery, and one third-degree felony after pepper spraying and beating an inmate at the Duval County Jail multiple times. According to JSO Undersheriff Shawn Coarsey, the inmate was not resisting Weiss at the time of the alleged assault.
- In April 2024, former JSO corrections officer Kobe Collett was arrested after being charged with money laundering, unlawful compensation for official behavior, introduction and possession of contraband in a county detention facility, and three counts of criminal conspiracy for his role in a jail drug smuggling operation.
- In April 2024, former officer John Burr was arrested for leaving the scene of a crash following injury, a third-degree felony. Burr was driving his marked patrol vehicle when he hit a stopped vehicle, injuring the driver before fleeing the scene.
- In May 2024, former officer Allen LeSage was arrested on a third-degree felony charge relating to use of a police database for personal reasons, running 15 license plate numbers for vehicles parked at the apartment complex at which his ex-girlfriend lived.
- In October 2024, former officer John Burgos was arrested on charges of false imprisonment and battery causing bodily harm after an alleged incident related to Burgos' actions in his response to a domestic violence call. In February 2025, Burgos was again arrested, this time on federal charges related to the attempted production of child pornography.
- In November 2024, former JSO Gang Unit detective Josue Garriga was sentenced to 24 years and 4 months in federal prison after being found guilty for the sexual exploitation of a minor.
- In December 2024, officer Mindy Cardwell accidentally shot Jason Arrington in the leg with his own firearm while attempting to remove it from his holster on his waist. Arrington had been pulled over for running a red light, had been told to exit the vehicle, and was cooperating with officers when Cardwell accidentally discharged Arrington's firearm. In May 2025, Cardwell was fired after an internal investigation determined the incident was a result of a sustained charge of incompetence.
- In April 2025, Duval County Jail inmate Charles Faggart died following a physical altercation while in custody. Nine correctional officers involved in the incident were later stripped of corrections authority. An investigation of the incident is currently underway in which Faggart's medical records contradict JSO's accounting of the incident.
- In November 2025, officer Jacob Cahill shot an unarmed 14-year old child in the back. Body camera footage showed Officer Cahill ordering the child to remove his hands from his pants, then immediately opening fire.
- In January 2026, JSO Corrections Officer Taaron Clayton and JSO Police Officer Nicholas Hicks were arrested, with Clayton facing sexual battery charges and Hicks facing charges of grand theft and official misconduct.

== See also ==
- Montgomery Correctional Center
- List of law enforcement agencies in Florida
- List of U.S. state and local law enforcement agencies
- Brenton Butler case, a 2000 case of false confession
