= Mark Mahon (politician) =

American politician

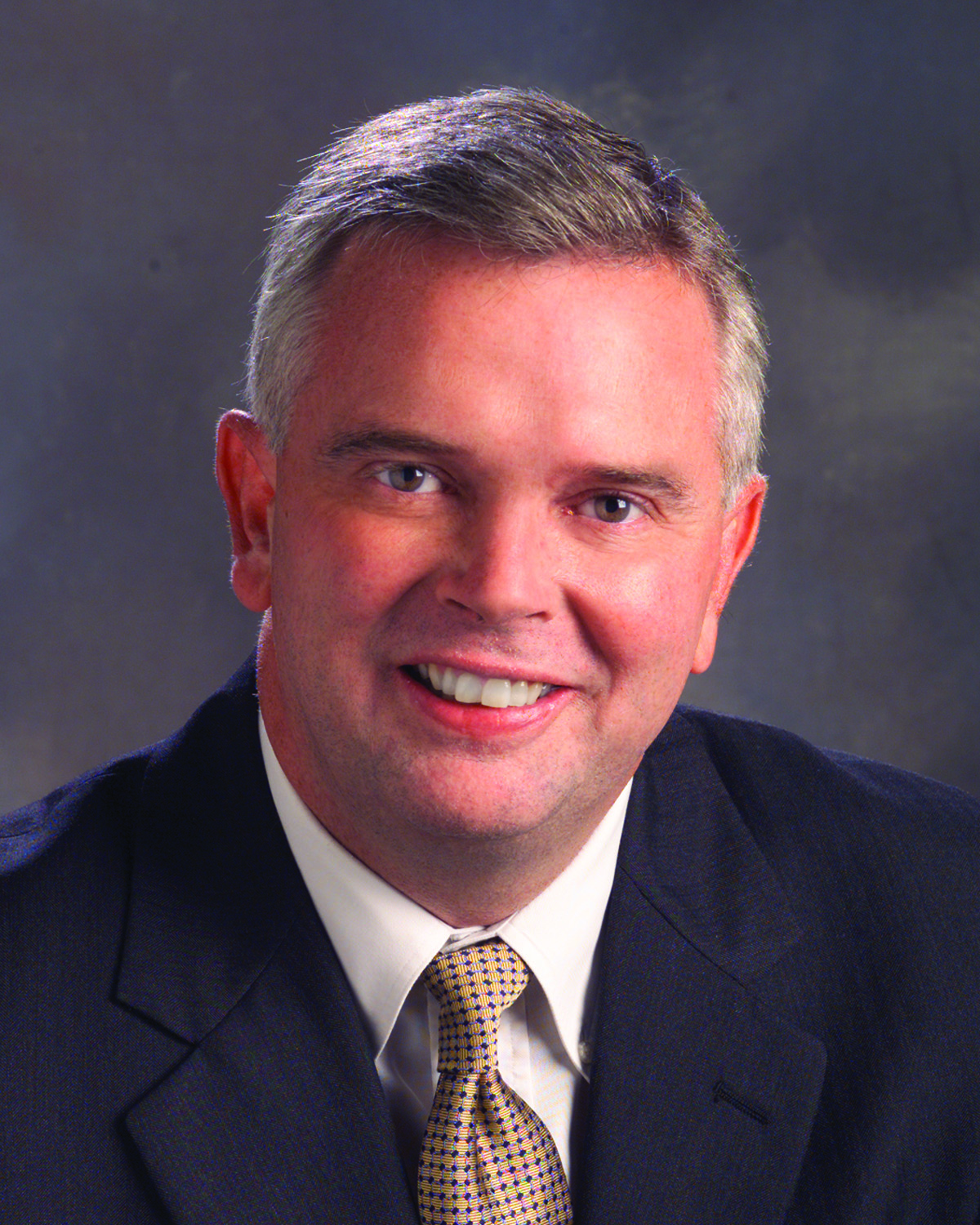

Judge of the Fourth Judicial Circuit Court of Florida
- Incumbent
- Assumed office June 29, 2007
- Preceded by: A.C. Soud

Member of the Florida House of Representatives from the 16th district
- In office November 7, 2000 – June 29, 2007
- Preceded by: James B. Fuller
- Succeeded by: Charles McBurney

Personal details
- Born: April 8, 1957 (age 69)
- Party: Republican
- Spouse: Mary Ciccone
- Education: Florida State University (BS, JD)
- Profession: Judge in 4th Judicial Circuit

Mark Mahon (born April 8, 1957) is a former Representative in the House of Representatives of the U.S. state of Florida. As of July 2015, he is the Chief Judge of Florida's 4th Circuit Court. He resides in Jacksonville, Florida.

Mahon received his bachelor's degree from the Florida State University in 1978. In addition, he received his Juris Doctor from Florida State University in 1981. In 2007, he was appointed by governor Charlie Crist as a circuit judge for the 4th Judicial Circuit of Jacksonville, Florida. This ended his term as a Representative of the 16th District of Florida.

== Controversy ==
After becoming Interim Chief Judge of Florida's 4th Circuit Court based in Jacksonville, on July 1, 2015, Mahon issued a Summary Order prohibiting photography in public places, criticism of the court and specifically "speech that ‘degrade[s] or call[s] into question the integrity’ of judges on courthouse sidewalks" of the Duval County Courthouse, a move that was denounced by lawyers and activists as unconstitutional due to violation of the First Amendment. On July 7, Mahon altered his order to drop speech prohibitions but retain prohibitions on photography from public sidewalks. On the same day, PINAC and local activists filed federal lawsuit against Mahon's order, alleging prior restraint of free speech. On July 15, Mahon rescinded the order completely after increasing media attention and criticism.
