= T. K. Waters =

American police officer & politician (born 1970)

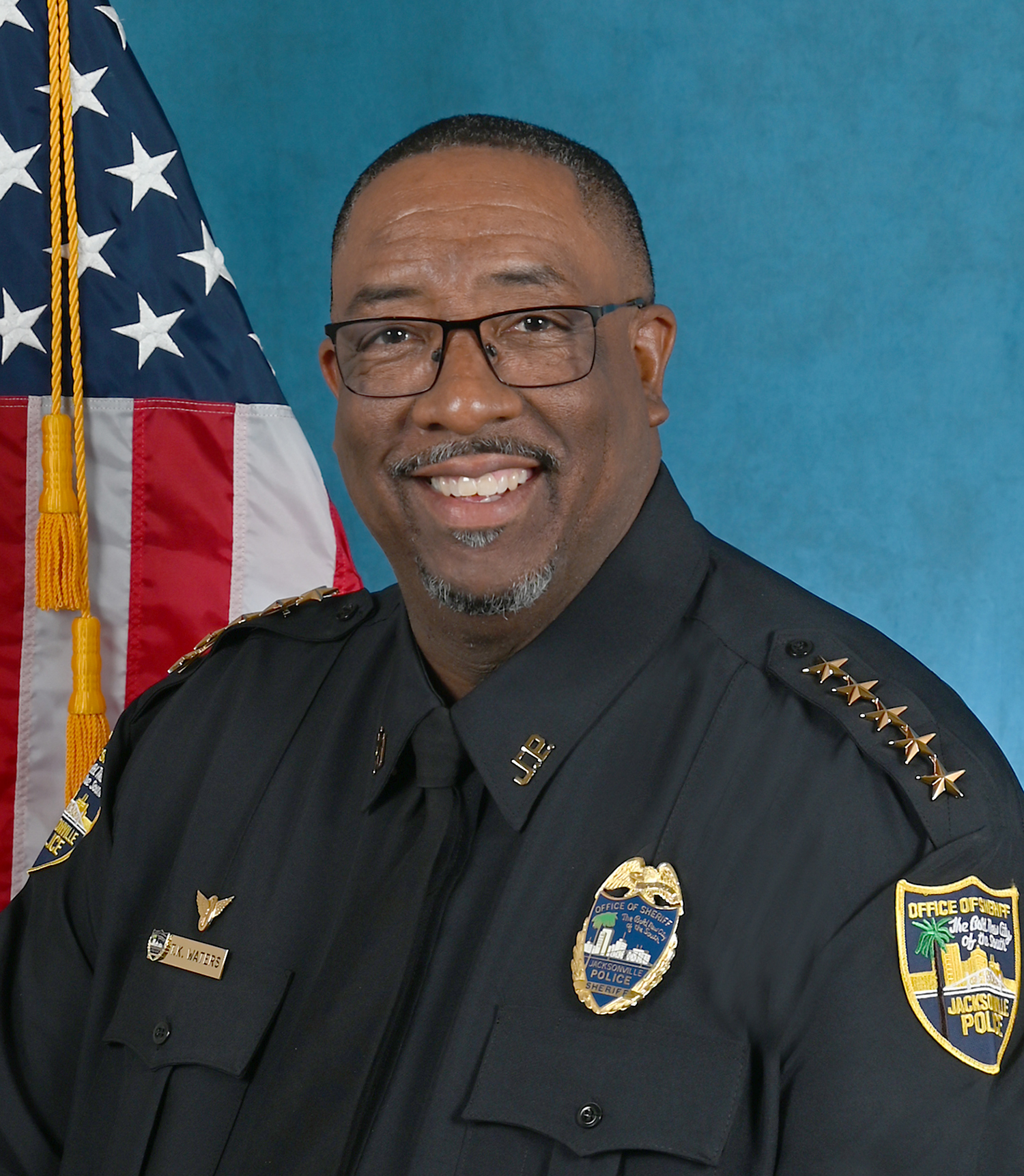
- JSO Official portrait

7th Sheriff of Jacksonville
- Incumbent
- Assumed office November 20, 2022
- Preceded by: Pat Ivey

Personal details
- Born: Thomas Kevin Waters; December 8, 1970 (age 55) Fort Bliss, Texas, U.S.
- Party: Republican
- Spouse: Robin Brown (m. 1998)
- Children: 3
- Education: Liberty University (BS)
- Occupation: Law enforcement officer; politician
- Website: Official website
- Police career
- Allegiance: Duval County
- Department: Jacksonville Sheriff's Office
- Service years: 1991–present
- Rank: Sheriff

Thomas Kevin Waters (born December 8, 1970) is an American law enforcement officer and politician serving as the 7th sheriff of Jacksonville since 2022. A member of the Republican Party, he is one of five Black sheriffs currently serving in the state of Florida, as of 2025. In February 2025 Waters was appointed to the new State Immigration Enforcement Council.

== Life and education ==
Waters was born at the William Beaumont Army Medical Center at Fort Bliss in Texas. His father served in the United States Army as a Command Sergeant Major, so he grew up as a military brat with his family stationed at several bases. After graduating from the Würzburg American High School in Germany, he earned a Bachelor of Science from Liberty University. He majored in Interdisciplinary Studies; Homeland security was his minor. Due to his father's service, Waters planned to join the Marines but changed his mind when a cousin was killed in 1990 during a robbery in the Ramona neighborhood of Jacksonville.

== Law enforcement career ==
Waters joined the Jacksonville Sheriff's Office in 1991 as a corrections officer. He graduated from the Police academy in 1993 and became a patrol officer.
1991 – 1993 Corrections officer
1993 – 1996 Patrol officer
1996 – 1998 Narcotics Officer/Detective
1998 – 2001 Patrol, Task Force, Traffic Officer
2001 – 2002 Sergeant Patrol
2002 – 2005 Sergeant Traffic Enforcement
2005 – 2015 Sergeant Homicide
2015 – 2019 Assistant Chief
2019 – 2022 Chief of Investigations

Waters retired from JSO with over 30 years of service in July 2022 in order to run for sheriff of the Jacksonville Sheriff's Office.

== Election ==
Mike Williams served as Jacksonville sheriff from 2015 until his retirement in June 2022 after local news reported that Williams no longer resided in Duval County as required by city charter. Florida Governor DeSantis appointed undersheriff Pat Ivey as interim sheriff until a special election could be held. Ivey declined to be a candidate in the election and no one received more than 50% of the vote, so a runoff was held coinciding with the regularly scheduled elections in Florida. T.K. Waters ultimately won the race with 55% of the vote compared to Lakesha Burton's 45%. Waters was sworn in on Sunday, November 20, 2022. Sheriff Williams' original term ended in 2023 and Waters was unopposed in the spring 2023 election.
