= John Rutherford (Florida politician) =

American politician (born 1952)

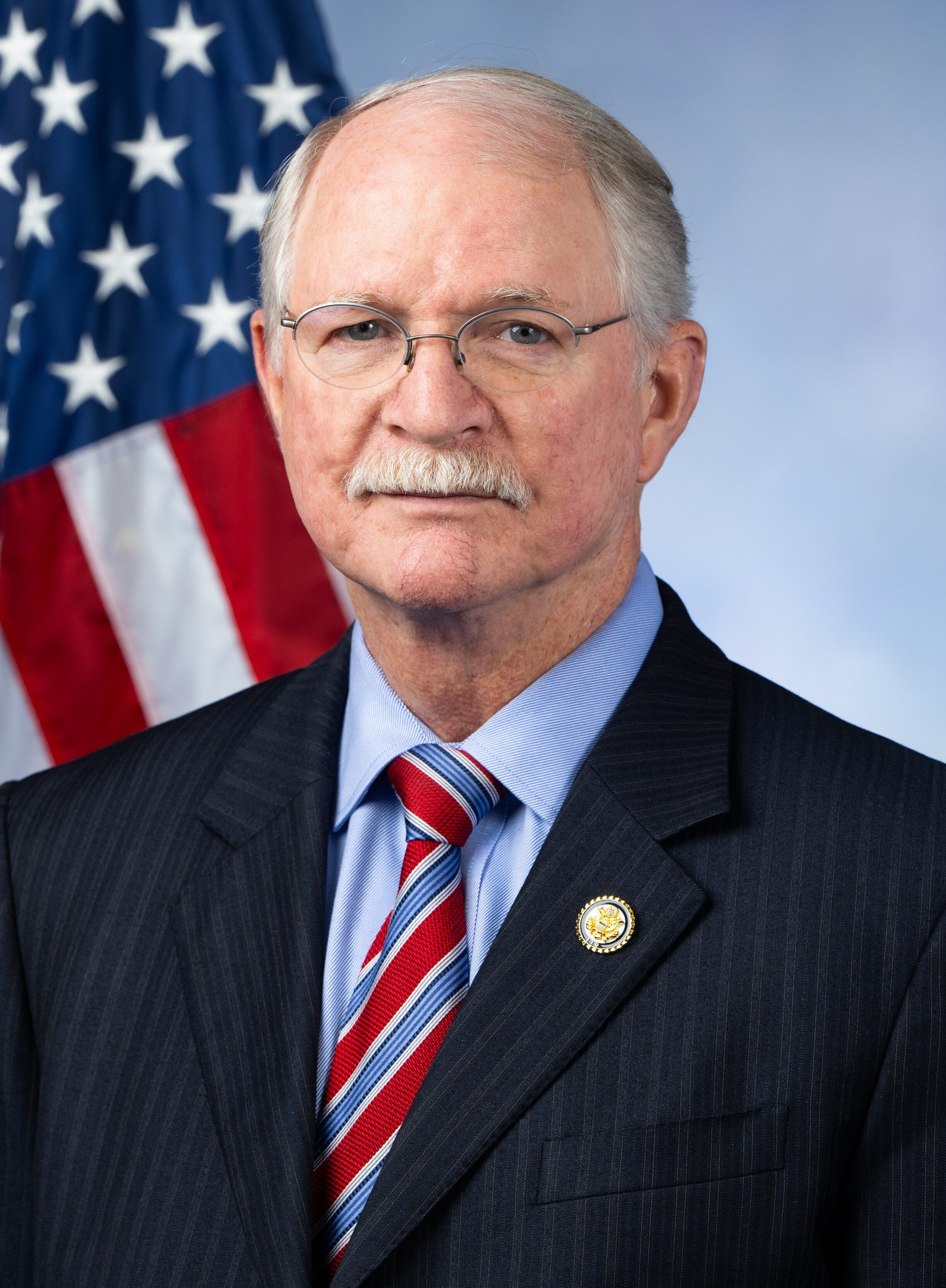

Member of the U.S. House of Representatives from Florida
- Incumbent
- Assumed office January 3, 2017
- Preceded by: Ander Crenshaw
- Constituency: 4th district (2017–2023); 5th district (2023–present)

4th Sheriff of Jacksonville
- In office July 1, 2003 – July 1, 2015
- Preceded by: Nat Glover
- Succeeded by: Mike Williams

Personal details
- Born: John Henry Rutherford; September 2, 1952 (age 74) Omaha, Nebraska, U.S.
- Party: Republican
- Spouse: Patricia Rutherford (m. 1972)
- Children: 2
- Education: Florida State College at Jacksonville (AS); Florida State University (BS)
- Website: House website Campaign website

John Henry Rutherford (/ˈrʌðərfərd/; born September 2, 1952) is an American politician and former law enforcement officer serving as the U.S. representative from Florida's 5th congressional district since 2017. A member of the Republican Party, his district encompasses southeast Jacksonville and all of St. Johns County.

Rutherford was an officer with the Jacksonville Sheriff's Office for four decades, before being elected Duval County sheriff in 2003; he remained in that post until 2015. In 2016, he ran for the House of Representatives in what was at the time Florida's 4th congressional district. He won the election and was reelected in 2018, 2020, 2022 and 2024.

== Early life and education ==
John Rutherford was born in Omaha, Nebraska, in 1952. His father was in the U.S. Navy and was serving in Korea at the time of his son's birth. In the 1950s, Rutherford's family moved to Jacksonville, Florida. He graduated from Nathan Bedford Forest High School in 1970. He surfed in his free time. In 1972, he earned his Associate of Science in criminology from Florida State College at Jacksonville, formerly Florida Junior College, followed by his Bachelor of Science in criminology from Florida State University in 1974.

== Jacksonville Sheriff's Office ==
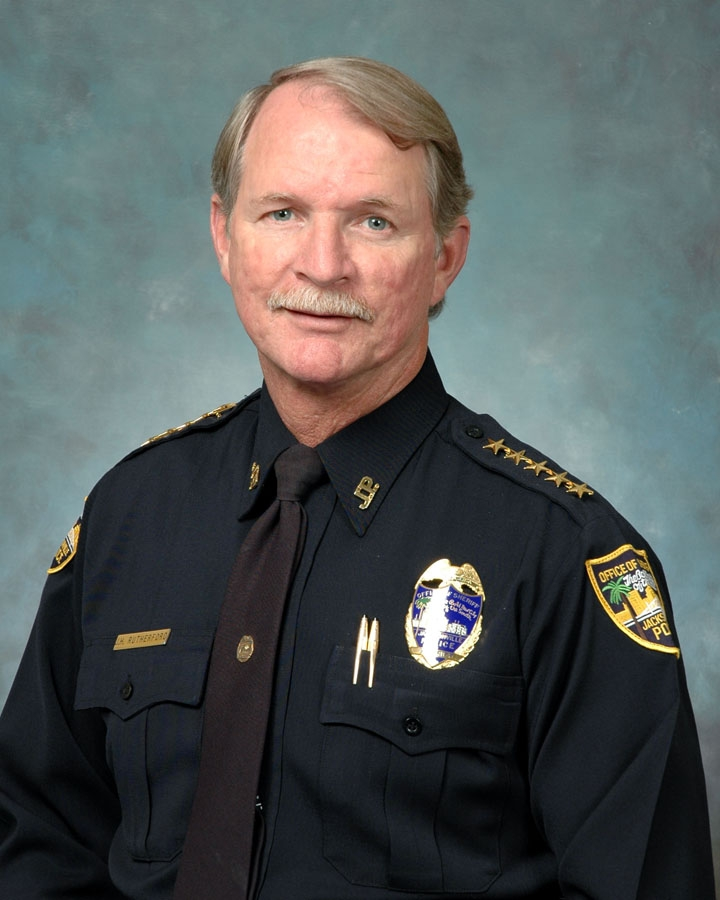
Rutherford as Jacksonville sheriff

Rutherford spent 41 years at the Jacksonville Sheriff's Office, first as a sheriff's deputy and for the final 12 years as the elected sheriff. He joined the Jacksonville Sheriff's Office in 1974 as a patrolman. He was promoted to sergeant in 1980 and ultimately rose to the rank of captain. At various points, he commanded the Arson and Burglary divisions, led the Police Academy, and led patrol units on the Southside. He was also Chief of Services, Traffic and Special Operations, and Chief of Patrol. He was appointed director of corrections in 1995 by then-Sheriff Nat Glover. In that role, he was responsible for overseeing the jail.

Rutherford ran for Jacksonville Sheriff in 2003. A candidate for the Jacksonville City Council filed a complaint against Rutherford in February, alleging violations of the Federal Hatch Act of 1939, which prohibits employees working for federally funded agencies from running for office in partisan elections. Rutherford said that a lawyer had told him there was no conflict, but he retired in March 2003 anyway, in order to remove any doubt, with 28 years of service.

The Florida Times-Union reported in 2015, "Supporters and even those who criticize him say Rutherford has been steadfast and unwavering in his faith and his convictions as a lawman, a trait some say has brought success while others say is to his detriment." Rutherford's tenure was marked by rises and falls in crime: from 2002 to 2005, Jacksonville suffered an increase in murder and other violent crime; murders briefly declined in 2005, but then rose again each year until 2008, when another decline began. In 2007, the Florida Times-Union endorsed Rutherford for reelection—saying that he was generally moving his department "in a positive direction"—but criticized the pace and inadequacies of key initiatives, such as reducing the murder rate, tackling illegal guns, and initiating a management audit. Overall, the Jacksonville crime rate was about the same at the beginning and end of Rutherford's tenure.

As sheriff, Rutherford was a staunch critic of State Attorney Harry Shorstein and an ally of his successor, Angela Corey. He was credited with improving the sheriff's department's capacities to deal with mental health matters and his oversight of a prisoner reentry program, but was criticized for enduring tensions and a lack of trust between the local African American community and police, as well as a high number of police shootings by the Jacksonville Sheriff's Office. According to a Wall Street Journal report, Jacksonville had the ninth-highest rate of justifiable homicides among the U.S.'s 105 largest police department efforts between 2007 and 2012.

== U.S. House of Representatives ==
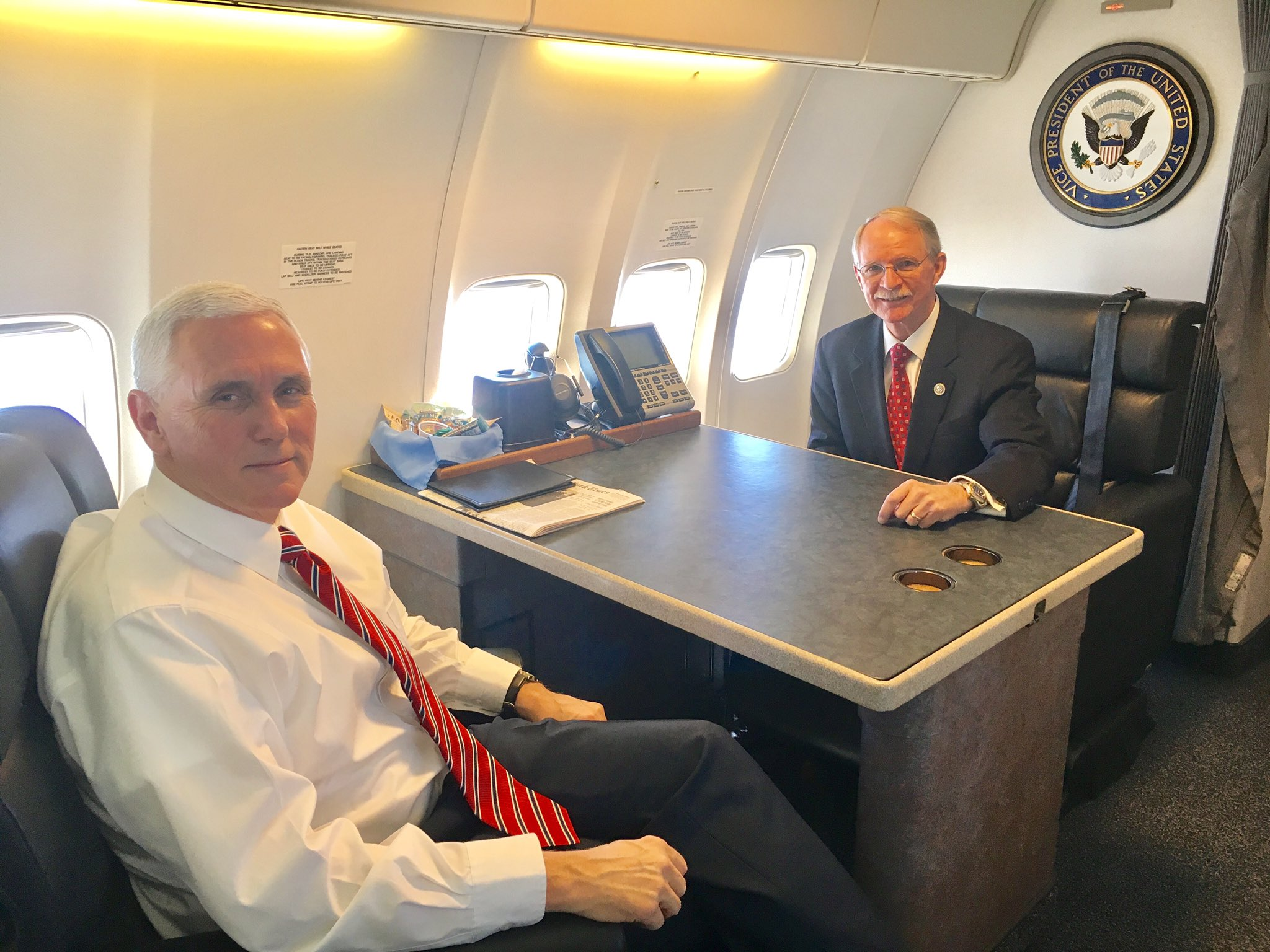
Rutherford meeting with Vice President Mike Pence on board Air Force Two, March 2017

=== Elections ===
==== 2016 ====
After initially considering a run for the state House, Rutherford announced his candidacy for Florida's 4th congressional district on April 15, 2016, for the open seat created by the retirement of the Republican incumbent, Ander Crenshaw. Originally he announced he would run for Florida's 6th congressional district in 2015. Because the 4th district is a Republican safe seat, Rutherford was heavily favored in each election.

In the August 2016 Republican primary, Rutherford faced State Representative Lake Ray, St. Johns County Commissioner Bill McClure and former St. Johns Water Management District executive director Hans Tanzler III. Rutherford won the nomination with 38.7% of the vote, to Ray's 20.1%, Tanzler's 19.0%, and McClure's 9.8%. In the general election, Rutherford defeated Democratic nominee David Bruderly, 70.2% to 27.6%.

==== 2018 ====
In 2018, Rutherford was challenged by Democratic nominee Ges Selmont, a Ponte Vedra Beach attorney. He was reelected, 65.2% to 32.4%.

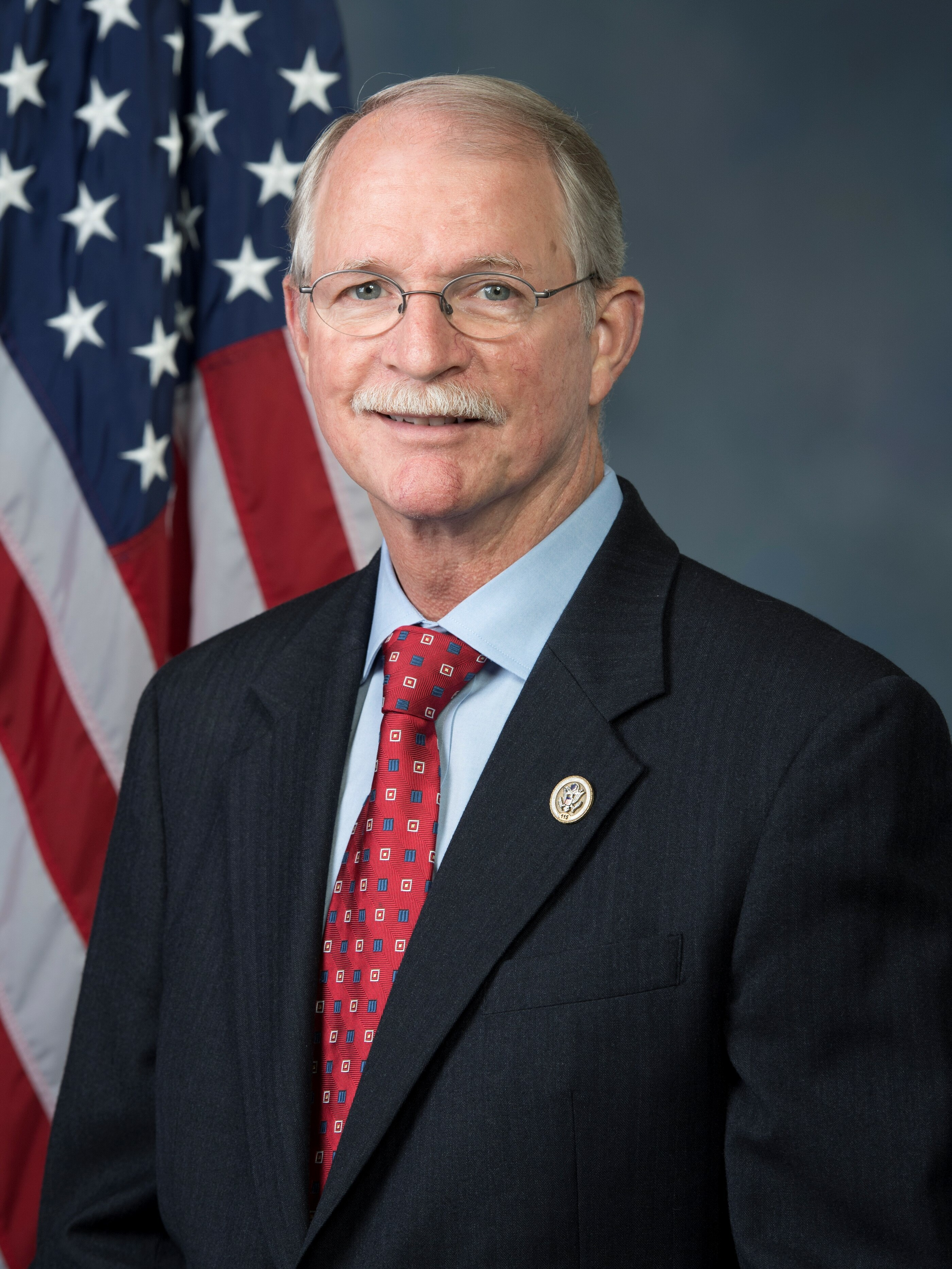
Rutherford during the 115th United States Congress (2017)

==== 2020 ====
In 2020, Rutherford won re-nomination in a low-key Republican primary, defeating retired Navy chief petty officer Erick Aguilar with 80.2% of the vote to Aguilar's 19.8%. In the general election, Rutherford defeated Democratic nominee Donna Deegan, a former local TV anchor and breast cancer awareness advocate, 61.1% to 38.9%.

==== 2022 ====
Rutherford won the Republican primary with 65.6% of the vote. He was uncontested in the general election.

==== 2024 ====
Rutherford ran for re-election in 2024.

=== Tenure ===
On January 11, 2017, Rutherford collapsed on the floor of the House, in what his staffers described as an "acute digestive flareup"; he was taken to the hospital, and released ten days later.

=== Committee assignments ===
For the 118th Congress:

- Committee on Appropriations
  - Subcommittee on Homeland Security
  - Subcommittee on Military Construction, Veterans Affairs, and Related Agencies
  - Subcommittee on Transportation, Housing and Urban Development, and Related Agencies

=== Caucus memberships ===
- Main Street Caucus
- Republican Governance Group
- Congressional NextGen 9-1-1 Caucus
- Congressional Coalition on Adoption
- Rare Disease Caucus

=== Investigation ===
In February 2021, Rutherford joined the House Committee on Ethics. The Office of Congressional Ethics (OCE) board filed a February 2022 report stating that there was "substantial reason to believe" Rutherford had not filed timely disclosure reports as required by federal law and House rules. The House Committee on Ethics released a report on May 31, 2022, indicating that it was investigating one of its members over repeated reporting violations of the STOCK Act, enacted in 2012 to prevent insider trading using non-public information by members of Congress and other government employees. Members of Congress are required to report any stock transaction over $1,000 within 45 days. Violations are subject to a $200 fine. Between January 2017 and December 2021, Rutherford had 157 late reports involving trades worth between $652,000 and $3.5 million. Most were from his first term, but the violations continued thereafter. The OCE report noted an $800 fine payment in November 2021 but asked whether Rutherford had been "properly penalized for his repeated violations of federal law and House rules". The OCE report also said that Rutherford and Jen Bailey, his chief of staff, were uncooperative by refusing to meet and answer questions. The fine for 157 violations would be $31,400. During his time in Congress, Rutherford had "several trainings on his disclosure obligations" for reporting stock transactions, according to the OCE report.

Rutherford initially contended that the stock trades are made by the manager of his IRA, so he should have been exempt from the reporting requirements. One of his lawyers, Kate Belinski, sent the OCE a letter on March 18, 2022, insisting that the late reports were "an entirely inadvertent oversight" based on a "simple misunderstanding of the requirements". She wrote that Rutherford had cooperated by providing the documents OCE requested. Belinski also claimed that Rutherford has a new system to track and file STOCK transactions. Rutherford said, "Everything is done, as far as I know. I paid the fine that they asked for, and I'm done with it."

== Political positions ==
Rutherford aligned himself with President Donald Trump, voting in line with Trump's position 96.6% of the time. He voted against a majority of fellow Republicans approximately 3.9% of the time.

=== Gun policy ===
In 2017, Rutherford signed a letter to the Bureau of Alcohol, Tobacco, Firearms and Explosives expressing his support for legislation to ban bump stocks.

From 2015 to 2016, Rutherford received $1,000 in campaign donations from the NRA Political Victory Fund.

In 2018, Rutherford sponsored a bill, the STOP (Students, Teachers, and Officers Preventing) School Violence Act, that authorized $50 million a year to create a federal grant program "to train students, teachers and law enforcement on how to spot and report signs of gun violence"; the House approved the bill, 407–10. The bill authorized funding for the development of "anonymous telephone and online systems where people could report threats of violence" and $25 million for schools to "improve and harden their security, such as installing new locks, lights, metal detectors and panic buttons." A separate spending bill would be required to provide money for the grant program; Rutherford sought to include such funding as part of an omnibus spending bill.

=== Environment ===
In interviews in 2016 and 2019, he acknowledged the existence of climate change but questioned the scientific consensus that human activity has caused the increase in warming. Rutherford has expressed concern over sea level rise, which would adversely impact St. Augustine. He has criticized the Green New Deal proposal as a "socialist manifesto".

Rutherford and Representative Jeff Van Drew introduced the Atlantic Coastal Economies Protection Act, which would prohibit seismic air gun testing in the Atlantic Ocean. In 2019, in a break with Trump's position, Rutherford voted in favor of legislation to ban offshore drilling along the Atlantic coast, Pacific coast, and eastern Gulf of Mexico coast. In 2019, he introduced bipartisan legislation (cosponsored by eight Florida Democrats and nine Florida Republicans) to extend a moratorium on oil and gas drilling in federal waters off Florida's Gulf Coast until 2029, and to create a similar moratorium on offshore drilling in federal waters off Florida's South Atlantic coast and in the Straits of Florida.

=== Health care ===
Rutherford supported the unsuccessful 2017 effort to repeal the Affordable Care Act. In 2021, he sponsored legislation seeking to block the government from asking passengers on domestic flights whether they had been vaccinated against COVID-19.

=== LGBT rights ===
Rutherford voted against the Equality Act in 2019 and 2021.

=== Policing and criminal justice ===
Being one of two former sheriffs in Congress, Rutherford is "skeptical" of shorter prison sentences for nonviolent drug offenses. During his campaign for Congress, he called Black Lives Matter a "hate group".

Rutherford opposes capital punishment, citing his Catholic faith.

=== Economy, trade, and taxation ===
Rutherford voted for the Tax Cuts and Jobs Act of 2017, a measure he praised as good for the economy.

=== Foreign and military policy ===
Rutherford's district includes two major U.S. Navy bases (Naval Air Station Jacksonville and Naval Station Mayport), and he has pressed issues important to the bases. Like other members of Florida's delegation, he pressed for two squadrons of the F-35 Lightning II to be based with the 125th Fighter Wing of the Florida Air National Guard in Jacksonville.

=== Donald Trump ===
Rutherford defended some of Trump's most controversial statements and actions as president, including his pardon of ex-sheriff Joe Arpaio and his comments after a deadly far-right rally in Charlottesville, Virginia. Rutherford voted against both Trump's first impeachment (in 2019, on articles of obstruction of Congress and abuse of power) and his second impeachment (in 2021, on an article of incitement of insurrection).

==== Effort to overturn 2020 election result ====
Rutherford refused to accept the results of the 2020 presidential election, in which Trump lost to Joe Biden. He echoed Trump's claims of election fraud and suggested that Republican-controlled state legislatures in swing states Biden won could hold a "decertification vote" that would lead to the U.S. House selecting the next president, though he acknowledged that this was unlikely to succeed. On January 7, 2021, after the Capitol was attacked by a pro-Trump mob in an attempted insurrection, Rutherford was one of 138 House Republicans who voted not to count the electoral votes from Arizona and Pennsylvania, despite a number of audits and recounts confirming the election outcome in those states.

In December 2020, Rutherford was one of 126 Republican members of the House of Representatives to sign an amicus brief in support of Texas v. Pennsylvania, a lawsuit filed at the U.S. Supreme Court that sought to overturn the election results. The Supreme Court declined to hear the case on the basis that Texas lacked standing under Article III of the Constitution to challenge the results of an election held by another state.

After Trump was falsely accused of inciting a mob to storm the Capitol over election fraud, Rutherford condemned Representative Liz Cheney for voting to impeach Trump, accusing her of not being a "team player."

=== Immigration ===
In 2018, Rutherford defended the Trump administration policy of separating parents and children at the U.S.-Mexico border, and opposed legislation that would end the practice. After coming under pressure, Trump reversed his policy, a move Rutherford welcomed.

In 2017, Rutherford introduced legislation to create a path to citizenship for holders of E-2 Treaty Investor Visas, a special visa for business owners.

=== Social issues ===
Rutherford opposes abortion. In interviews in 2015, he contended that the U.S. had a "culture of death" he attributed to Roe v. Wade and violent video games and movies.

=== Marijuana ===
Rutherford opposes the legalization of marijuana. He voted against the 2014 ballot initiative to legal medicinal marijuana in Florida, believing that it would ultimately lead to the legalization of recreational marijuana and to marijuana "in every backpack in every high school in Duval County."

=== Veterans ===
Rutherford voted against the Honoring our PACT Act of 2022 which expanded VA benefits to veterans exposed to toxic chemicals during their military service.

=== Other ===
Rutherford has supported the use of earmarks and has called for the elimination or restriction of the U.S. Senate rule that requires 60 Senate votes to invoke cloture (i.e., end debate on bills); he described both proposals as a way to facilitate compromise between the parties and reduce gridlock. Rutherford has said that he supports local referendums to resolve disputes over the fate of public Confederate monuments.

== Elections ==
Rutherford campaigned for Duval County sheriff, running against fellow Republicans David Anderson and Lem Sharp. In the election on April 15, 2003, he received 135,038 votes, 78% of the total. He took office on July 1, 2003. Rutherford was reelected in 2007 and 2011.

On August 30, 2016, he won the Republican primary for Florida's 4th Congressional District.

2016 Florida 4th Congressional District Republican Primary Results
Party	Candidate	Votes	%
Republican	John Rutherford	38,688	38.7%
Republican	Lake Ray	20,111	20.1%
Republican	Hans Tanzler III	18,999	19.0%
Republican	Bill McClure	9,854	9.8%
Republican	Edward Malin	7,879	7.9%
Republican	Stephen Kaufman	2,413	2.4%
Republican	Deborah Katz Pueschel	2,137	2.1%
Total votes		100,081	100

== Personal life ==
Rutherford is married to his wife, Patricia, and has two children and six grandchildren. He and his wife are Roman Catholic.

In 2021, Rutherford became a member of the Sons of the American Revolution (SAR) through his documented descent from Private Julius Rutherford, who served in the Revolutionary War from Virginia.

U.S. House of Representatives
Preceded by Ander Crenshaw	Member of the U.S. House of Representatives from Florida's 4th congressional district 2017–2023	Succeeded by Aaron Bean
Preceded by Al Lawson	Member of the U.S. House of Representatives from Florida's 5th congressional district 2023–present	Incumbent
U.S. order of precedence (ceremonial)
Preceded by Jamie Raskin	United States representatives by seniority 176th	Succeeded by Lloyd Smucker
