= Matthew Shirk =

American lawyer (born 1973)

Matthew A. Shirk
- Born: July 9, 1973 (age 52)
- Education: Western Illinois University (BS); Florida Coastal School of Law (JD)
- Occupation: Lawyer
- Employer: State of Florida
- Title: Public Defender, Fourth Judicial Circuit
- Term: 2009-2016
- Predecessor: Bill White
- Successor: Charlie Cofer
- Political party: Republican

Matthew Aaron Shirk (born July 9, 1973) is an American lawyer who previously served as the public defender for Florida's Fourth Judicial Circuit. He was elected to the position, which covers Clay, Duval, and Nassau Counties, in 2008 and lost re-election in 2016. He is currently under investigation by the Florida Bar for actions while in office. In August 2022 the Florida Supreme Court unanimously approved suspending Shirk from practicing law for one year.

== Early life ==
Shirk graduated from Western Illinois University with a Bachelor of Science degree in 1997, and subsequently moved to Jacksonville, Florida, where he earned a J.D. degree from the Florida Coastal School of Law in 1999. As a law student he interned at the State Attorney's office under the supervision of prosecutor Angela Corey, who was elected State Attorney in 2008. Shirk married Sarah Maria Purdy on March 13, 1999 and was admitted to the Florida Bar on April 12, 2000, and then worked for five years as an Assistant Public Defender (APD) in the Fourth Judicial Circuit Court. After divorcing his first wife, Shirk married Michelle Burney in 2004. The couple have one son. He left the Public Defender's office and was associated with the Jacksonville law firm of Tassone & Eler for almost two years before opening a private practice with William Durden III in November 2006.

== Public Defender ==
In 2008 Shirk, a Republican, ran for Public Defender of Florida's Fourth Judicial Circuit Court. Some commentators criticized Shirk's lack of homicide experience as well as his pledge not to take a confrontational stance with law enforcement if he were elected, in contrast to the typically adversarial relationship between defense attorneys and law enforcement. However, Shirk stressed that his role was to manage the office, not necessarily to be the lead attorney. Shirk won the election 51% to 49% with a margin of 14,246 votes. The win was considered an upset, partly because it was the first time a Republican had run for the office since the state of Florida established the position in 1963.

After winning, Shirk declared he would streamline the office to increase services and reduce costs. The Florida Times-Union was impressed with Shirk's performance in his first year. In a March 18, 2010 editorial, the paper praised his cost-cutting measures, such as introducing videoconferencing to improve staff efficiency and shifting from paper to electronic documents, as well as his community work. According to the Jacksonville Daily Record, Shirks' implementation of videoconferencing saved about $120,000.

Shirk fired ten lawyers in the office, including the defense attorneys in the Brenton Butler case. He hired as his deputy Refik Eler. Eler has defended eight people sentenced to death, more than any other lawyer in Florida. A judge overturned Raymond Morrison's death sentence declaring that Eler's defense was ineffective and that Eler did not properly investigate the case.

Shirk ran for reelection in 2012 and defeated one opponent in the Republican primary; he was unopposed in the general election.

In 2013 Tiffany Ice and Kaylee Chester were fired from the Public Defenders office after a visit from Shirk's wife. This led to the resignation of another employee, by the name of Kelly. It later came to light that Shirk exchanged dozens of text messages with one of the fired female employees. Following that dissension in the Public Defenders office, the incident was investigated by a grand jury which asked him to resign immediately for his activities in that scandal and other reasons. A few of the key conclusions from the grand jury report were that: 1) Shirk fired three women from his office solely to help repair his marriage, 2) Shirk violated local law by offering alcohol in his office, and that 3) Shirk violated attorney-client privilege when he shared details from a conversation he had with Cristian Fernandez with a documentary crew. Among those other factors, was that Shirk redirected funds to pay for an unapproved shower in his office. The grand jury essentially concluded that Shirk embarrassed his office.

Despite the grand jury request that Shirk resign, and that if he did not, the governor should remove him, Governor Rick Scott -through a spokesman- left it up to the voters.

== Suspension from the practice of law ==
Following up on the grand jury report, after Shirk was a public defender, in April 2022 appointed referee Kenneth James Janesk recommended that Shirk be found guilty of violating Florida Bar rules. In August 2022 the Florida Supreme Court unanimously approved suspending Shirk from practicing law for one year.

== Term ==
Legal offices
Preceded by Bill White	Public Defender, 4th Judicial Circuit; 2009–2016	Succeeded by Charlie Cofer
