= Lou Frost =

American lawyer (1931–2008)

- Born: September 19, 1931; New York City, US
- Died: January 16, 2008 (aged 76); Jacksonville, Florida US
- Education: Juris Doctor, University of Florida
- Occupation: Lawyer
- Employer: State of Florida
- Title: Public Defender, Fourth Judicial Circuit
- Term: 1968–2005
- Predecessor: Ed Austin
- Successor: Bill White
- Political party: Democrat

Louis O'Melville "Lou" Frost Jr. (September 19, 1931 – January 16, 2008) was an American lawyer who served for 36 years as the elected public defender for Florida's Fourth Judicial Circuit, which consists of Duval, Nassau, and Clay counties. He was a local legal institution who nurtured the careers of hundreds of young lawyers, with two dozen appointed to state and federal judgeships, and one seated on the Florida Supreme Court.

== Early years ==
Frost was born in New York City, but his family moved to Jacksonville, Florida when he was seven years old. He was a 1949 graduate of Jacksonville's Landon High School, where he was named valedictorian. He received a degree in business from the University of Florida in 1953, the same year he married his wife, Shirley. He attended University of Miami School of Law before serving two years as an officer in the United States Army First Infantry during the Korean War. After leaving the Army, he completed his Juris Doctor degree at the University of Florida College of Law. He was admitted to the Florida Bar on November 6, 1958. and worked briefly in a Jacksonville private practice.

== Career ==
In 1959, then-county solicitor Lacy Mahon Jr. hired Frost as a part-time prosecutor. After Edward M. Booth was elected County Solicitor, he retained Frost on the staff, as well as Ed Austin. Frost first became acquainted with Austin in 1951 at the University of Florida when the former was a student and the latter was a teacher. A few years later, Frost was a First Lieutenant at Fort Sill, Oklahoma when Austin attended Officer Candidate School. They also attended law school together.

In the 1963 Gideon v. Wainwright decision, the U.S. Supreme Court ruled that defendants charged with felonies (besides murder) were also entitled to legal representation by the State. In response, the Florida Legislature established the office of Public Defender, and Governor Farris Bryant appointed Ed Austin as Jacksonville's first public defender.

Austin asked Frost if he would be interested in changing sides. Frost said "yes" and he became Austin's chief assistant. Frost commented,

I never got a big bang out of putting people in jail. I always felt there was some good in every person – even though you had to find it in some of them. I also had prosecuted many people who didn’t have representation and I knew their sentences would have been more lenient if they could have had an attorney.

During the 1960s, the state attorney handled capital cases and grand jury indictments, while the county solicitor was responsible for all other cases. When Austin resigned to run for State Attorney in 1968, Frost was invited to change sides again, but he declined and was appointed to fill Austin's remaining term by Governor Claude Kirk. Frost was elected public defender later that year and retained the post until he retired in January 2005, running unopposed 9 times. Frost explained how that happened: "I was a Democrat in the mostly Republican Fourth Judicial Circuit. When Don Brewer was the head of the Republican Party he told me I was doing a fine job and I would run unopposed."

Frost was also asked to help establish other public defender offices across the country.

== Personal ==
Frost and his wife Shirley were married for 47 years and raised two children: Louis O. Frost IV and Deborah. He was a long-time member of Rotary International, and served as president of the Arlington Rotary Club. He was also active with Jacksonville's Morocco Temple, elected Illustrious Potentate in 1987, and a Master Mason, 33rd degree Scottish Rite, and a Jester.

Upon his retirement, Frost was interviewed by the Florida Times-Union: "It has been rewarding to see people whose careers I've helped and also to see people that we've defended turn the corner and turn their lives around. Those are the rewards that you never see, and those are the rewards that I've cherished."

== Retirement ==
Frost was diagnosed with stomach cancer and had surgery in March 2004 to remove an abdominal tumor, followed by 25 doses of chemotherapy. Before treatment, Frost had a slim body, and during chemo, his weight dropped to 105 pounds. He realized that he would not be able to return to work, and retirement was his only option. At his retirement party, delayed because of the cancer treatment, he commented,

Yes, it was difficult. The chemo really knocked me down, but I guess they almost have to kill you before you can start in your recovery. Everything is great, wonderful right now. I’m in remission and there have been no reoccurrences since my surgery. I’m blessed. I’m surrounded by the people I love.

More than 300 friends and colleagues attended a retirement celebration in his honor on February 24, 2005. They included judges, lawyers and politicians in the northeast Florida legal community, many of whom offered speeches in tribute.

State Attorney Harry Shorstein said, "Lou was your quintessential moral, ethical, caring person. The law can at times be very contentious, but Lou was always a gentleman."

Chief Circuit Judge Donald Moran commented, "He was so well-respected throughout the state of Florida, not only for his civic work but as a lawyer. He was a humble person, a gentleman's gentleman."

The cancer returned however, and four years after he was diagnosed, Frost died of complications after a long hospitalization.

== Honors ==
In 1975, Frost was honored by the National Legal Aid & Defender Association with their distinguished Reginald Heber Smith Award.

He received the Mary L. Singleton Justice, Peace and Social Harmony Award in 2001, and the D.W. Perkins Bar Association recognized him in 2004 for his "trail-blazing" dedication to hiring African-American lawyers.

In 2006, the Florida Public Defenders Association named him recipient of the L. Clayton Nance Award.

That same year, the Criminal Law Section of The Florida Bar bestowed the Selig Goldin Award in recognition of his distinguished career.

Legal offices
Preceded by Ed Austin	Public Defender, 4th Judicial Circuit; 1968–2005	Succeeded by Bill White
