= Bill White (lawyer) =

American lawyer (born 1945)

William "Bill" White
- Born: December 17, 1945 (age 80); Jacksonville, Florida, U.S.
- Education: University of Florida (BS); University of Florida Levin College of Law (JD)
- Occupation: Lawyer
- Employer: Retired
- Title: Public Defender, Fourth Judicial Circuit
- Term: 2004-2008
- Predecessor: Lou Frost
- Successor: Matt Shirk
- Political party: Democrat
- Relatives: Virginia, Deborah

Bill White (born December 17, 1945) is an American lawyer who served as Public Defender for Florida's Fourth Judicial Circuit, which covers Clay, Duval, and Nassau Counties. White was elected to the position in 2004, after serving as Chief Assistant Public Defender under his predecessor Lou Frost since 1976. White served as elected Public Defender from January 2005 to January 2009.

== Early life ==
White was born in Thomaston, Georgia in 1945. Both parents were World War II Navy veterans, who met and settled in Jacksonville. White has two sisters: Deborah and Virginia. White graduated from Englewood High School in 1963 and entered the University of Florida the same year. He graduated from the University of Florida with a Bachelor of Arts in political science in 1967, and entered the University of Florida College of Law. He left law school after one year, and joined the United States Navy, serving from 1968 to 1972, and returned to the University of Florida to conclude his legal studies at the Fredric G. Levin College of Law.

== Assistant Public Defender ==
In 1974, his final year of law school, he accepted an internship with the Public Defenders Office in Jacksonville under Lou Frost. He then served as an assistant public defender until 1976, when he was appointed as Chief Assistant to Mr. Frost. White held that position until he ran for and was elected to head the office upon Frost's retirement in 2004.

== Public Defender ==
In 2004, White ran unopposed to replace Frost. In 2008 he drew a challenge from former Assistant Public Defender Matt Shirk. Issues during the race included Party affiliation (White was running as a Democrat, Shirk as a Republican), and the relative low political profile of the Public Defender Office. White ran on a record of fiscal, ethical and legal proficiency and responsibility. Shirk indicated that he would make a more aggressive effort to collect fees from indigent clients. and that he would reform the method by which indigence of clients was determined in order to reduce the number of clients receiving services. On Election Night, White won Duval County by 26,320 votes. But when the final results came in from heavily Republican Clay and Nassau Counties Shirk had pulled ahead by 13,490 votes and White conceded.

== Post-Election ==
Following his election loss, White assumed a position at Communities in Schools Jacksonville, a non-profit educational resource for underprivileged children. He served there until March 2010 when he entered retirement.

== Term ==
Legal offices
Preceded by Lou Frost	Public Defender, 4th Judicial Circuit; 2004–2008	Succeeded by Matt Shirk
