= Forcible felony =

A forcible felony, in the criminal law of various US states, is a felony that is subject to special penalties because it involves the use or threat of physical force. Forcible felonies are defined by statute. Typical examples of forcible felonies include murder, arson, rape, kidnapping, and armed robbery.

== Police pursuits ==
Some states have adopted a "forcible felony rule", under which police are only authorized to use deadly force to apprehend people suspected of forcible felonies. Prior to the Supreme Court's 1985 decision in Tennessee v. Garner, this was a minority position, and many states authorized deadly force to apprehend any fleeing felon.

Many jurisdictions came to adopt the forcible felony rule for vehicular pursuits as well.

== Self-defense ==
Many states authorize the use of lethal force to prevent the commission of a forcible felony against oneself or others. These include Florida, Illinois, Oklahoma and Utah.

== Florida ==
Florida defines forcible felonies to include treason and burglary as well as violent felonies. Forcible felonies are subject to mandatory minimum sentences under the state's 10-20-Life law.

== Illinois ==
In addition to violent crimes, forcible felonies under Illinois law include burglary, residential burglary, and treason. Any felony may be a forcible felony under Illinois law if the felony "involves the use or threat of physical force or violence".

The Illinois rule for felony murder defines any killing that occurs in the commission of a forcible felony as first-degree murder, regardless of intent (unless the felony itself is second-degree murder). A 2021 reform included in the SAFE-T Act narrowed that rule to require that one of the participants in the felony have "caused the death of a person".

In 2018, Illinois was the first state in the US to adopt legislation recognizing postpartum depression and postpartum psychosis as mitigating factors in forcible felonies. The legislation applies to criminal sentencing as well as post-conviction relief.

== Works cited ==
- Tennenbaum, Abraham N. (1994). "The Influence of the Garner Decision on Police Use of Deadly Force". Journal of Criminal Law and Criminology. 85 (1): 241–260. doi:10.2307/1144118. JSTOR 1144118.
