= Angela Corey =

American attorney (born 1954)

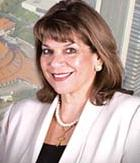

State Attorney for the Fourth Judicial Circuit Court of Florida
- In office 2009–2017
- Preceded by: Harry Shorstein
- Succeeded by: Melissa Nelson

Personal details
- Born: October 31, 1954 (age 71) Jacksonville, Florida, U.S.
- Party: Republican
- Education: Florida State University; University of Florida
- Occupation: Attorney

Angela Corey (born October 31, 1954) is a former Florida State's Attorney for the Fourth Judicial Circuit Court, which includes Duval, Nassau and Clay counties—including Jacksonville and the core of its metropolitan area. She was elected in 2008 as the first woman to hold the position, and was defeated on August 30, 2016, by Melissa Nelson, the second woman to hold the position. Corey was catapulted into the national spotlight on March 22, 2012, when Florida Governor Rick Scott announced that she would be the newly assigned State Attorney investigating the shooting death of Trayvon Martin (replacing State Attorney Norm Wolfinger).

On August 30, 2016, Corey lost her re-election primary to Republican challenger and former Nassau County prosecutor Melissa Nelson by nearly 50,000 votes, a margin of 38 percentage points.

== Early life and education ==
The granddaughter of Syrian immigrants, Corey was born and raised in Jacksonville, Florida, where she attended Englewood High School. Her parents are Tom Corey Jr. and Lorraine (Lewis) Corey. Her father's family owned the Corey Supermarket in Jacksonville, and her father became an executive at JEA in Jacksonville. After graduation, she majored in marketing at Florida State University before she decided to try a legal career. After receiving her Juris Doctor degree at the University of Florida's Levin College of Law, she did legal research while preparing for the Florida bar examination, then spent 18 months with Howell & Howell, PA (trial attorneys). She later became board certified in criminal trial law. She is an Episcopalian and active in her church.

== Career ==
=== Prosecutions ===
Corey was hired by Ed Austin in 1981 during his tenure as State Attorney from 1975 to 1991, and remained an Assistant State Attorney after Harry Shorstein was appointed by Governor Lawton Chiles in 1991. During her 34 years as a prosecutor, she tried several hundred cases, which includes more than 60 homicides.

In 1996, her primary responsibility became homicide prosecutions, but she also supervised lawyers in the Felony division. Shorstein changed Corey's work assignment in 2005 from director of the Gun Crime Unit to director of the County Court, which handles misdemeanors. In that position, she trained newly hired lawyers to be prosecutors. She previously served as Juvenile division supervisor.

=== State Attorney ===
Corey made the decision to run for the office of State Attorney in 2006. After her candidacy became known, her working relationship with Shorstein became difficult. He terminated her employment in November 2006. Afterwards, she was hired by John Tanner, State Attorney for the Seventh Judicial Circuit, to perform the same job functions, working homicide cases in St. Johns County.

The following day, Shorstein called a news conference and announced that he would retire at the end of his term and not run for re-election in 2008. In that election, Shorstein supported his chief assistant, Jay Plotkin. On August 26, 2008, Corey defeated Plotkin with more than 64% of the votes cast.

Upon taking office, Corey terminated 10 assistant state attorneys, as well as "half of the office’s investigators, two-fifths of its victim advocates, a quarter of its 35 paralegals, and 48 other support staff — more than one-fifth of the office." In 2010, the Florida Times-Union reported that Corey sent 230 juvenile felony cases to adult court in 2009. This was twice the number of juvenile felony cases placed in adult court in the years prior to Corey becoming State Attorney. After Corey took office, the number of juvenile arrests dropped in half. In 2009, 6,184 juvenile cases were opened. In 2014, that number dropped to 3,161. The number of juvenile cases transferred to adult court also dropped. In FY 2014-15, Corey's office ranked seventh in the state, out of 20 circuits, in juvenile direct files. State Attorney Corey spent more than a million dollars in FY 14-15 to run juvenile and adult diversion programs, meaning that defendant's cases are handled out of court.

==== Cristian Fernandez case ====
In 2011 Corey's office oversaw a case in which 12-year-old Cristian Fernandez was arrested for the murder of his two-year-old brother. Corey stated that because the juvenile system is not equipped to handle cases as serious as murder, the case was transferred to adult court. A grand jury indicted Fernandez on (adult) charges of first degree murder and aggravated child abuse.

From the beginning of the case, Corey stated her office would not be seeking a life sentence in this case. Corey also noted that the juvenile system was inadequate to handle a crime of this magnitude.

In 2013, Fernandez pleaded guilty to manslaughter as a juvenile (to be incarcerated until age 19 in juvenile facilities) and to aggravated battery as an adult but without adjudication (ensuring no felony record if he completes 5 years of probation successfully after release).

==== George Zimmerman case ====
On March 22, 2012, Florida governor Rick Scott appointed Angela Corey as Special Prosecutor to investigate the killing of Trayvon Martin by George Zimmerman. On the evening of February 26, 2012, in Sanford, Florida, George Zimmerman, a 28-year-old neighborhood watch volunteer armed with a 9mm Kel-Tec pistol, shot to death Trayvon Martin, an unarmed 17-year-old, in a gated community. A few hours after the killing, the Sanford Police Department determined that there was no "probable cause" to arrest George Zimmerman, who claimed that he acted in self-defense. Martin was returning to the home of his father's fiancee after purchasing a can of iced tea and a bag of Skittles candy at a local convenience store. Zimmerman told police that Martin was the aggressor.

The decision by Sanford Police Chief Bill Lee and Seminole County State Attorney Norm Wolfinger not to arrest and charge Zimmerman with a crime triggered outrage fueled by social media including a petition on Change.org calling for his prosecution. Following growing protests, including some 30,000 people in Sanford, Florida, as well as media coverage and engagement of the FBI, both police chief Bill Lee and state attorney Norm Wolfinger resigned from the investigation and state attorney Corey took over. The case added to a national debate over racial profiling, gun control, institutional racism in law enforcement agencies, and the role of American Legislative Exchange Council (ALEC) in advocating for pro-gun laws like Florida's "Stand Your Ground" bill.

On April 11, 2012, Corey charged George Zimmerman with murder in the second degree. Corey held a globally broadcast press conference to explain her decision. She stated, "I can tell you we did not come to this decision lightly. This case is like a lot of the difficult cases we have handled for years here in our circuit. And we made this decision in the same manner. Let me emphasize that we do not prosecute by public pressure or by petition. We prosecute based on the facts of any given case, as well as the laws of the state of Florida." When asked by a reporter about the issue of race and justice in the case, Corey stated, "Those of us in law enforcement are committed to justice for every race, every gender, every person, of any persuasion whatsoever. They are our victims. We only know one category as prosecutors, and that’s a V. It's not a B, it’s not a W, it’s not an H. It’s V, for 'victim'. That’s who we work tirelessly for."

Corey's decision to charge Zimmerman was praised by supporters of the Justice for Trayvon movement across the country. Natalie Jackson, a Martin family attorney, stated, "It's actually a very brave charge of Angela Corey, and it really shows that she conducted an independent, impartial and fair investigation in this case... She could have easily charged this as a manslaughter, to try to appease everyone, and she didn't. She did what prosecutors do. She charged it to the hilt". On the other hand, Corey was criticized as "irresponsible and reckless" by Alan Dershowitz, a Harvard legal scholar and attorney who served on O.J. Simpson's defense team, for filing a probable cause affidavit that he claims was too thin for a 2nd-degree murder charge; Dershowitz predicted that it would be thrown out by a judge.

On April 12, 2012, Seminole County Judge Mark Herr found the affidavit legally sufficient to establish probable cause and ordered Zimmerman to appear for his arraignment on May 29, 2012. CNN legal analyst Sunny Hostin stated, "I suspect that there is some evidence we just don't know about, because no prosecutor in a high-profile case wants to walk into court and not be able to prove each and every count beyond a reasonable doubt".

Some critics, including Dershowitz, believed that Corey, an elected official, treated her press conference as a sort of campaigning opportunity. A Reuters article also indicated that some of Zimmerman's neighbors who claimed they saw signs of injury on Zimmerman the day after the shooting "said they spoke to Sanford police and the FBI in their investigations but did not recall speaking to the office of special prosecutor Angela Corey". On the other hand, US attorney and legal analyst Kendall Coffey referred to Corey's presentation as "masterful" and that she made "a very compelling statement about her commitment to victims... So, if you were scoring that press conference, I give it an A plus".

Dershowitz called for Corey to be disbarred. In response to his harsh criticism, Dershowitz claimed that Corey called Harvard Law School and, "threatened to sue the institution, get me disciplined by the Bar, and made accusations of libel and slander".

The same day that the George Zimmerman trial was sent to the jury, Corey fired Ben Kruidbos, the information technology director for the State Attorney's office. The former IT director claimed he was concerned the office did not turn over all discovery to the defense. According to a hearing during the trial, the defense had the discovery items.

On July 13, 2013, the 6 woman jury acquitted Zimmerman of Second-Degree murder and the lesser included offense of Manslaughter.

==== Marissa Alexander case ====
In May 2012, Corey prosecuted 31-year-old Marissa Alexander for aggravated assault with a deadly weapon and obtained a mandatory minimum sentence of twenty years in prison, which generated controversy in the midst of the Trayvon Martin case. Alexander argued that she fired a warning shot after being threatened by her husband Rico Gray.

She and Gray engaged in an argument in the master bathroom. Gray returned to the kitchen where his children were eating breakfast. Alexander went into Gray's garage, where her car was parked. From the Duval County, Florida, court document:

The Defendant then retrieved the firearm from the glove box of the vehicle. The Defendant then returned to the kitchen with the firearm in her hand and pointed it in the direction of all three Victims. [Grey] put his hands in the air. Defendant shot at [Grey], nearly missing his head.

Alexander's shot missed her husband's head, hit the wall and deflected into the ceiling. Alexander, who had no previous criminal record or arrests, attempted a Stand Your Ground defense prior to trial but was unsuccessful. State Attorney Corey met with the defendant and offered her a three-year plea deal. Alexander rejected the offer and took her case to trial. A jury convicted her in twelve minutes and, because of the Florida 10-20-Life mandatory minimum statute, she was sentenced to a 20 years in prison. Corey was criticized for her handling of the case by Florida Congresswoman Corrine Brown, who argued that Corey overcharged Alexander and the result of Alexander's case was a consequence of institutional racism. Rev. Jesse Jackson, anti-domestic violence advocates, civil rights groups, and others also supported the call for Alexander's release from prison. On September 26, 2013, an appellate court ordered a new trial, finding that the jury instructions in Alexander's trial impermissibly shifted the burden of proof from the prosecution to the defense. Alexander was released on bail on November 27, 2013 and required to stay under house arrest.

Alexander pleaded guilty to all three counts on November 24, 2014. As part of a negotiated plea agreement, Alexander served a three-year minimum mandatory sentence on two of the counts. Judge James Daniel sentenced Alexander on the third count on January 27, 2015. On January 28, 2015, Marissa was released from prison and served the remainder of her 2-year sentence under house arrest.

==== Ronald Thompson case ====
In 2009, Ronald Thompson, a 65-year-old army veteran fired two shots into the ground to scare off teenagers who were demanding entry into his friend's house in Keystone Heights, Florida. Corey prosecuted Thompson for aggravated assault, and after he refused a plea agreement with a three-year prison sentence, won a conviction that would carry a mandatory 20-year sentence under Florida's 10-20-Life statute. In a similar case, Fourth Circuit Judge James Harrison called a mandatory minimum sentence "a crime in itself" and declared the 10-20-Life statute unconstitutional. Judge Skinner gave Thompson three years instead.

Corey appealed the 3-year sentence and won, sending Thompson to prison for 20 years.

In June 2012, Fourth Circuit Judge Don Lester granted Thompson a new trial, ruling that the jury instructions had been flawed in his original trial regarding the justifiable use of deadly or non-deadly force given the circumstances of the case. While awaiting his new trial, Mr. Thompson was offered a plea deal for five years in prison with credit for time served. He reported back to prison on October 31, 2013, where he served the remaining two years.

==== Michael Dunn case ====
In 2014, Corey prosecuted Michael David Dunn on five counts in a criminal case widely covered by the media and dubbed by CNN and other media as the "loud-music trial." Dunn was charged with the first-degree murder of 17-year-old Jordan Davis, three counts for the attempted first-degree murders of Davis' three friends, and shooting into or toward the Dodge Durango they occupied.

The case stemmed from a fatal confrontation at a gas station in Jacksonville on November 23, 2012, in which Dunn approached the Durango to request that the occupants lower the volume of the loud music (that he called "rap crap") they were listening to. At trial, Dunn claimed that Davis pointed a weapon toward him, though no evidence of any weapon was found. He claimed he felt his life was in danger and therefore defended himself using a personal gun stored in his car. In three separate volleys, he shot a total of ten bullets into the Durango while it was parked and then toward it as it fled. Davis died during the confrontation.

On February 15, 2014, jurors found Dunn guilty on three counts of attempted second-degree murder and one count of firing at a vehicle. They deadlocked on the first-degree murder charge. Judge Russell Healey declared a mistrial on that count. Corey later said in a press conference that "Justice for Jordan Davis is as important as it is for any victim" and prosecutors would press for a new trial in Duval County on the murder charge. Dunn was retried and convicted of First Degree Murder on October 1, 2014.

=== Teaching ===
Since the 1990s, Corey has taught legal concepts at a number of schools, including the University of North Florida, Florida State College at Jacksonville and the Florida Police Corps. Topics range from interrogation techniques to search and seizure to courtroom demeanor.

=== Politics ===
Corey is an active member of the Republican Party of Duval County and the Republican Women’s Club of Duval Federated. She served on the Transition Teams for both Governor Rick Scott and Attorney General Pam Bondi. Bondi endorsed Corey for State Attorney and said Corey's leadership and friendship led Bondi to where she was. Bondi subsequently worked with Governor Scott to appoint Corey as Special Prosecutor on the Trayvon Martin case.

== Pay and pension controversies ==
In early 2013 Corey came under scrutiny after a report emerged she had directed $108,439 to be allocated for an upgrade of her pension along with other prosecutors' pensions. Corey said the move was necessary because her predecessor, Harry Shorstein, chose not to enhance pension benefits when he could have. According to her the upgrade was needed due to a deficit created by the Legislature in 2001 when it increased the percentage rate earned each year on pensions, but did not increase benefits accrued earlier at the lower rate. Corey upgraded the pensions for more than a dozen prosecutors who were eligible. The retroactive pension upgrades were allowed under the 2001 law.

In February 2013, Corey issued $425,000 in, what she termed, "one-time pay increases" to most of her office staff. Florida law does not allow bonuses to be paid to public employees unless there are policies and procedures in place for issuing the bonuses. Corey contended that she did not break the law in issuing the payments because they were not bonuses, but instead they were temporary raises.

Legal offices
| Preceded by Harry Shorstein | State Attorney, 4th Judicial Circuit; 2009–2017 | Succeeded by Melissa Nelson |
