= List of punishments for murder in the United States =

Murder, as defined in common law countries, is the unlawful killing of another human being with intent (or malice aforethought), and generally this state of mind distinguishes murder from other forms of unlawful homicide (such as manslaughter). As the loss of a human being inflicts an enormous amount of grief for individuals close to the victim, as well as the fact that the commission of a murder permanently deprives the victim of their existence, most societies have considered it a very serious crime warranting the harshest punishments available. A person who commits murder is called a murderer, and the penalties, as outlined below, vary from state to state.

In 2005, the United States Supreme Court held that offenders under the age of 18 at the time of the murder were exempt from the death penalty under Roper v. Simmons.

In 2012, the United States Supreme Court held in Miller v. Alabama that mandatory sentences of life without the possibility of parole are unconstitutional for juvenile offenders.

== Federal ==
=== Civilian ===
| Offense | Mandatory Sentencing |
|---|---|
| Second degree murder | Any term of years or life without parole (There is no federal parole, U.S. sentencing guidelines offense level 38: 235–293 months with a clean record, 360 months–life with serious past offenses) |
| Second degree murder by an inmate, even escaped, serving a life sentence | Life |
| First degree murder | Death (aggravating circumstances), life without parole, or any term of years (only an option if the defendant was a juvenile) |

=== Military ===
| Offense | Mandatory Sentencing |
|---|---|
| Murder under UCMJ Article 118 Clause (2) or (3) (Second degree murder) | Any legal punishment (other than death) as directed by the court-martial |
| Murder under UCMJ Article 118 Clause (1) or (4) (First degree murder) | Death (aggravating circumstances), life without parole, or life (minimum of 20 years) |

=== District of Columbia ===
| Offense | Mandatory Sentencing |
|---|---|
| Second degree murder | Any term of years, but no more than 40 years (unless there are aggravating circumstances), or life without parole |
| First degree murder | 30–60 years (sentence can exceed 60 years if there are aggravating circumstances) or life without parole |
| Murder of a law enforcement officer | Life without parole (if the defendant was a juvenile, a judge sets a term of 60 years) |

=== Puerto Rico ===
| Offense | Mandatory Sentencing |
|---|---|
| Second degree murder | 15–50 years |
| First degree murder | 99 years |

=== U.S. Virgin Islands ===
| Offense | Mandatory Sentencing |
|---|---|
| Second degree murder | Not less than 5 years (10 years if the victim was a law enforcement officer) |
| First degree murder | Life without parole (For juveniles, a judge sets a sentence of any term of years not exceeding life) |

== By states ==
=== Alabama ===
| Offense | Mandatory Sentencing |
|---|---|
| Manslaughter | 2–20 years |
| Murder | 10–99 years (20–99 years if using deadly weapon) or life (minimum of 15 years) |
| Capital murder | Death, life without parole, or life with parole eligibility after 30 years (only an option if the defendant was a juvenile) |

=== Alaska ===
| Offense | Mandatory Sentencing |
|---|---|
| Second degree murder | 5–99 years |
| First degree murder | 30–99 years |
| First degree murder with an aggravating factor | 99 years without parole (can apply for a one-time reduction after 49.5 years; for juveniles, a judge can sentence them to 99 years and the governor can parole them) |

=== Arizona ===
| Offense | Mandatory Sentencing |
|---|---|
| Negligent homicide | 1–3.75 years (first violent felony offense) |
| Manslaughter | 7–21 years (first violent felony offense) |
| Second degree murder | 10–25 years (first violent felony offense) |
| Felony first degree murder | Death (aggravating circumstances), natural life imprisonment, or life (minimum of 25 years; 35 years if the victim was under the age of 15) |
| Premeditated first degree murder | Death (aggravating circumstances), natural life imprisonment, or life (minimum of 25 years; 35 years if the victim was under the age of 15; only an option if the defendant was a juvenile) |

=== Arkansas ===
| Offense | Mandatory Sentencing |
|---|---|
| Second degree murder | 6–30 years |
| First degree murder | 10–40 years or life without parole (eligible for parole after 25 years if the defendant was a juvenile) |
| Capital murder | Death or life without parole (eligible for parole after 30 years if the defendant was a juvenile) |

=== California ===
Excluding murder, all offenses below are eligible for probation terms. If probation is given, the maximum confinement sentence is up to a year in jail with up to five years of probation. If probation is denied, the following prison terms are used:

| Offense | Mandatory Sentencing |
|---|---|
| Any felony criminal homicide | Maximum $10,000 fine (not including fees/court costs and penalty assessments); Loss of gun rights; For involuntary manslaughter with a firearm or voluntary manslaughter or murder, a strike under California Three Strikes Law; Penalty Enhancements like the 10-20-life law or gang-related enhancement.; Victim restitution; Can't get probation for murder |
| Vehicular manslaughter (Standard Negligence) | Up to 1 year in county jail |
| Vehicular manslaughter (Gross Negligence) | Up to 1 year in county jail as a misdemeanor. 2, 4, or 6 years in state prison as a felony. |
| Vehicular manslaughter for Financial Gain | 4, 6, or 10 years in state prison |
| Involuntary manslaughter | 2, 3, or 4 years (a strike under California Three Strikes Law if a firearm was used) |
| Voluntary manslaughter | 3, 6, or 11 years |
| Second degree murder | 15 years to life (either 15 years to life or life without parole if the defendant served a prior murder conviction under Penal Code 190.05) |
| Second degree murder of a peace officer | 25 years to life (only an option if the defendant was a juvenile) (Life without parole if any of the following are true: The defendant's intention was to kill, OR; Intention was to cause great bodily injury, OR; A deadly weapon was used to kill.; If the defendant was a juvenile, they are given a sentence under California’s three-strikes law) |
| Second degree murder by shooting from a motor vehicle with intent to cause great bodily injury (Intent to cause death is prosecuted as First degree murder) | 20 years to life |
| First degree murder | 25 years to life (defendant must be eligible for parole after having BOTH turned 50 years old and having served 20 years, this does not apply if defendant has a previous violent felony) |
| Assault causing the death of a child under 8 years of age | 25 years to life (defendant must be eligible for parole after having BOTH turned 50 years old and having served 20 years, this does not apply if defendant has a previous violent felony) |
| First degree murder constituting a hate crime or of an operator or driver | Life without parole (eligible for parole after 25 years if the defendant was a juvenile) |
| First degree murder with special circumstances | Death or life without parole (eligible for parole after 25 years if the defendant was a juvenile) |

=== Colorado ===
| Offense | Mandatory Sentencing |
|---|---|
| Second degree murder | 16–48 years (followed by 5 years of mandatory parole) |
| First degree murder if the defendant was a juvenile | Life with parole eligibility after 40 years (eligible for parole after 20-25 years if certain prison programs completed) |
| First degree murder | Life without parole |

=== Connecticut ===
| Offense | Mandatory Sentencing |
|---|---|
| Second degree manslaughter | Maximum of 10 years (minimum of 1 year if a firearm is used) |
| First degree manslaughter | 1–20 years (5–40 years if a firearm was used) |
| Murder | 25–60 years (eligible for parole if the defendant was under the age of 25) |
| Murder with special circumstances | Life without parole (juveniles cannot be charged with murder with special circumstances) |

=== Delaware ===
| Offense | Mandatory Sentencing |
|---|---|
| Second degree murder | Minimum of 15 years and maximum of life without parole |
| First degree murder if the defendant was a juvenile | 25 years to life (defendants may seek a review of their sentence after 30 years) |
| First degree murder | Life without parole |

=== Florida ===
| Offense | Mandatory Sentencing |
|---|---|
| Manslaughter | 9 1/4–15 years (if downward departure is not granted) Maximum of 30 years in prison if: the offender used a deadly weapon or firearm; the victim was a vulnerable person under the care of the offender (a child under 18, elderly person, or disabled adult); the victim was an on duty police officer or a first responder; the offense was committed during a hit and run; Maximum of life without parole (eligible for review of sentence after 25 years if the defendant was a juvenile) if the victim was: a vulnerable person, under the care of the offender (a child under 18, elderly person, or disabled adult); or an on duty police officer or first responder; AND the offender used a deadly weapon or firearm |
| Third degree murder | 10 1/3–15 years (if downward departure is not granted) however the maximum enhanced to 30 years in prison if the offense had the intent to facilitate or further terrorism or the offender is a repeat offender. |
| Second degree murder | Minimum of 16.75 years in prison if downward departure is not granted Mandatory minimum of 25 years if firearm was used Maximum of life in prison without parole (eligible for parole after 25 years if the defendant was under 18) |
| First degree murder | Death or life without parole If under 18, the offender must be sentenced to a term of not less than 40 years and up to life although with a review after 25 years from the Florida Commission on Offender Review |

=== Georgia ===
| Offense | Mandatory Sentencing |
|---|---|
| Involuntary manslaughter | 1–10 years (felony) or up to 1 year (misdemeanor) |
| Voluntary manslaughter | 1–20 years |
| Second degree murder | 10–30 years |
| Murder | Death, life without parole, or life (minimum of 30 years) |

=== Hawaii ===
| Offense | Mandatory Sentencing |
|---|---|
| Second degree murder | Life imprisonment with the possibility of parole. There is enhanced sentencing for repeat offenders (HRS 706-606.5). |
| First degree murder | Life imprisonment without the possibility of parole, with possible commuting of sentence by the governor to life imprisonment with parole at the end of twenty years of imprisonment. (For juveniles, they are eligible for parole) (HRS §706-656); There is enhanced sentencing for repeat offenders. (HRS 706-606.5) |

=== Idaho ===
| Offense | Mandatory Sentencing |
|---|---|
| Second degree murder | Minimum of 10 years and maximum of life without parole |
| First degree murder | Death (aggravating circumstances), life without parole, or life (minimum of at least 10 years) |

=== Illinois ===
| Offense | Mandatory Sentencing |
|---|---|
| Second degree murder | 4–20 years (up to 4 years are probational) Certain factors increase the maximum to 30 years (up to 4 years are probational) |
| First degree murder | 20–60 years (eligible for parole if the defendant was under 21), 45 years to life (if firearm used), up to life without parole under certain aggravating circumstances (eligible for parole after 40 years if the defendant was under 21) |

=== Indiana ===
| Offense | Mandatory Sentencing |
|---|---|
| Murder | 45–65 years |
| Murder with aggravating circumstances | Death or life without parole (defendant under 16 cannot be sentenced to life without parole) |

=== Iowa ===
| Offense | Mandatory Sentencing |
|---|---|
| Second degree murder | 50 years with parole eligibility after 35 years (no minimum for parole eligibility if the defendant was a juvenile) |
| First degree murder | Life without parole or life (minimum term can be determined by judge; only an option if the defendant was a juvenile) |

=== Kansas ===
| Offense | Mandatory Sentencing |
|---|---|
| Second degree murder (unintentional) | 9–41 years |
| Second degree murder (intentional) | 12.5–54 years |
| Felony first degree murder | Life (minimum of 25 years) |
| Premeditated first degree murder | Life (minimum of 50 years; 25 years if the judge finds compelling reasons warranting a more lenient sentence) |
| Capital murder | Death, life without parole, or life with a minimum of 25/50 years (only an option if the defendant is a juvenile) |

=== Kentucky ===
| Offense | Mandatory Sentencing |
|---|---|
| Reckless homicide | 1–5 years |
| Second degree manslaughter | 5–10 years |
| First degree manslaughter | 10–20 years |
| Murder (no aggravating circumstances) | Life (minimum of 20 years) or 20–50 years |
| Murder (aggravating circumstances) | Death, life without parole, or life without parole for 25 years |

=== Louisiana ===
| Offense | Mandatory Sentencing |
|---|---|
| Manslaughter | Maximum of 40 years in prison (minimum of 10 years if the victim was a child under 10; eligible for parole after 25 years if the defendant was a juvenile) |
| Second degree murder | Life imprisonment, at hard labour, without the possibility of parole, probation or suspension of sentence (eligible for parole after 25 years if the defendant was a juvenile) |
| First degree murder | Death, life imprisonment without the possibility of parole, probation or suspension of sentence or life (minimum of 25 years; only an option if the defendant was a juvenile) |

=== Maine ===
| Offense | Mandatory Sentencing |
|---|---|
| Manslaughter | Maximum of 30 years in prison |
| Felony murder | Maximum of 30 years in prison |
| Murder | Minimum of 25 years and maximum of life without parole |

=== Maryland ===
| Offense | Mandatory Sentencing |
|---|---|
| Involuntary manslaughter | Maximum of 10 years in prison |
| Voluntary manslaughter | Maximum of 10 years in prison |
| Second degree murder | Maximum of 40 years in prison |
| First degree murder | Life without parole or life (minimum of 20 years; the judge can suspend part of the sentence) |

=== Massachusetts ===
| Offense | Mandatory Sentencing |
|---|---|
| Second degree murder | Life (minimum of 15–25 years) |
| First degree murder | Life without parole or life (minimum of 20-30 years; only an option of the defendant was under 21) |

=== Michigan ===
| Offense | Mandatory Sentencing |
|---|---|
| Second degree murder | Any term of years or life (minimum of 15 years) |
| First degree murder | Life without parole or any terms of years (only an option if the defendant was under 21) |

=== Minnesota ===
| Offense | Mandatory Sentencing |
|---|---|
| Second degree manslaughter | Maximum of 10 years in prison (5 years for clean record) |
| First degree manslaughter | Maximum of 15 years in prison (7–10 years for clean records) |
| Third degree murder | Maximum of 25 years in prison (12.5 years for clean record) |
| Second degree murder | Maximum of 40 years in prison (if a person had a clean record, 12.5 years but if intentional, 25.5 years) |
| First degree murder | Life (minimum of 30 years; 15 years if the defendant was a juvenile) |
| First degree murder if the murder was premeditated or involved rape, kidnapping, or terrorism, if the victim was a law enforcement or prison officer, or if the defendant has one or more previous convictions for a "heinous crime" | Life without parole (eligible for parole after 15 years if the defendant was a juvenile) |

=== Mississippi ===
| Offense | Mandatory |
|---|---|
| Manslaughter | Maximum of 20 years in prison |
| Second degree murder | Life (eligible for conditional release at age 65 and having served at least 15 years) or 20–40 years |
| First degree murder if the defendant was a juvenile | On or after July 1, 2024: Life (eligible for conditional release at age 65) or 20–40 years Before July 1, 2024: Any legal punishment (other than death) as directed by the court |
| First degree murder | Life (eligible for conditional release at age 65 and having served at least 15 years) |
| Capital murder if the defendant was a juvenile | On or after July 1, 2024: Life without parole, life (eligible for conditional release at age 65 and having served at least 15 years), or 25–50 years Before July 1, 2024: Any legal punishment (other than death) as directed by the court |
| Capital murder | Death, life without parole, or life (eligible for conditional release at age 65 and having served at least 15 years) |

=== Missouri ===
| Offense | Mandatory Sentencing |
|---|---|
| Second degree murder | Life (minimum of 25.5 years) or 10–30 years |
| First degree murder if the defendant was a juvenile | Life without parole (only an option if aggravating circumstances are present), life (minimum of 25 years), or 30–40 years |
| First degree murder | Death (aggravating circumstances) or life without parole. |

=== Montana ===
| Offense | Mandatory Sentencing |
|---|---|
| Negligent homicide | Maximum of 20 years in prison |
| Mitigated deliberate homicide | 2–40 years |
| Deliberate homicide | Death (aggravating circumstances), life without parole, life (minimum of 30 years), or 10–100 years |

=== Nebraska ===
| Offense | Mandatory Sentencing |
|---|---|
| Second degree murder | Minimum of 20 years and maximum of life without parole (eligible for parole if the defendant was under 18) |
| First degree murder | Death (aggravating circumstances), life without parole (reviewed by Nebraska state parole board), or 40 years to life (only an option if the defendant was under 18; sentence can be halved for good behavior) |

=== Nevada ===
Under Assembly Bill 267, juveniles must have parole eligibility begin after 20 years if only one death occurred. Nevada does not have guidelines on when to offer parole if more than one person was killed. But the judge would apply the same as if it was just one victim.

| Offense | Mandatory Sentencing |
|---|---|
| Second degree murder | Life (minimum of 10 years) or 25 years with parole eligibility after 10 years |
| First degree murder | Death (aggravating circumstances), life without parole, life (minimum of 20 years), or 50 years with parole eligibility after 20 years (Juveniles cannot be sentenced to life without parole even there was more than one death, in which case the same guidelines apply.) |

=== New Hampshire ===
| Offense | Mandatory Sentencing |
|---|---|
| Negligent Homicide | Imprisonment for a term of not less than 3 1/2 years and not more than 7 years |
| Causing or Aiding Suicide | For causing a suicide or suicide attempt, imprisonment for a term of up to seven years in prison. For aiding or assisting in a suicide or suicide attempt without causing the suicide or attempt, up to one year in jail. |
| Manslaughter | Imprisonment for a term of not more than 30 years |
| Second degree murder | Life with parole or any number of years |
| First degree murder | Life without parole or life with parole (only an option if the defendant was under 18) |
| Capital murder | Life without parole (juvenile cannot be charged with capital murder) |

=== New Jersey ===
| Offense | Mandatory Sentencing |
|---|---|
| Murder | Minimum of 30 years and maximum of life in prison (minimum of 63 years; 20 years if the defendant was a juvenile) |
| Murder (with aggravating circumstances) | Life without parole (eligible for parole after 20 years if the defendant was a juvenile) |

=== New Mexico ===
| Offense | Mandatory Sentencing |
|---|---|
| Involuntary manslaughter | Maximum of 4 years in prison |
| Voluntary manslaughter | Maximum of 6 years in prison |
| Second degree murder | Maximum of 18 years in prison |
| First degree murder | Life (minimum of 30 years; 20 years if the defendant was a juvenile, 25 years for multiple first degree murder convictions) |
| First degree murder with aggravating circumstances | Life without parole (eligible for parole after 20 years if the defendant was a juvenile, 25 years for multiple first degree murder convictions) |

=== New York ===
| Offense | Mandatory Sentencing |
|---|---|
| Second degree murder | Life (minimum of 15–25 years; life without parole if victim was under 14 and crime was sexually motivated) |
| First degree murder (juveniles cannot be charged with first degree murder) | Life without parole or life (minimum of 20–25 years) |
| Aggravated murder (juveniles cannot be charged with aggravated murder) | Life without parole |

=== North Carolina ===
| Offense | Mandatory Sentencing |
|---|---|
| Involuntary manslaughter | Maximum of 59 months (sentence without criminal record is 10 to 20 months) |
| Voluntary manslaughter | Maximum of 204 months (sentence without criminal record is 38 to 80 months) |
| Second degree murder (inherently dangerous act or by unlawful distribution of certain illicit substances) | Maximum of 484 months (sentence without criminal record is 94 to 196 months) |
| Second degree murder | Maximum of life without parole (sentence without criminal record is 144 to 300 months) |
| First degree murder | Death (aggravating circumstances), life without parole, or life (minimum of 25 years; only an option if the defendant was a juvenile) |

=== North Dakota ===
| Offense | Mandatory Sentencing |
|---|---|
| Manslaughter | Maximum of 10 years in prison |
| Murder committed under "extreme emotional disturbance" | Maximum of 20 years in prison |
| Murder | Life without parole, life (minimum of 30 years), or any number of years (juveniles cannot be sentenced to life without parole) |

=== Ohio ===
Parole Eligibility for Defendants Under 18 (SB 256)
| Offense | Maximum Parole Eligibility |
|---|---|
| One or more homicide offenses | 25 years |
| Two or more homicide offenses if the defendant was the principal offender for at least two of them | 30 years |
| Aggravated homicide (considered the purposeful killing of three or more people when the defendant is the principal offender in each offense), or murder (second-degree murder) or aggravated murder (first-degree murder) involving terrorism | No maximum |

| Offense | Mandatory Sentencing |
|---|---|
| Involuntary manslaughter | 4.5–16.5 years (if underlying offense is a felony); 9 months to 3 years (if underlying offense is a misdemeanor) |
| Voluntary manslaughter | 4.5–16.5 years |
| Murder | Life with parole eligibility after 15 years (30 years if victim under 13 years old and committed with a sexual motivation; life without parole if committed with a sexual motivation and the defendant has a sexually violent predator specification, or involving terrorism) |
| Aggravated murder | Life without parole or life with parole eligibility after 20, 25, or 30 years |
| Aggravated murder with capital specifications | Death, life without parole or life with parole eligibility after 25 or 30 years (if victim was under 13 years old and the murder was committed with a sexual motivation, the minimum sentence is life with parole eligibility after 30 years; if committed with a sexual motivation and the defendant has a sexually violent predator specification, or involving terrorism, the minimum sentence is life without parole) |

=== Oklahoma ===
| Offense | Mandatory Sentencing |
|---|---|
| Second degree murder | Minimum of 10 years and maximum of life (minimum of 38 years; portion of sentence can be suspended at judge's discretion) |
| First degree murder | Death (aggravating circumstances), life without parole, or life (minimum of 38 years; portion of sentence can be suspended at judge's discretion) |

=== Oregon ===
| Offense | Mandatory Sentencing |
|---|---|
| Second degree murder | Life (minimum of 25 years; 15 years if the defendant was a juvenile) |
| First degree murder | Life without parole or life (minimum of 30 years for adults, 15 years if the defendant was under 18 and only an option) |
| Aggravated murder | Death, life without parole, or life (minimum of 30 years for adults, 15 years if the defendant was under 18 and only an option) |

=== Pennsylvania ===
| Offense | Mandatory sentence |
|---|---|
| Third degree murder | Maximum of 40 years in prison (parole eligibility cannot exceed more than half the maximum sentence) |
| Second degree murder if the defendant was under 15 | Life (minimum of at least 20 years) |
| Second degree murder if the defendant was 15-17 | Life (minimum of at least 30 years) |
| Second degree murder | Life without parole (eligible for commutation by governor provided there is a unanimous recommendation by the Board of Pardons) |
| First degree murder if the defendant was under 15 | Life (minimum of at least 25 years) |
| First degree murder if the defendant was under 15-17 | Life (minimum of at least 35 years) |
| First degree murder | Death (aggravating circumstances) or life without parole (eligible for commutation by governor provided there is a unanimous recommendation by the Board of Pardons) |

=== Rhode Island ===
| Offense | Mandatory sentence |
|---|---|
| Second degree murder | Minimum of 10 years (eligible for parole after serving half the sentence) and maximum of life (minimum of 25 years) |
| First degree murder | Life without parole or life (minimum of 25 years) |

=== South Carolina ===
| Offense | Mandatory Sentencing |
|---|---|
| Involuntary manslaughter | Maximum of 5 years in prison |
| Voluntary manslaughter | 2–30 years |
| Murder | Death (aggravating circumstances), life without parole, or no less than 30 years |

=== South Dakota ===
| Offense | Mandatory Sentencing |
|---|---|
| First degree manslaughter | Any term of years or life without parole (juveniles cannot be sentenced to life without parole) |
| Second degree murder | Life without parole (if the defendant was a juvenile, they are sentenced to any number of years) |
| First degree murder | Death (aggravating circumstances) or life without parole (if the defendant was a juvenile, they are sentenced to any number of years) |

=== Tennessee ===
| Offense | Mandatory Sentencing |
|---|---|
| Second degree murder | 15–25 years (Range I offender), 25–40 years, (Range II offender), 40–60 years (Range III offender) |
| First degree murder (no aggravating circumstances) | Life (minimum of 51 years; 25 years if the defendant was a juvenile) |
| First degree murder (aggravating circumstances) | Death, life without parole, or life (minimum of 51 years; 25 years if the defendant was a juvenile) |

=== Texas ===
| Offense | Mandatory Sentencing |
|---|---|
| Murder (Second-Degree Murder) | 5–99 years (eligible for parole after half the sentence or 30 years, whichever is less) or life (minimum of 30 years) |
| Capital murder (First-Degree Murder) | Death or life without parole (eligible for parole after 40 years if the defendant was a juvenile) |

=== Utah ===
| Offense | Mandatory Sentencing (Parole eligibility determined by parole board) |
|---|---|
| Murder | Life (minimum of 15 years) |
| Aggravated murder | Death, life without parole, or life (minimum of 25 years; juveniles cannot be sentenced to life without parole) |

=== Vermont ===
| Offense | Mandatory Sentencing |
|---|---|
| Second degree murder if mitigating factors outweigh any aggravating factors | Life (minimum of 10–20 years) |
| Second degree murder | Life (minimum of 20 years) |
| Second degree murder if aggravating factors outweigh any mitigating factors | Life without parole (juveniles cannot be sentenced to life without parole) or life (minimum of at least 20 years) |
| First degree murder if mitigating factors outweigh any aggravating factors | Life (minimum of 15–35 years) |
| First degree murder | Life (minimum of 35 years) |
| First degree murder if aggravating factors outweigh any mitigating factors | Life without parole (juveniles cannot be sentenced to life without parole) or life (minimum of at least 35 years) |
| Aggravated murder | Life without parole (juveniles cannot be sentenced to life without parole) |

=== Virginia ===
| Offense | Mandatory Sentencing |
|---|---|
| Involuntary manslaughter | 1–10 years |
| Volnutary manslaughter | 1–10 years |
| Second degree murder | 5–40 years |
| Felony murder | 5–40 years |
| First degree murder | Minimum of 20 years and maximum of life in prison (prisoners are eligible for geriatric parole when they turn 60; eligible for parole after 20 years if the defendant was a juvenile) |
| Aggravated murder | Life without parole (ineligible for geriatric parole; eligible for parole after 20 years if the defendant was a juvenile) (Judge can use discretion to suspend portion of life sentence unless the victim was a police officer) |

=== Washington ===
| Offense | Mandatory sentence |
|---|---|
| Second degree murder if defendant is under 18 | Maximum of life with the possibility of parole after 20 years (10–18 years is standard sentence without criminal record) |
| Second degree murder if defendant is 18+ | Maximum of life without parole (10–18 years is standard sentence without criminal record) |
| First degree murder if defendant is under 18 | Maximum of life with the possibility of parole after 20 years (20–27 years is standard sentence without criminal record) |
| First degree murder if defendant is 18+ | Mandatory minimum of 20 years, maximum of life without parole (20–27 years is standard sentence without criminal record) |
| Aggravated first degree murder if defendant is under 18 | Mandatory minimum of 25 years, maximum of life with the possibility of parole after 25 years |
| Aggravated first degree murder if defendant is 18-20 | Mandatory minimum of 25 years, maximum of life without parole |
| Aggravated first degree murder | Life without parole |

=== West Virginia ===
| Offense | Mandatory Sentencing |
|---|---|
| Second degree murder | 10–40 years |
| First degree murder | Life without parole or life (minimum of 15 years) |

=== Wisconsin ===
| Offense | Mandatory Sentencing |
|---|---|
| Second degree reckless homicide | Maximum of 15 years in prison |
| First degree reckless homicide | 15–60 years |
| Second degree intentional homicide | 15–60 years |
| First degree intentional homicide | Life without parole or life (minimum of no less than 20 years) |

=== Wyoming ===
| Offense | Mandatory Sentencing |
|---|---|
| Manslaughter | Maximum of 20 years in prison |
| Second degree murder | Minimum of 20 years and maximum of life (minimum set by judge; can only be parole by governor if no minimum set) |
| First degree murder if defendant was a juvenile | Life (minimum of 25 years) |
| First degree murder | Death (aggravating circumstances), life without parole, or life (can only be paroled by governor) |

== Bibliography ==
- Lord Mustill on the Common Law concerning murder
- Sir Edward Coke Co. Inst., Pt. III, ch.7, p. 50
