= 10-20-Life =

Mandatory minimum sentencing law

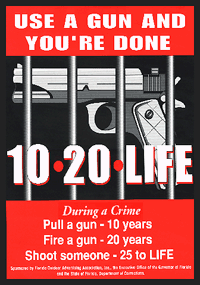
One of the PSA posters designed to inform the public about the law

The Florida Statute 775.087, known as the 10-20-Life law, is a mandatory minimum sentencing law in the U.S. state of Florida. The law concerns the use of a firearm during the commission of a forcible felony. The Florida Statute's name comes from a set of three basic minimum sentences it provides for. A public service announcement campaign accompanied the law after its passage under the slogan "Use a gun, and you're done."

== Background ==
As of 1998, the year before the law went into effect, guns were used in 31,643 violent felonies in Florida. At that time, the mandatory sentence for using a gun in a violent felony was three years in prison. That same year, Jeb Bush, then a candidate for governor in the 1998 gubernatorial election, proposed the 10-20-Life law and advocated it as a core element of his campaign platform. Following his successful election and assumption of office in January 1999, the Florida Legislature passed the governor's proposal. The law went into effect on July 1, 1999, amending section 775.087 of the Florida Statutes. In 2000, the Legislature extended the mandatory sentences to cover 16- and 17-year-olds who fire a gun (during a violent crime), and those offenders with prior criminal records.

== Provisions ==
The law specifies exactly what categories of crimes fall under it, mandates that offenders be sentenced to the law's maximum allowable extent for the committed felony, and states that the mandatory sentences must be completed consecutively to any additional sentence an offender must serve.

The law's name comes from three main mandatory sentences: 1) producing a firearm during the commission of certain felonies mandates at least a 10-year prison sentence; 2) firing one mandates at least a 20-year prison sentence; and 3) shooting someone mandates a minimum sentence of 25 years to life regardless of whether a victim is killed or minorly injured. The maximum penalty is a life sentence unless the defendant is charged with felony murder or first degree murder in which case the maximum is the death penalty.

In addition to the "10-20-Life" rule itself, the law also established or increased other mandatory minimum prison sentences:

- Three years for felons who possess a firearm;
- Three years for aggravated assault with a firearm;
- Three years for aggravated assault on a police officer;
- Three years for aggravated assault on a person aged 65 years or older;
- Five years for aggravated battery on an officer;
- Eight years for possessing a machine gun, or semiautomatic firearm while committing any type of battery on an officer or person aged 65 years or older;
- Fifteen years if the offender is in possession of either a machine gun or a semiautomatic gun with a high-capacity box magazine while committing a crime listed under statute 775.087.

It also created minimum sentences for convicted drug traffickers. Drug offenses that warrant a mandatory sentence begin at the level of a three-year prison term. Depending on the type of drug, the amount of it, and also whether the drug has resulted in anyone's death, the minimum penalties may increase to 7, 15 or 25 years, life or death.

=== Waiver of mandatory minimums ===
Under Florida law, the prosecutor in a case is the only person eligible to waive any mandatory minimum. Judges can issue a waiver if the defendant is sentenced as a youthful offender, which would cap the maximum penalty at 6 years of any supervision whether it be prison or probation. One of the qualifications for a youthful offender sentence is that the defendant be no more than 20 years of age at the time of the sentence.

== Concurrent acts designed for repeat offenders ==
In addition to the 10-20-Life system, Jeb Bush and Florida Legislature also implemented or modified several other acts designed for repeat offenders. These acts include Violent Career Criminal, Habitual felony offender, Habitual violent felony offender, Three-time violent felony offender, Prison Releasee Reoffender, and Dangerous Sexual Felony Offender.

These acts, as designed, hand down mandatory minimum sentencing for offenders that fall under them. It is the prosecutor's decision whether or not to classify a defendant under any of these acts if the criteria present themselves. If the prosecutor does not classify the defendant under any of these acts even though they qualify, a reason must be written and filed into the court records.

== Effectiveness ==
According to the Florida Parole Commission (FPC), in 2000, there was a 26.4% decrease in violent, gun-related crime compared to 1998. Florida's "Index Crime" rate for 2000, which is based on a variety of different crimes, had dropped 18% from the previous year, and had reached its lowest level in 28 years. According to the Florida Department of Corrections (FDC), by 2004, violent gun crime rates had fallen 30% since 1998, and the Index Crime rate had reached the lowest in 34 years, despite a 16.8% increase in population during that time period. The Florida Parole Commission and Department of Corrections both acknowledged that these results were influenced by a multitude of crime prevention programs in addition to the 10-20-Life law, such as the Three-Strike Violent Felony Offender Act, the Habitual Juvenile Offender Accountability Act and "Operation T.H.U.G.S." ("Taking Hoodlums Using Guns Seriously"), a program targeting felons with warrants for violent-crime and a violent history.

University of Florida criminologist Alex Piquero, who conducted a study on the legislation in 2006, noted the Florida Department of Law Enforcement's joint anti-crime programs with local law enforcement, such as Operation T.H.U.G.S., along with the “use a gun and you’re done” public service announcement campaign. He also noted that the overall crime rate had been declining before the law's passage. Contrary to the FDC and FPC, Piquero stated that the drop in state crime since the law's passage was more likely attributable to the national decline in crime over the same time period.

== See also ==
- Armed robbery
- Crime in the United States
- Mandatory sentencing
- Three strikes law
- Violent crime
