= Harry Shorstein =

American lawyer (1940–2026)

State Attorney for the Fourth Judicial Circuit Court of Florida
- In office 1992–2008
- Preceded by: Ed Austin
- Succeeded by: Angela Corey

Personal details
- Born: Harry Louis Shorstein; August 3, 1940 Jacksonville, Florida, U.S.
- Died: October 23, 2026 (aged 86) Jacksonville, Florida, U.S.
- Party: Democratic
- Spouse: Ann R.
- Children: 1
- Education: Bachelor, Juris Doctor
- Alma mater: University of Florida
- Occupation: attorney

Harry Louis Shorstein (August 3, 1940 – October 23, 2026) was an American lawyer who served as State Attorney for Florida's Fourth Judicial Circuit Court, covering Duval, Clay and Nassau counties, from 1991–2008. A member of the Democratic Party, he was appointed to the post in 1991 by Governor Lawton Chiles to fill the remaining term of Ed Austin, who resigned to successfully run for mayor of Jacksonville. He was elected to a full term in 1992, re-elected in 1996, and ran unopposed in 2000 and 2004. At a February 6, 2007 news conference, the 66-year-old lawyer announced that he would not run for re-election in 2008. He subsequently returned to private practice, and was succeeded as State Attorney by Angela Corey.

== Early life and career ==
Shorstein grew up in Jacksonville, graduated from Robert E. Lee High School and attended the University of Florida in Gainesville, where he received his bachelor's and law degrees. He was admitted to the Florida Bar on October 25, 1965.

He served in Vietnam as a captain in the United States Marine Corps, being awarded a Bronze Star Medal with Combat "V", a Combat Action Ribbon, the Vietnamese Cross of Gallantry, and a Presidential Unit Citation.

After the war, he was hired by Public Defender Lou Frost and worked in that office before switching sides to the prosecution in 1970 as Division Head and Chief Assistant State Attorney. In 1974, Shorstein began two years as General Counsel for the City of Jacksonville, then switched to private practice for 15 years. In 1991 he was appointed State Attorney. Among the cases prosecuted during his term was the Brenton Butler case, in which the 15-year-old Butler was wrongfully accused of murder, and was later acquitted.

After leaving office, he joined the firm of Shorstein & Lasnetski, where he worked with his youngest son, Paul. He had recently been considered for appointment as the United States Attorney for the Middle District of Florida. His successor, Angela Corey (who had been fired by Shorstein in 2007), "sent a letter to Florida's senators demanding that they oppose Shorstein's pending nomination as a U.S. attorney," writing that "he should not hold a position of authority in his community again, because of his penchant for using the grand jury for personal vendettas." As of June 10, 2010, President Barack Obama had selected career federal prosecutor Bobby O'Neill, out of Tampa, for the position.

== Work in the Juvenile Justice Program ==
Shorstein launched a new juvenile justice program in Jacksonville that takes a three-pronged approach to juvenile crime. To reduce juvenile crime, it encourages both early intervention in high risk populations and rehabilitation among offenders. For violent and repeat offenders, it promotes incarceration. From 1993 to 1996, juvenile crime in Jacksonville decreased dramatically, which a Florida State University study attributed to the implementation of the plan. However, the same cannot be said for the adult offender program, especially the murder rate, which has given Jacksonville the distinction of being Florida's murder capital for fourteen of last nineteen years.

== Death ==
Shorstein died on October 23, 2026, at the age of 86.

Legal offices
Preceded by Ed Austin	State Attorney, 4th Judicial Circuit; 1991–2008	Succeeded by Angela Corey
