= Snyder Memorial Methodist Episcopal Church =

- U.S. National Register of Historic Places
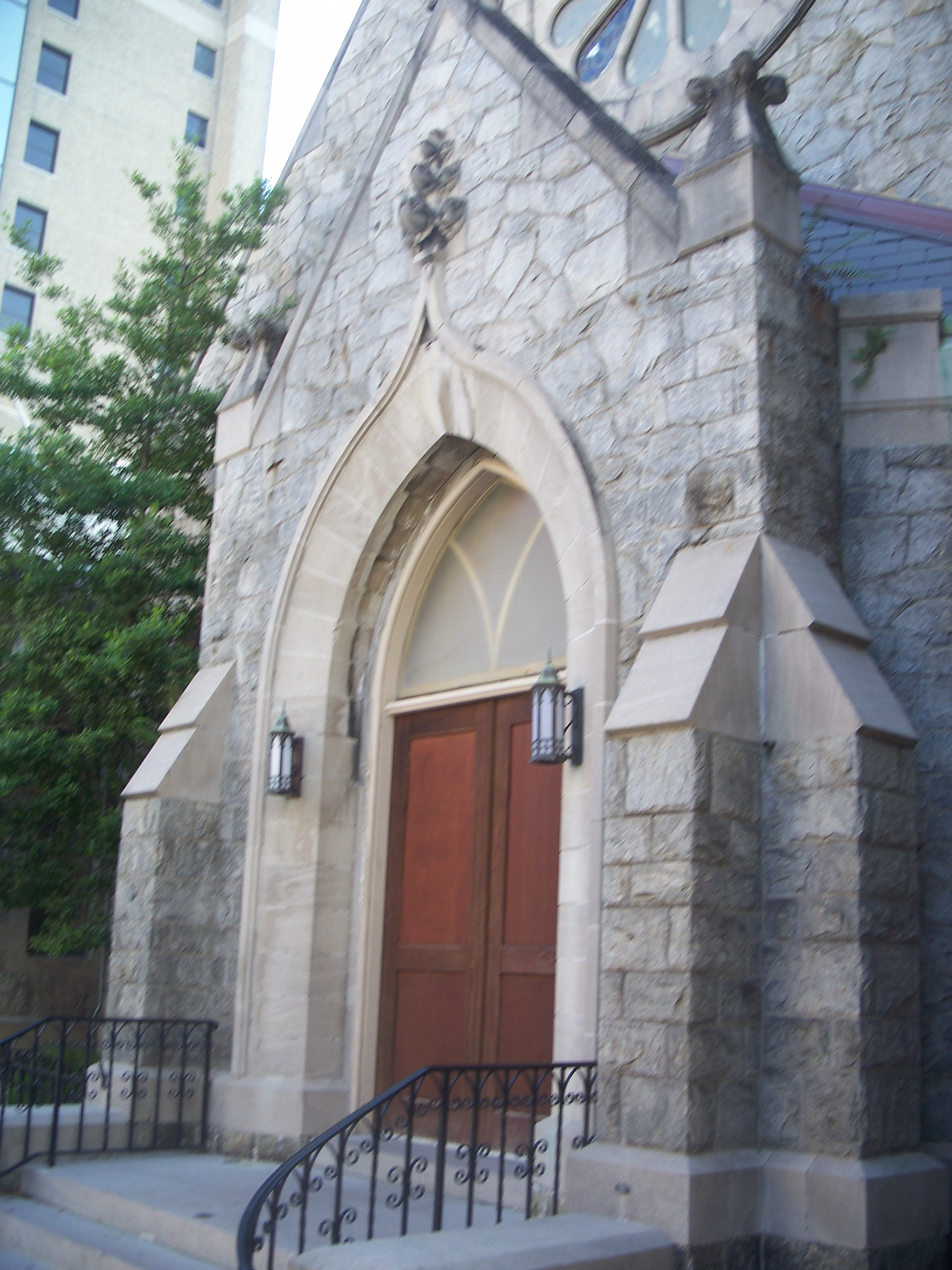
- Snyder Methodist Church

- Location within Florida Location within the United States
- Location: Jacksonville, Florida
- Coordinates: 30.32873°N 81.65895°W
- Built: 1902-03
- Architect: J. H. W. Hawkins
- Architectural style: Late Gothic Revival Style
- NRHP reference No.: 13000065
- Added to NRHP: March 13, 2013

Snyder Memorial Methodist Church, originally known as Trinity Methodist Episcopal Church, is a historic 1903 church in Jacksonville, Florida. It is located at 226 North Laura Street in Duval County (on the historic corner of Laura and Monroe streets). The Snyder Memorial Methodist congregation was founded in 1870, and the church was constructed following the loss of a previous church during the 1901 Jacksonville Fire on the same site as its predecessor. J. H. W. Hawkins was the building's architect. The new church was named Snyder Memorial in honor of former pastor E.B. Snyder whose children contributed to the rebuilding effort. It was later sold to the City of Jacksonville. It was added to the National Register of Historic Places on March 13, 2013. After being shuttered for a decade, it was announced that the historic church would be a future stop on the monthly Downtown Jacksonville Art Walk.

Snyder Memorial Church was constructed in a Gothic Revival architecture style for $31,000. It is made of granite and Indiana limestone. It includes a crenelated bell tower and an intricate rose window overlooking James Weldon Johnson Park. The church is owned by the City of Jacksonville.

The church played a role in civil rights activities in Jacksonville - it hosted community discussions and negotiations following Ax Handle Saturday.

== See also ==
National Register of Historic Places listings in Duval County, Florida
