= Ax Handle Saturday =

1960 race riot in Jacksonville, Florida

- Part of Civil Rights Movement
- Date: August 27, 1960; 65 years ago
- Location: Hemming Park; Jacksonville, Florida

Parties
White rioters	Black protesters

Ax Handle Saturday, also known as the Jacksonville riot of 1960, was a racially motivated attack in Hemming Park (since renamed James Weldon Johnson Park) in Jacksonville, Florida, United States, on August 27, 1960. A group of about 200 white men used baseball bats and ax handles to attack black people who were in sit-in protests opposing racial segregation.

== History ==
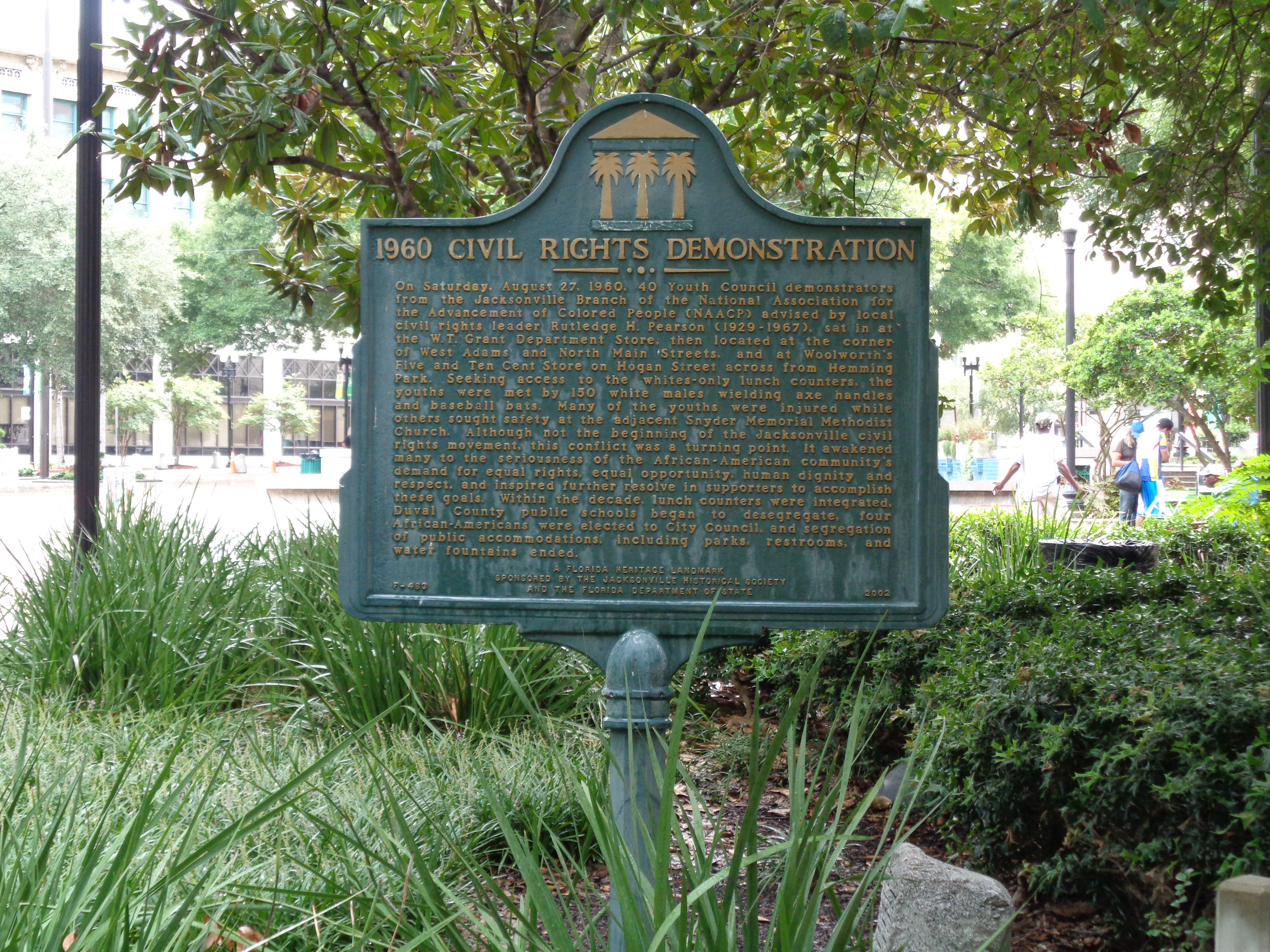
In 2002, a commemorative plaque was installed in Hemming Park, since renamed James Weldon Johnson Park.

Because of its high visibility and patronage, Hemming Park and surrounding stores were the site of numerous civil rights demonstrations in the 1960s. Black sit-ins began on August 13, 1960, when students asked for service at the segregated lunch counter at W. T. Grant, Woolworths, Morrison's Cafeteria, and other eateries. They were denied service, kicked, spat at, and addressed with racial slurs.

On August 27, 1960, a group of approximately 200 white men, some of whom were thought to have Ku Klux Klan affiliations, gathered in Hemming Park armed with baseball bats and ax handles. They attacked the protesters conducting sit-ins. The violence spread, and the white mob started attacking all black people in sight. Rumors were rampant on both sides that the unrest was spreading around the county. Actually, the violence stayed in relatively the same location, and did not spill over into the mostly white, upper-class Cedar Hills neighborhood, for example. A black street gang called the Boomerangs came to protect the demonstrators. Police had not intervened when the protesters were attacked, but when "blacks started holding their own" and the Boomerangs and other black residents attempted to stop the beatings, the police arrested them for it.

Nat Glover, who later worked in Jacksonville law enforcement for 37 years, including eight years as sheriff of Jacksonville, recalled stumbling into the riot. Glover said he ran to the police, expecting them to arrest the thugs, but was told to leave town or risk being killed.

Several white people had joined the black protesters on that day. Richard Charles Parker, a 25-year-old student attending Florida State University, was among them. White protesters were the object of particular dislike by racists, so when the fracas began, Parker was hustled out of the area for his own protection. The police had been watching him and arrested him as an instigator, charging him with vagrancy, disorderly conduct and inciting a riot. After Parker stated that he was proud to be a member of the NAACP, Judge John Santora sentenced him to 90 days in jail. He was attacked in jail, suffering a broken jaw, after which Santora sentenced him to a road gang.

=== Aftermath ===
Local authorities and news media downplayed the violence. Mayor Haydon Burns claimed there was no violence, and Jacksonville's leading newspaper buried the story on page fifteen. It was covered by local Black publications, out-of-town reporters, and in Life magazine. The mayor alleged most rioters were not Jacksonville residents and refused to convene a committee requested by the NAACP to address racial discrimination.

Snyder Memorial Methodist Episcopal Church hosted community discussions and negotiations following the incident. Lunch counters in Jacksonville were desegregated in 1961.

== See also ==
- List of incidents of civil unrest in the United States
