= Confederate Memorial (Jacksonville, Florida) =

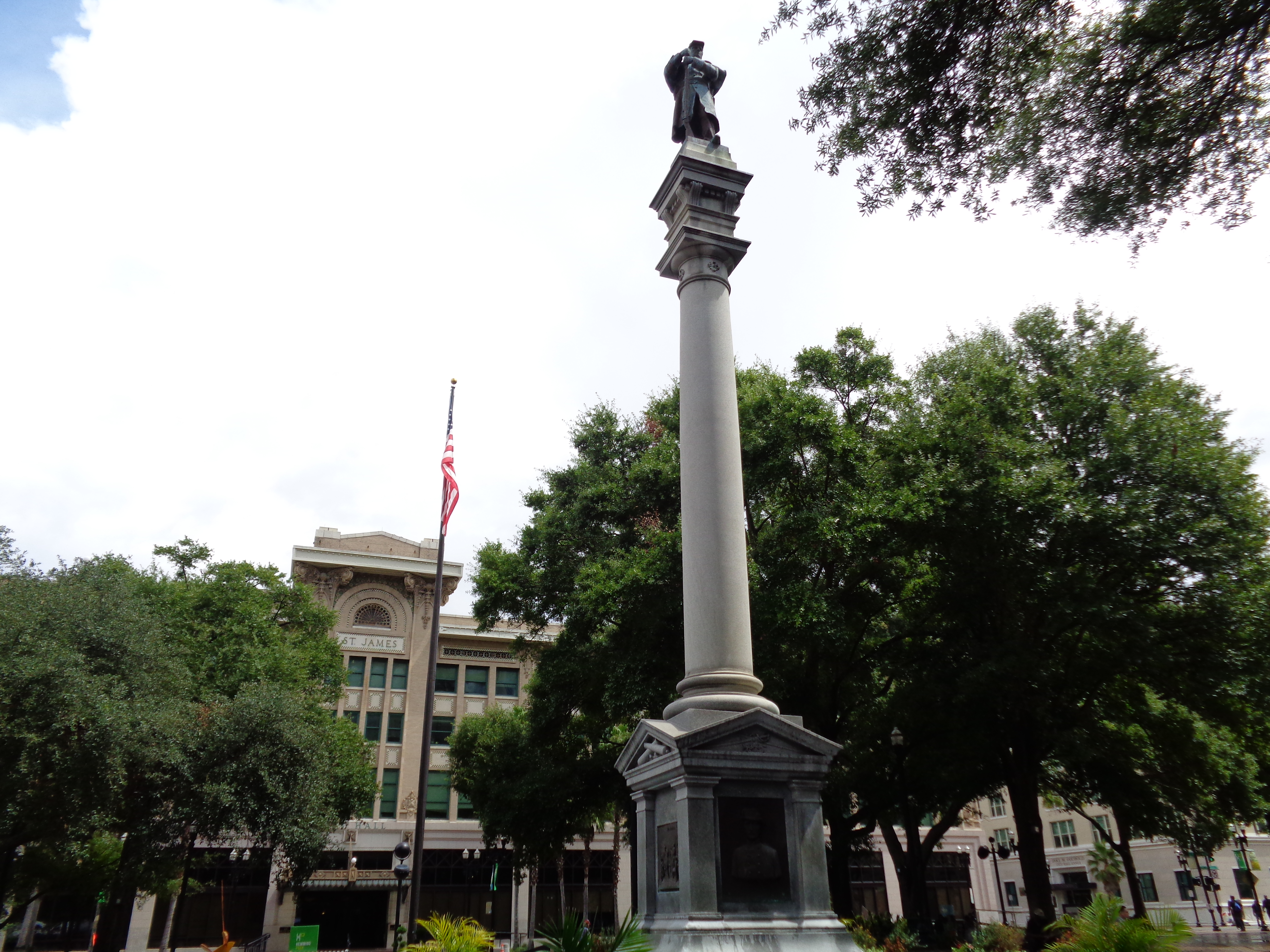
- The monument in 2015
- Location: Jacksonville, Florida, U.S.
- Type: Memorial
- Material: Granite; bronze; marble
- Dedicated date: 1898
- Dedicated to: Confederate Veterans
- Dismantled date: June 2020

The Confederate Memorial (also known as the Confederate Monument and Confederate Soldiers of Florida), was installed in Jacksonville, Florida's Hemming Park, in the United States. The monument was removed in June 2020.

== Description ==
The 59 feet (18 m) tall structure is approximately 4 feet (1.2 m) wide, with a base measuring approximately 3 feet (0.91 m) x 9 feet (2.7 m). The granite shaft is topped with a bronze statue of a young Confederate soldier, who wears a cap, coat, and cape, and stands with his arms resting on a rifle's barrel. Each of the base's four sides have relief panels and carvings. The front plaque has a bust of John Jackson Dickison, and the back plaque features a bust of Edmund Kirby Smith. One of the sides is decorated with an anchor and two crossed oars; the opposite side depicts a battle scene with soldiers on foot and horseback. The memorials is set within a rectangular pool.

One of the inscriptions on the base reads:

TO THE SOLDIERS OF FLORIDA / THIS SHAFT IS BY A COMRADE RAISED IN / TESTIMONY OF HIS LOVE, RECALLING DEEDS / IMMORTAL, HEROISM UNSURPASSED. WITH RANKS UNBROKEN, RAGGED, STARVED / AND DECIMATED, THE SOUTHERN SOLDIER, / FOR DUTY'S SAKE, UNDAUNTED STOOD TO / THE FRONT OF BATTLE UNTIL NO LIGHT / REMAINED TO ILLUMINE THE FIELD OF CAR- / NAGE, SAVE THE LUSTRE OF HIS CHIVALRY / AND COURAGE. / "NOR SHALL YOUR GLORY BE FORGOT / WHILE FAME HER RECORD KEEPS, / OR HONOR POINTS THE HALLOWED SPOT / WHERE VALOR PROUDLY SLEEPS / 1861–1865

== History ==
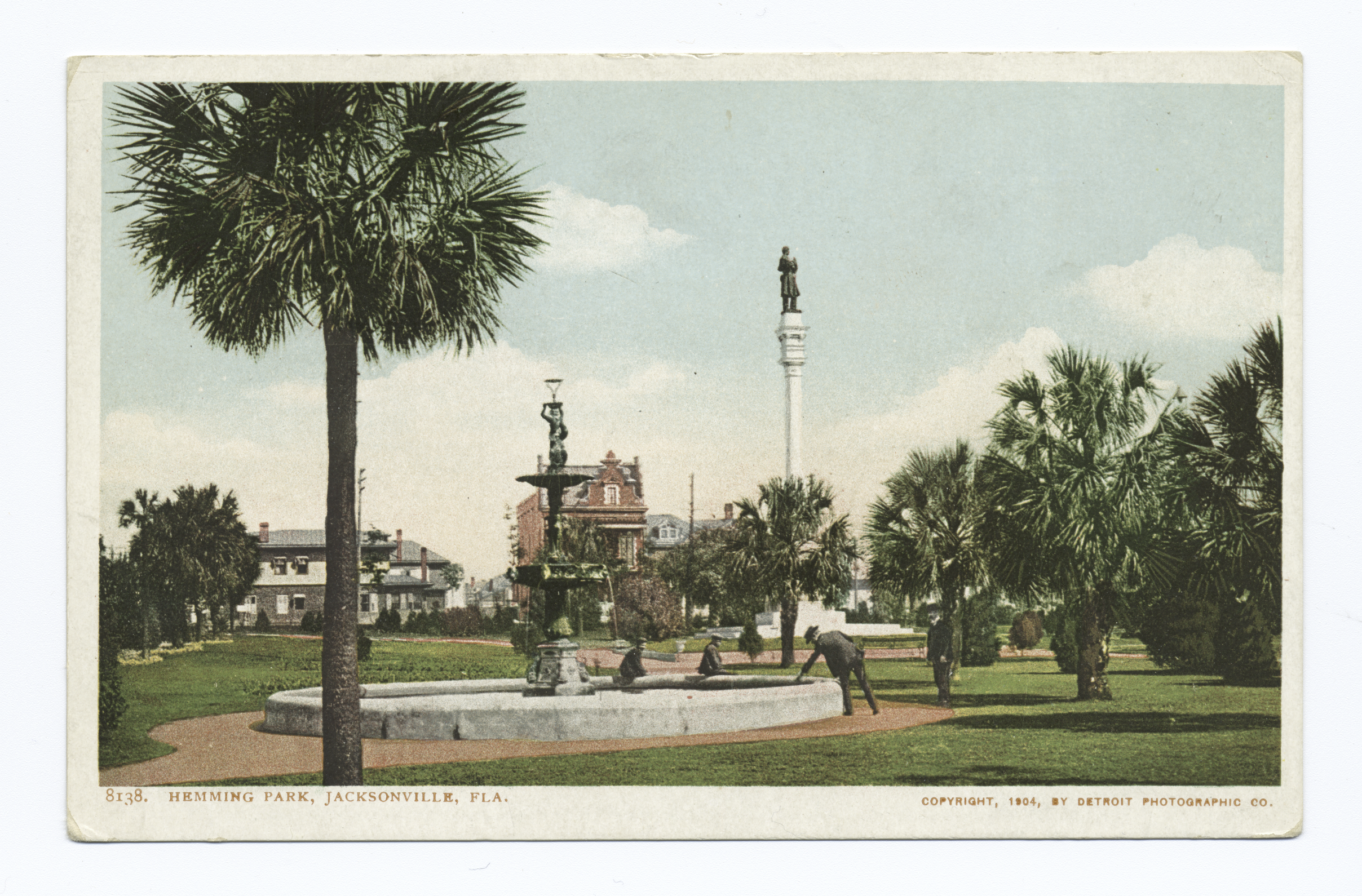
The monument depicted in a postcard of the park

St. James Park in downtown Jacksonville was renamed Hemming Park in 1899 in honor of Civil War veteran Charles C. Hemming, after he installed the 62-foot (19 m)-tall Confederate monument in the park in 1898. Hemming was born in Jacksonville. He later moved to Colorado Springs, Colorado and became a banker, making a fortune. The memorial is the oldest in the city and was the tallest at the time. An occurrence in February 1896 brought lasting change to St. James Park. At the state reunion of United Confederate Veterans (UCV) in Ocala, Charles C. Hemming announced his plan to erect a memorial in honor of Florida's Confederate soldiers.

Though Hemming did not attend the dedication, General Fitzhugh Lee, the nephew of Confederate General Robert E. Lee, was in the reviewing stand, and the grandson of Union General Ulysses S. Grant watched the unveiling from the piazza of the Windsor Hotel. In addition, both northern and southern troops from Camp Cuba Libre attended the ceremony, and much of the oratory concerned the reuniting of the North and South.

The artwork was surveyed by the Smithsonian Institution's "Save Outdoor Sculpture!" program in 1995.

=== Removal ===
On June 9, 2020 the Confederate memorial was taken down after 122 years in the center of the park. In 2025, the Florida Confederate Soldiers Monument was re-erected by Kirby-Smith Camp #1209 Sons of Confederate Veterans.

== See also ==
- List of memorials to Robert E. Lee
- List of monuments and memorials removed during the George Floyd protests
