= J. H. W. Hawkins =

American architect

John Henry Willis Hawkins (1855-1923) was a New York architect who moved to Jacksonville, Florida after the city's Great Fire of 1901. He designed homes for Alexander Sabel, J.E. Cohen, Senator J.P. Taliaferro, W.S. Ware, and Samuel B. Hubbard. Hawkins designed the Herkimer Block at 136 East Bay Street in Downtown Jacksonville as well as the original Guaranty Trust & Savings Bank at 101 East Bay Street. He also designed the Snyder Memorial Methodist Church at 226 North Laura Street, a Dutch Colonial Revival house at 1662 Stockton Street known as A.V.S. Smith Residence and H.S. Griggs Residence at 2956 Riverside Avenue.

== Work ==
- Bostwick Building, Jacksonville
