= Architecture of Jacksonville =

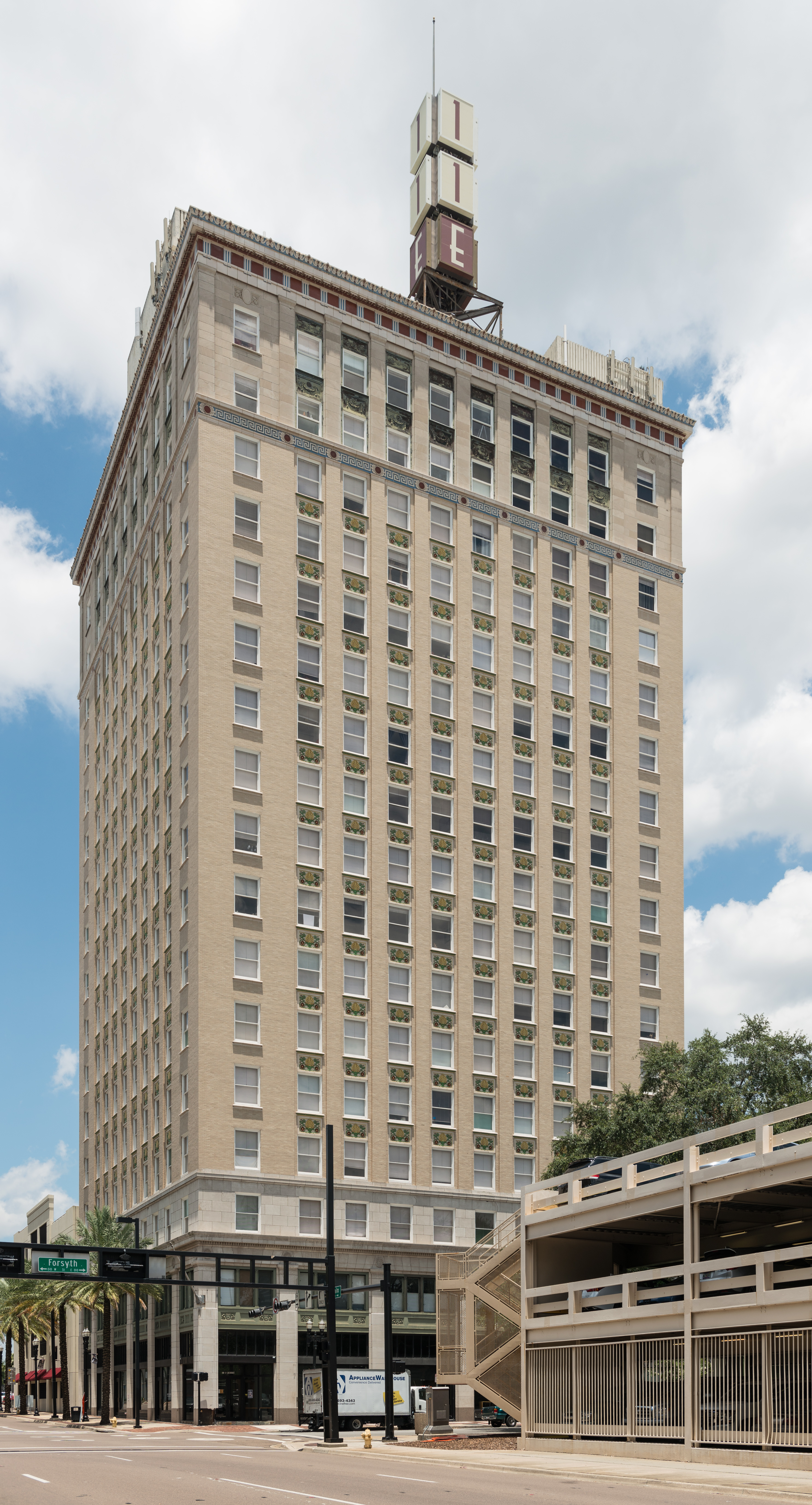
Completed in 1926, 11 East Forsyth is a Chicago school and Art Deco inspired building designed by the architecture firm, Pringle & Smith. Originally named the Lynch Building, it is located on Forsyth Street, near the intersection of Main Street, in the heart of Downtown Jacksonville.

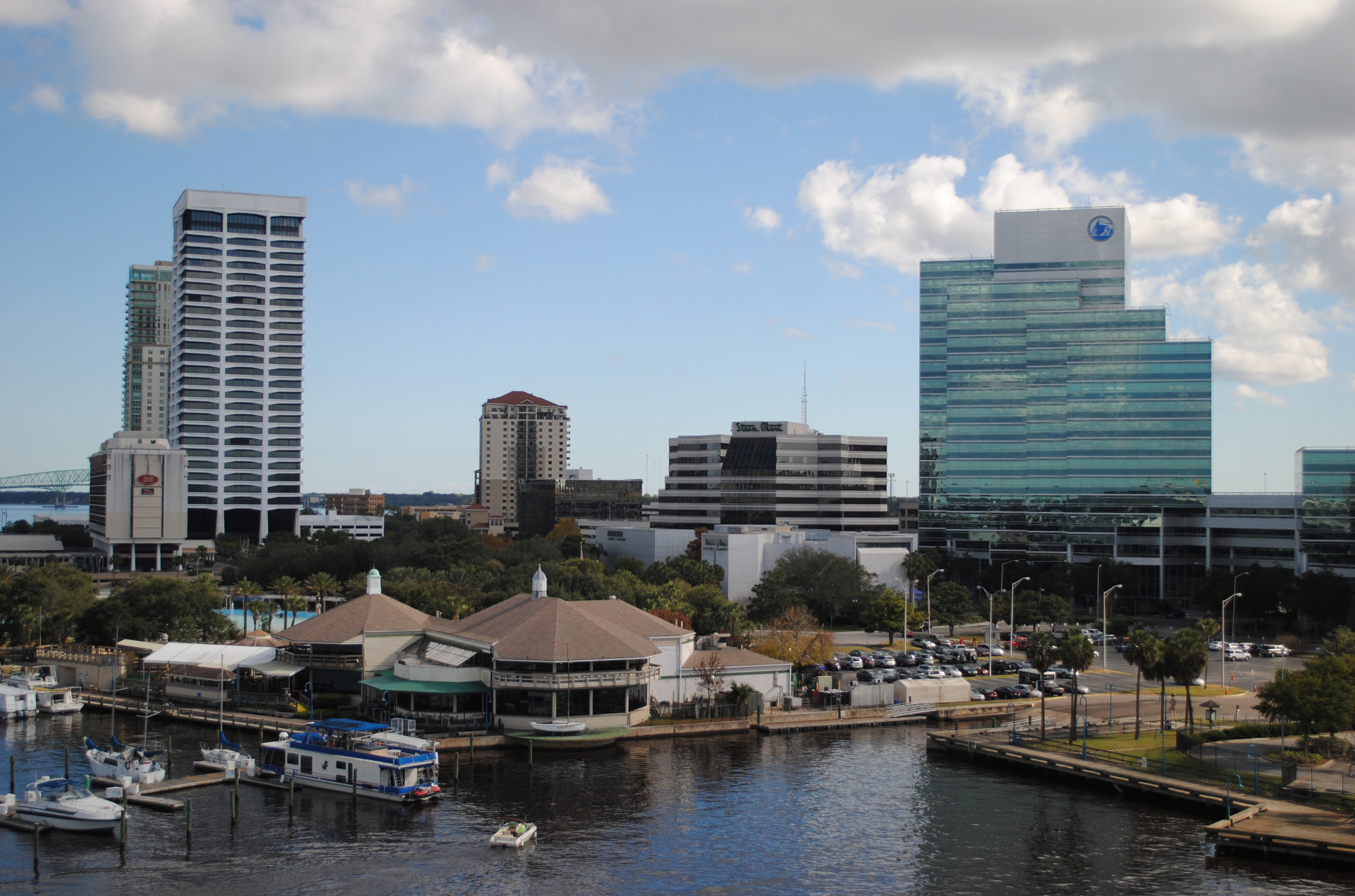
The Southbank business district

The architecture of Jacksonville is a combination of historic and modern styles reflecting the city's early position as a regional center of business. According to the National Trust for Historic Preservation, there are more buildings built before 1967 in Jacksonville than any other city in Florida, though few structures in the city center predate the Great Fire of 1901. Numerous buildings in the city have held state height records, dating as far back as 1902, and last holding a record in 1981.

== Prominent architects ==
Contributing heavily during the reconstruction period following the Great Fire of 1901, a young New York architect named Henry John Klutho would come to influence generations of local designers. Klutho's works exhibit elements influenced by both the Chicago School, championed by Louis Sullivan, and the Prairie School of architecture, popularized by Frank Lloyd Wright. As a result, Jacksonville has one of the largest collections of Prairie Style buildings outside the Midwest.

By the 1950s, modernist design principles would permeate throughout the United States, transforming the rapidly growing State of Florida. During this period, local architects Robert C. Broward, Taylor Hardwick, and William Morgan adapted a range of design principles, including International style, Brutalism, Futurism and Organicism, all applied with an American interpretation generally referred to today as Mid-century modern design. The architecture firms of Reynolds, Smith & Hills (RS&H) and Kemp, Bunch & Jackson (KBJ) have also contributed a number of important works to the city's modern architectural movement. In particular, KBJ has designed more buildings in the contemporary skyline of Jacksonville than any other architectural firm. Of the 30 tallest buildings in the city, 17 are associated with KBJ. With the notable exception of works by Robert A.M. Stern Architects, Welton Becket, Paul Rudolph, and Helmut Jahn, many of Jacksonville's modern landmarks were designed locally.

== Residential architecture ==
=== Houses ===
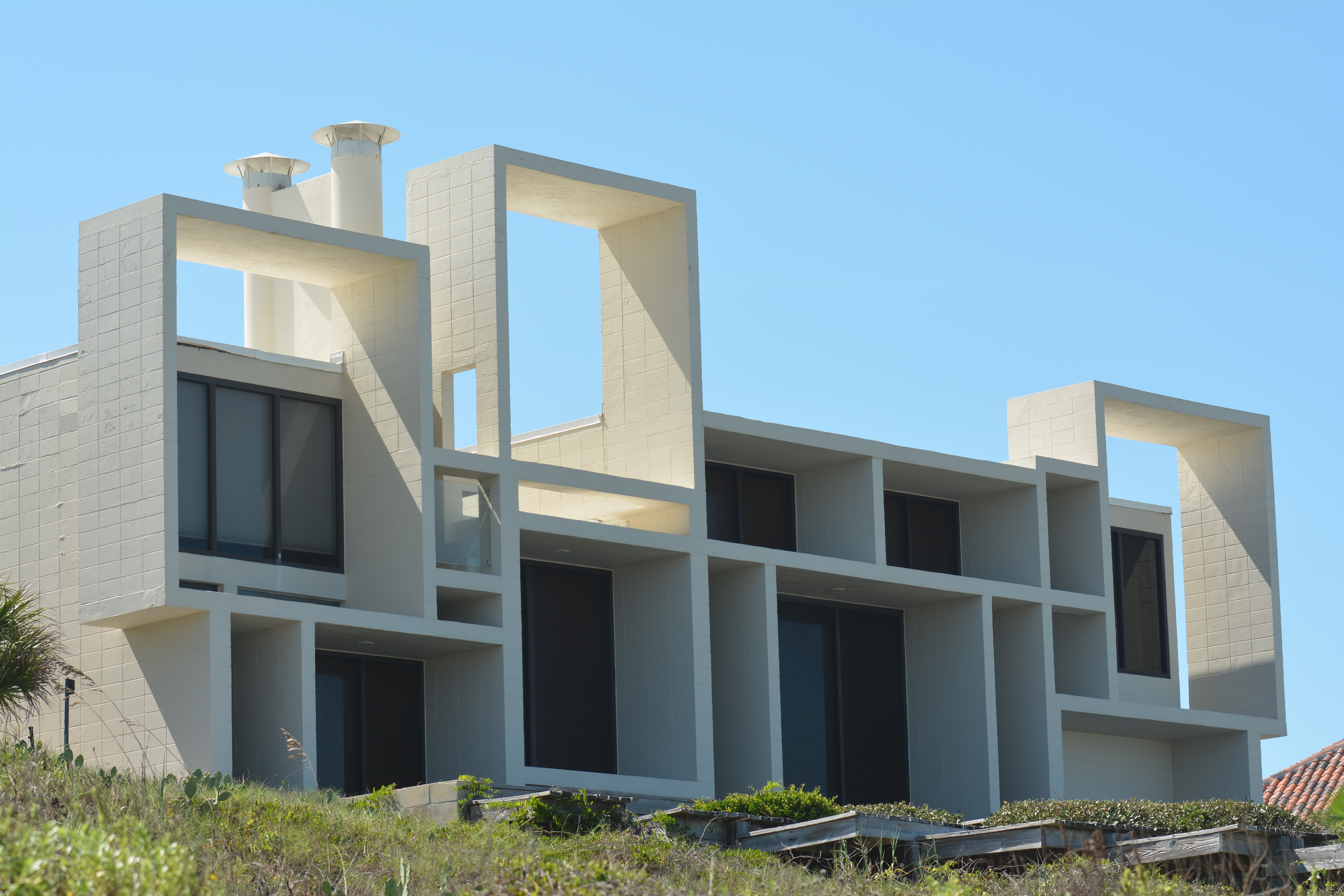
The Milam Residence, designed by Paul Rudolph (1961)

Few structures survive from the earliest period of Jacksonville's history, though there are a handful of notable exceptions. Built in 1797, Kingsley Plantation is the oldest surviving structure in the city and is currently maintained by the National Park Service as part of the Timucuan Ecological and Historic Preserve. Located on Fort George Island, the plantation is a unique two-story house that resembles 17th century British gentry homes. The Red Bank Plantation House is a Georgian Revival style structure built in 1854. Marabanong Mansion is a Queen Anne style home built in 1876. Napoleon Bonaparte Broward House, built in 1878, and the Merrill House, built in 1886, are two examples of Victorian style homes in Jacksonville.

The Great Fire of 1901 consumed much of central Jacksonville, leaving thousands homeless, and simultaneously sparked a significant period of growth lasting up until the end of the Florida Land Boom. Springfield, Riverside, Avondale, Eastside, Oakland and Fairfield had been platted and annexed into the city prior to the fire, and experienced much of the related growth after the disaster. Architect Henry John Klutho would become a popular figure in the reconstruction of Jacksonville, contributing his designs to many of the new structures, including dwellings. Built in 1902, The Thomas V. Porter House is a Classical Revival and Colonial Revival style mansion designed by Klutho. He is better known for his works in the Prairie School style of architecture. His own home, Henry John Klutho House, is a prime example. The architecture firm of Marsh & Saxelbye would also establish itself during this period of growth. In 1925, the firm designed the Tudor Revival style Lane-Towers House. More famously, Epping Forest, completed in 1927, is a Spanish Colonial Revival style mansion designed by Marsh & Saxelbye.

Following World War II, suburbs rapidly developed throughout the United States, due in large part to the rise of personal automobile ownership. Following the opening of the Mathews Bridge, Arlington would become the most important of these developments locally. This period also coincided with the popularization of Modern design in architecture. Designed by Robert C. Broward, the Butterfly House was completed in 1957 in the Arlington neighborhood. Its design elements, including the butterfly wing shaped roof, are sometime more broadly categorized today as Mid-century modern design. The Jacksonville Beaches also host a number of modern homes built during this period. Famed architect Paul Rudolph designed the iconic Milam House in 1961, which is on the National Register of Historic Places. William Morgan designed the Williamson House in 1966, and his own home, Morgan House, in 1974. Both are located on the beach.

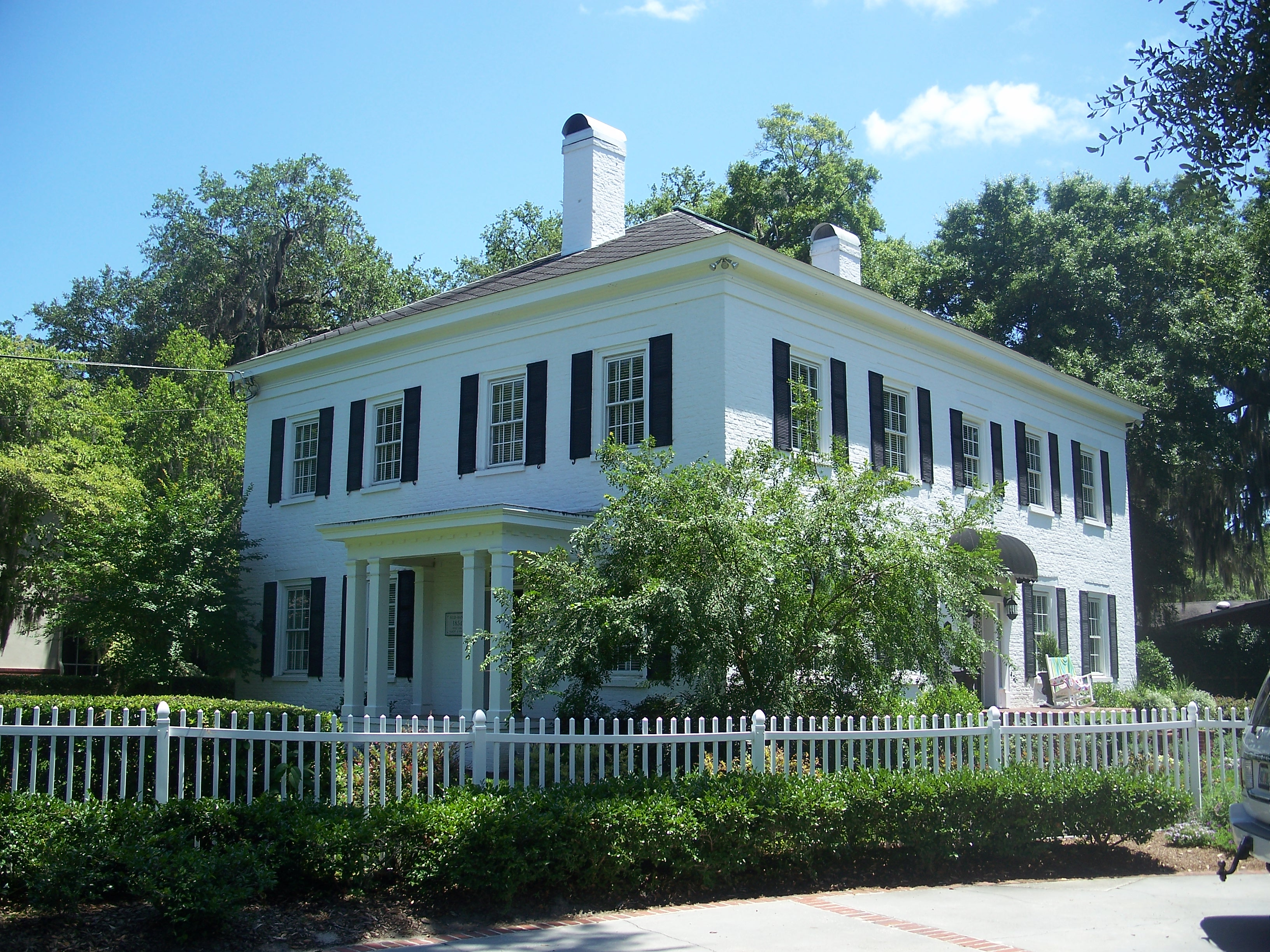
Red Bank Plantation House, Georgian style.

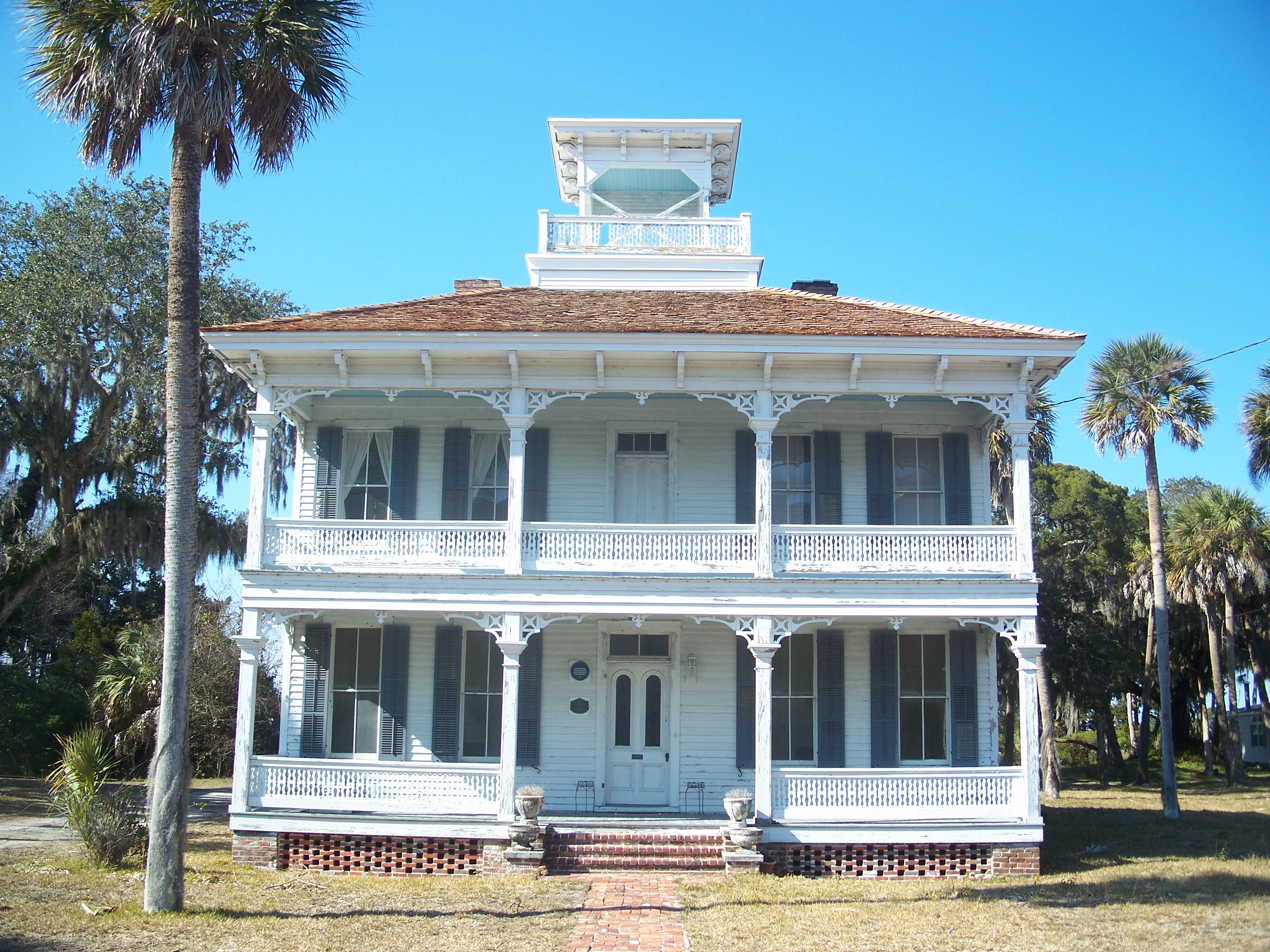
19th century Napoleon Bonaparte Broward House on Fort George Island.

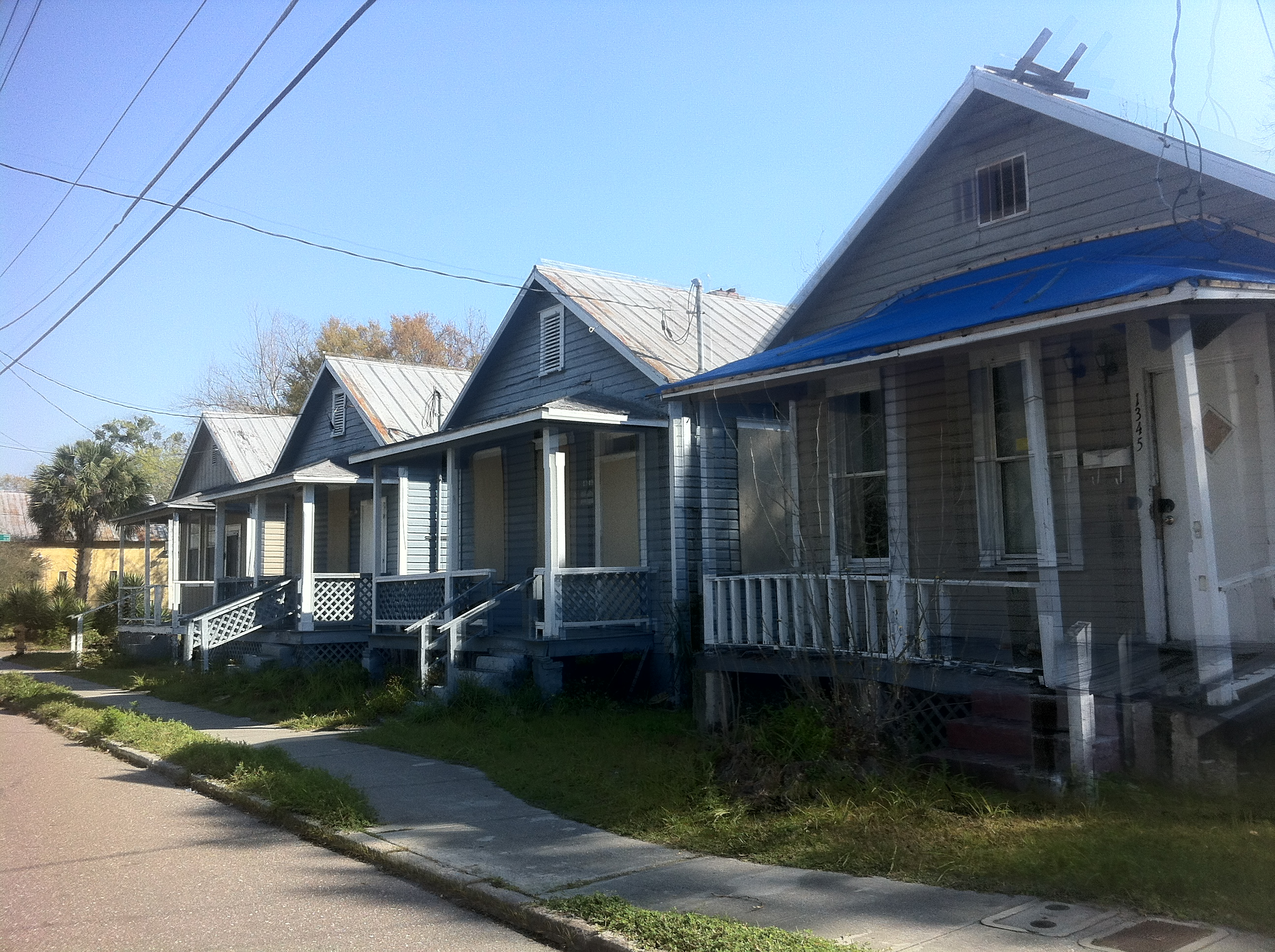
Shotgun houses on Cleveland Avenue in Durkeeville, Mid-Westside.

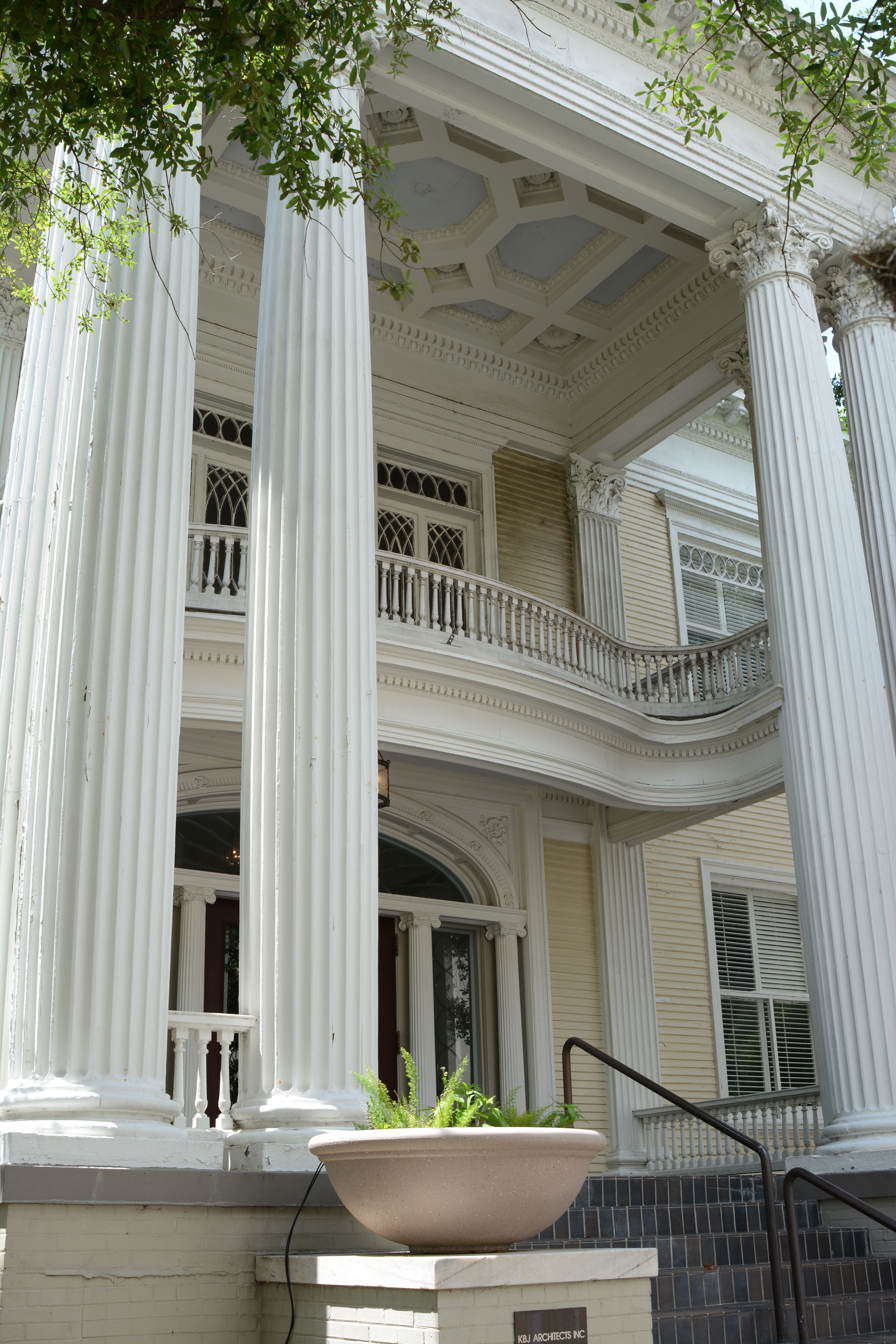
Thomas V. Porter House, located downtown.

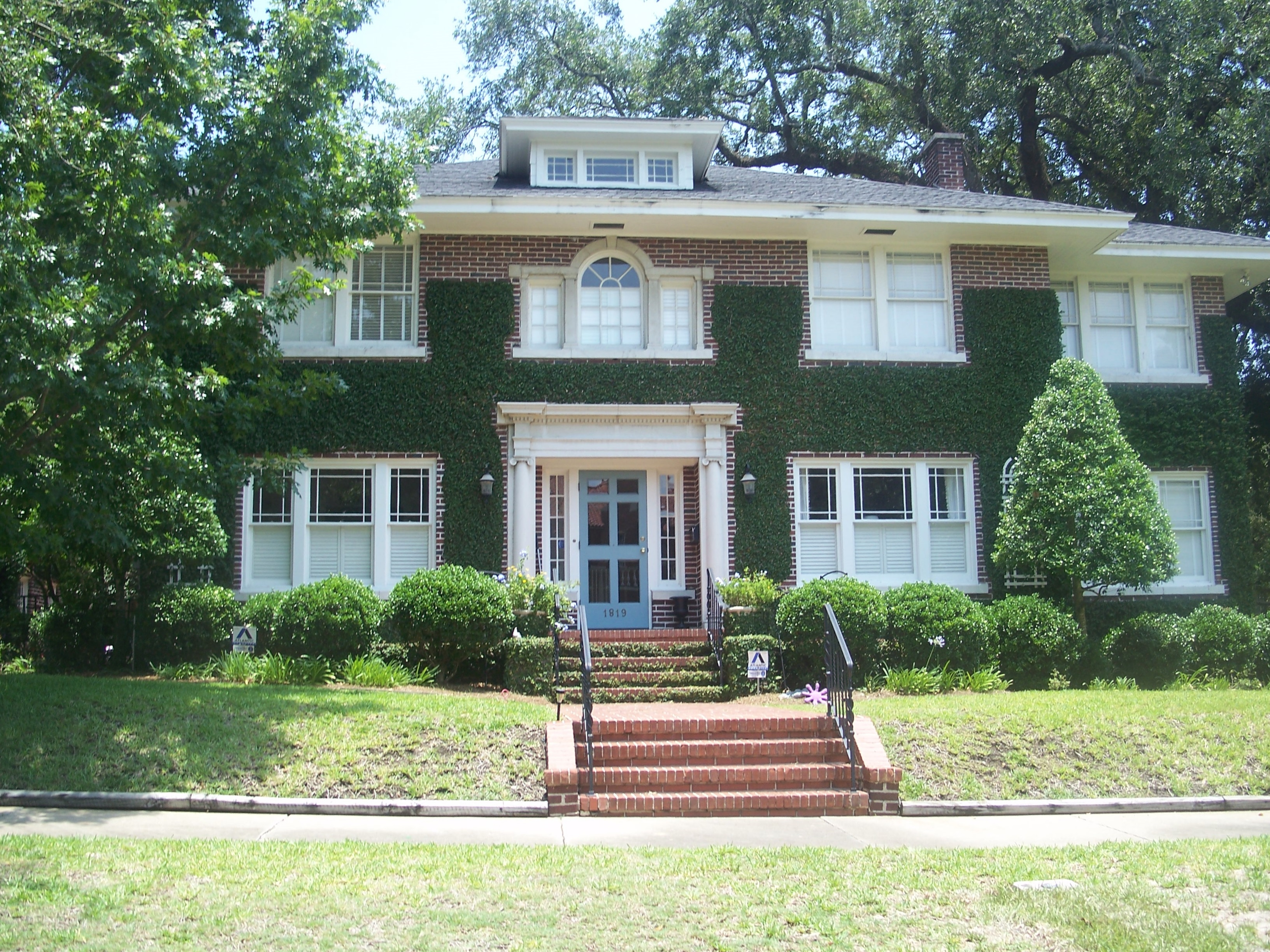
Home in Riverside and Avondale.

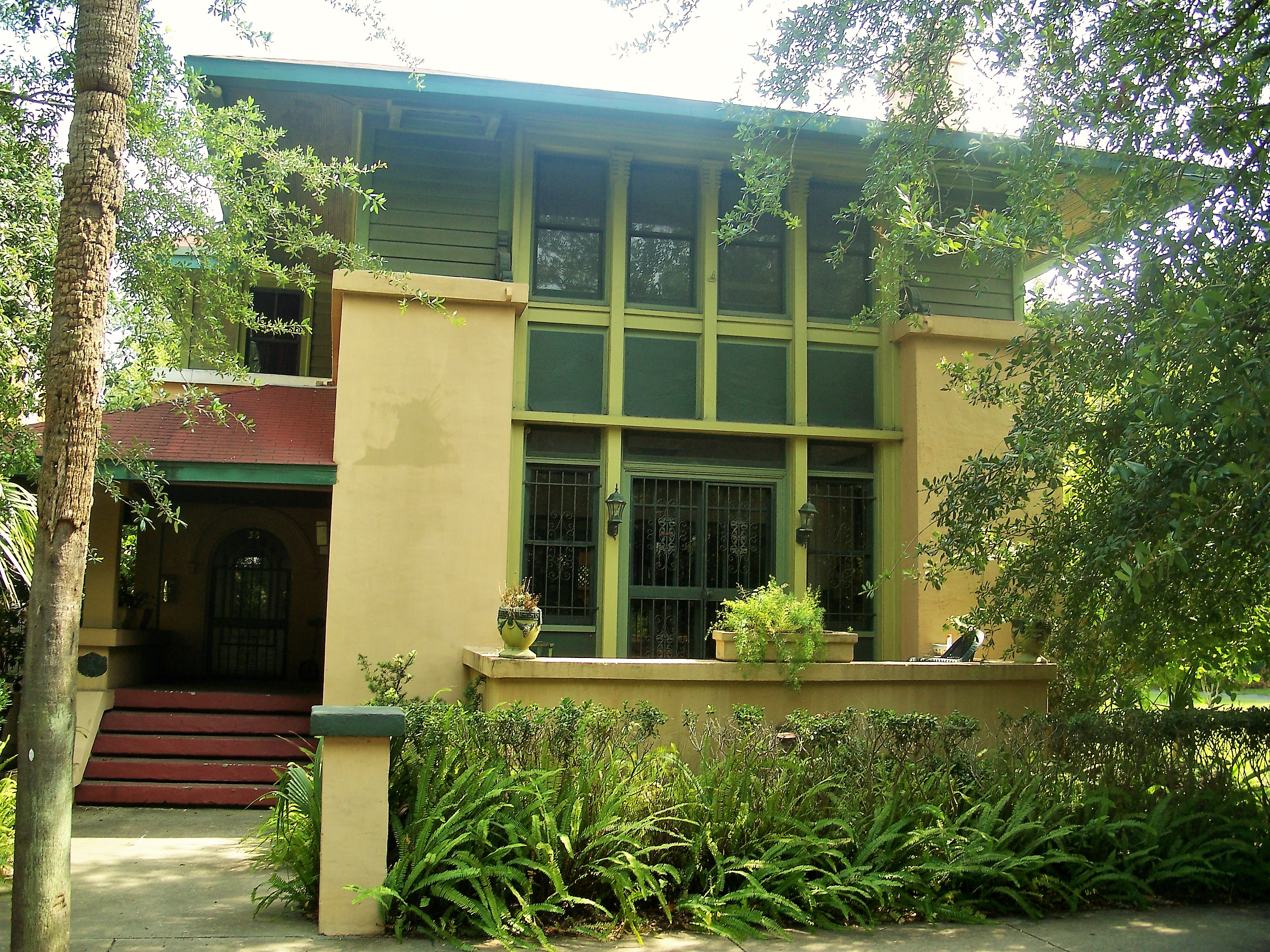
Henry John Klutho House, a Prairie style home in Springfield.

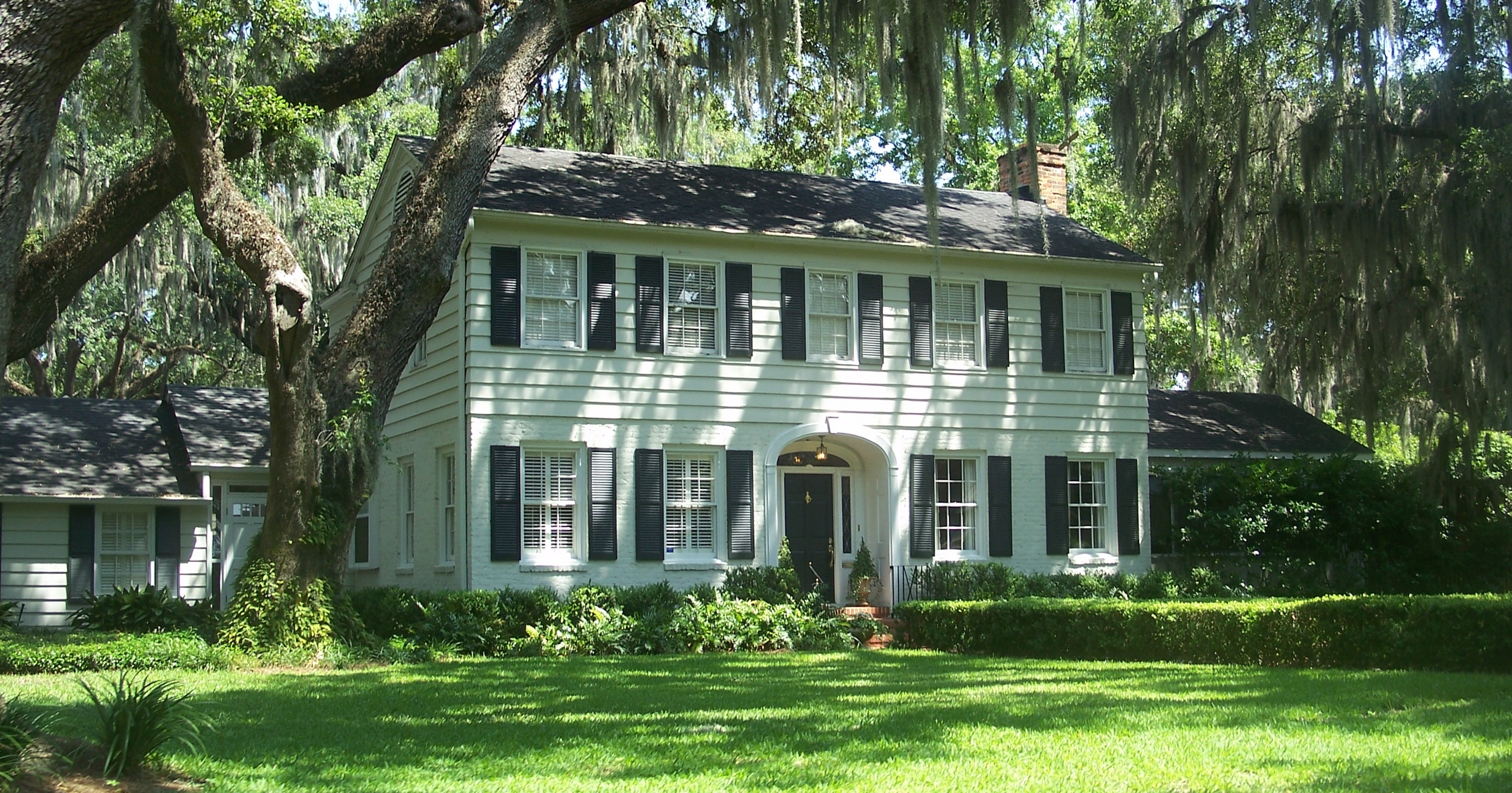
Classical Revival residence in Ortega.

=== Apartments and condominiums ===
- 1913 Klutho Apartments, Prairie School, Henry John Klutho
- 1923 John Gorrie, Renaissance Revival, Roy A. Benjamin and Mellen Clark Greeley (originally the John Gorrie Junior High School)
- 1924 310 West Church Street Apartments, Georgian Revival/Beaux-Arts, Hentz, Reid & Adler (originally the Ambassador Hotel)
- 1925 The Carling, Renaissance Revival, Thompson, Holmes & Converse
- 1926 11 East Forsyth, Chicago school/Art Deco, Pringle & Smith (originally the Lynch Building)
- 1949 City Place, Moderne
- 1967 The Commander, Mid-century modern
- 1968 Cathedral Towers, Brutalist, Kemp, Bunch & Jackson
- 1970 Cathedral Townhouse, Brutalist, Kemp, Bunch & Jackson
- 1972 Mount Carmel Garden Apartments, Brutalist
- 1973 Riverside Presbyterian Apartments, Brutalist
- 1974 Cathedral Terrace, Brutalist, Kemp, Bunch & Jackson
- 1974 Hogan Creek Tower, Brutalist
- 2003 Berkman Plaza
- 2006 The Strands at St. Johns Center
- 2006 San Marco Place
- 2008 The Peninsula at St. Johns Center, Postmodern,
- 2015 220 Riverside, Modernist,
- 2016 Brooklyn Riverside Apartments, Modernist,
- 2018 Lofts at LaVilla, Modernist
- 2018 Lofts at Monroe, Modernist
- 2018 Broadstone River House, Modernist
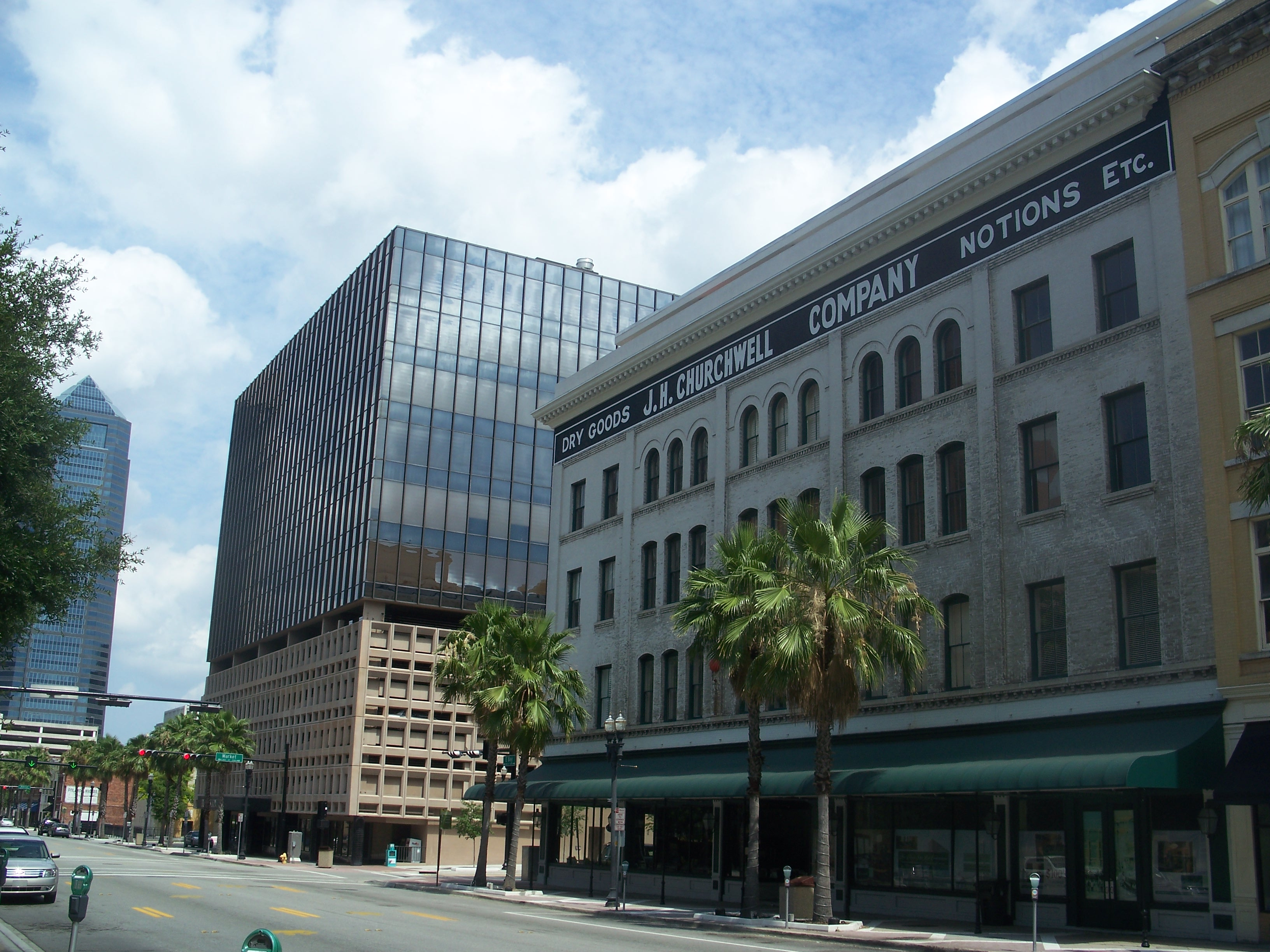
Churchwell Building on East Bay Street

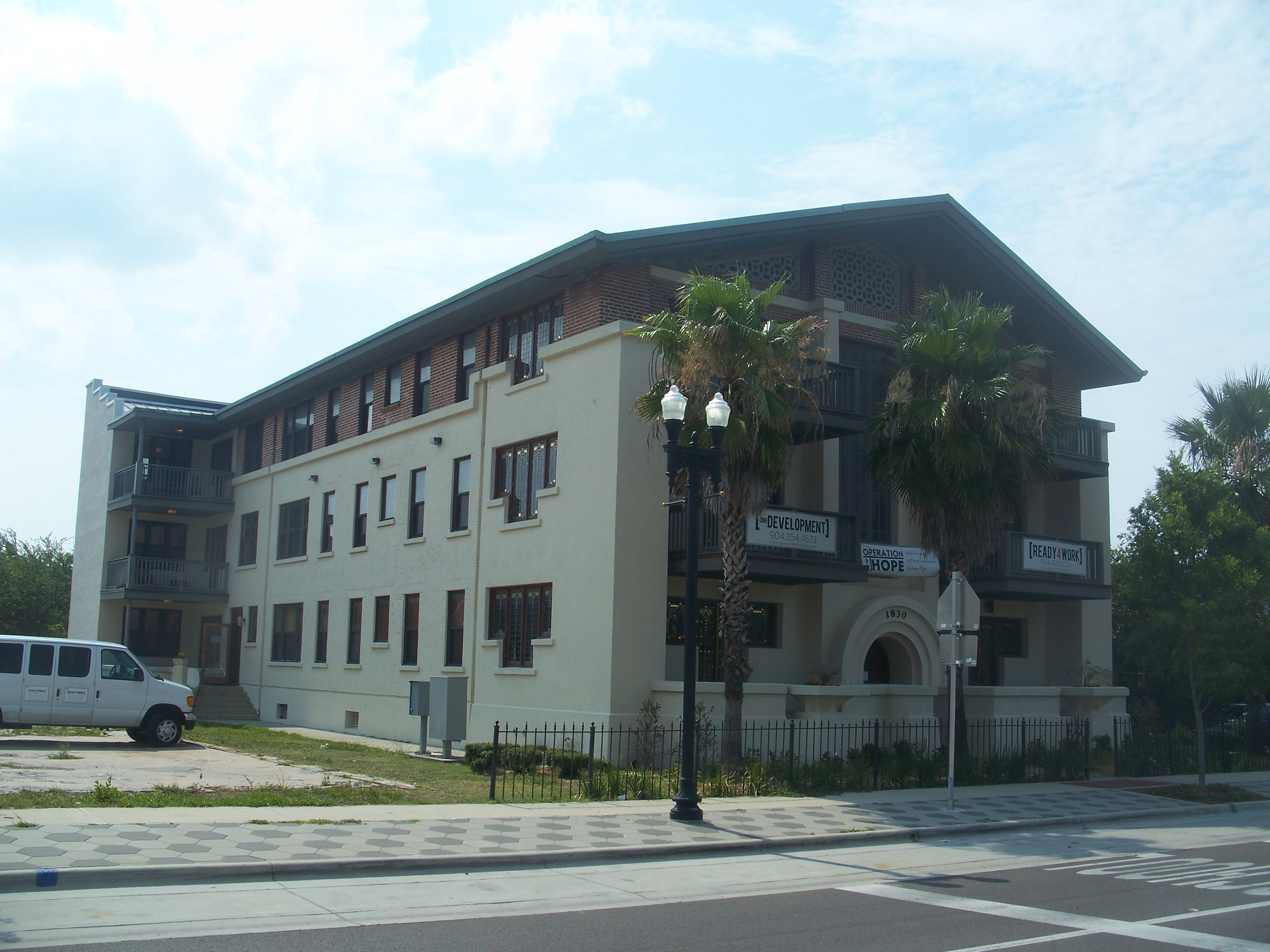
Klutho Apartments in Springfield.

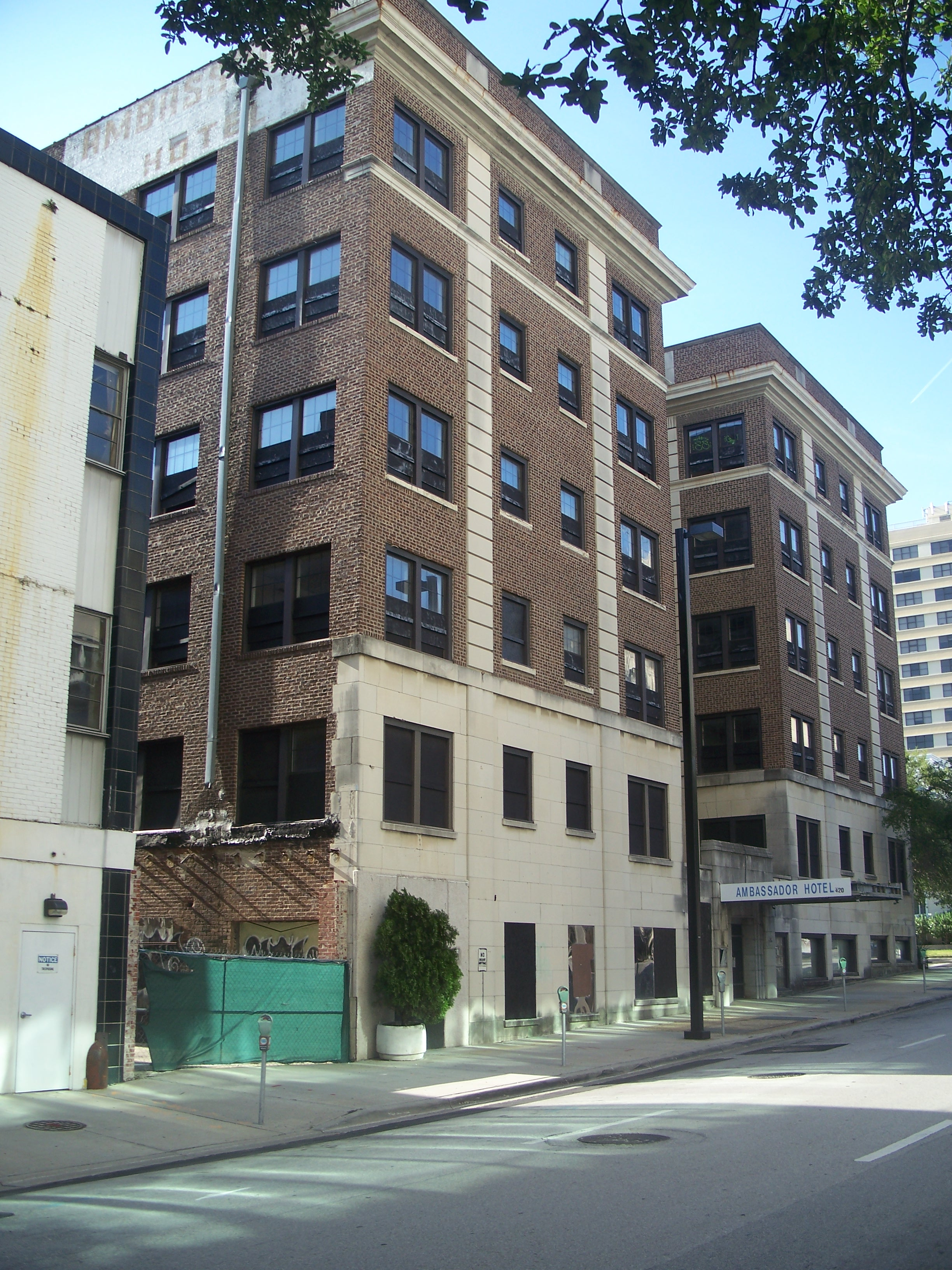
310 West Church Street Apartments (former Ambassador Hotel) in Northbank, Downtown.

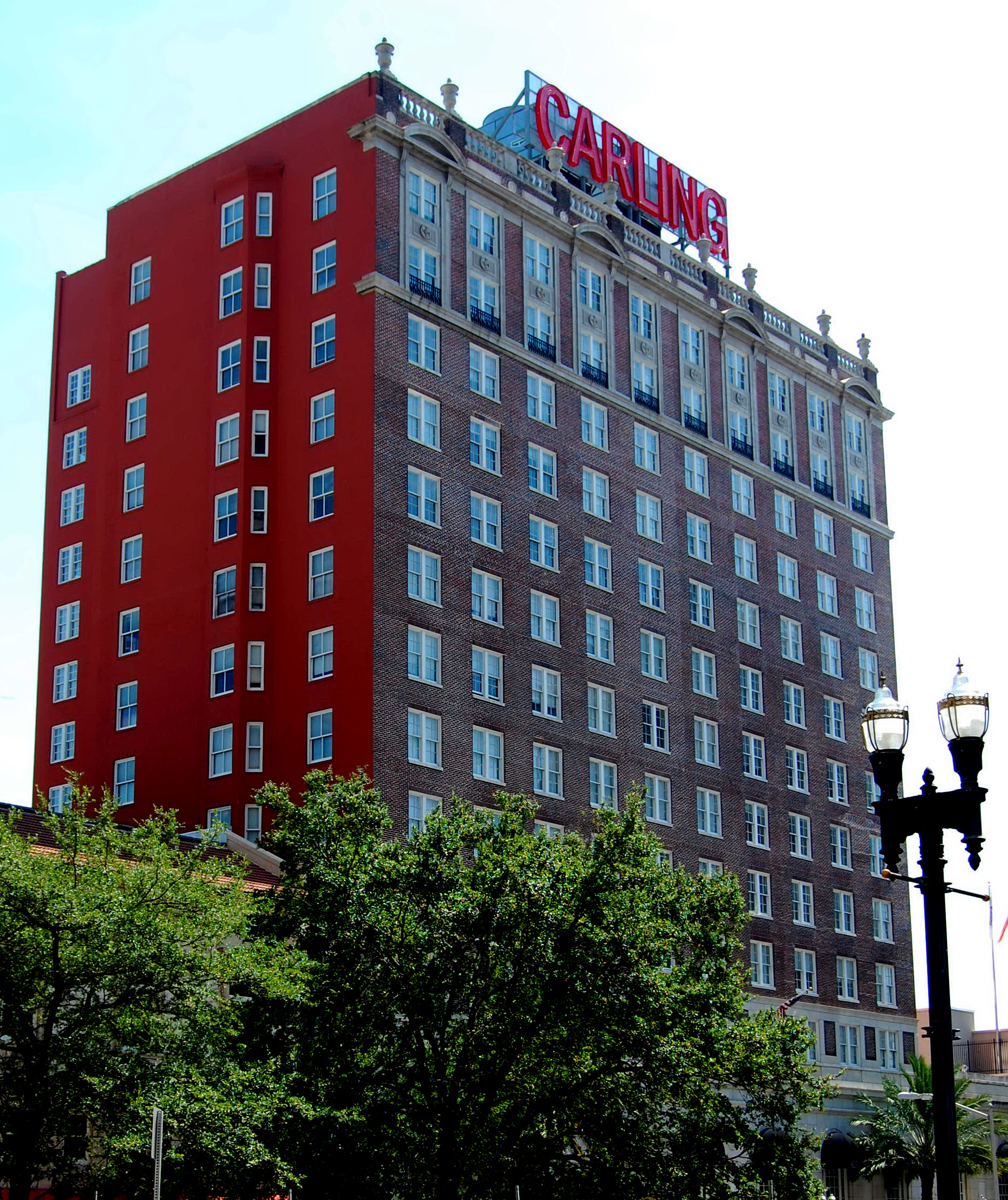
The Carling (former Hotel Roosevelt) in Northbank, Downtown

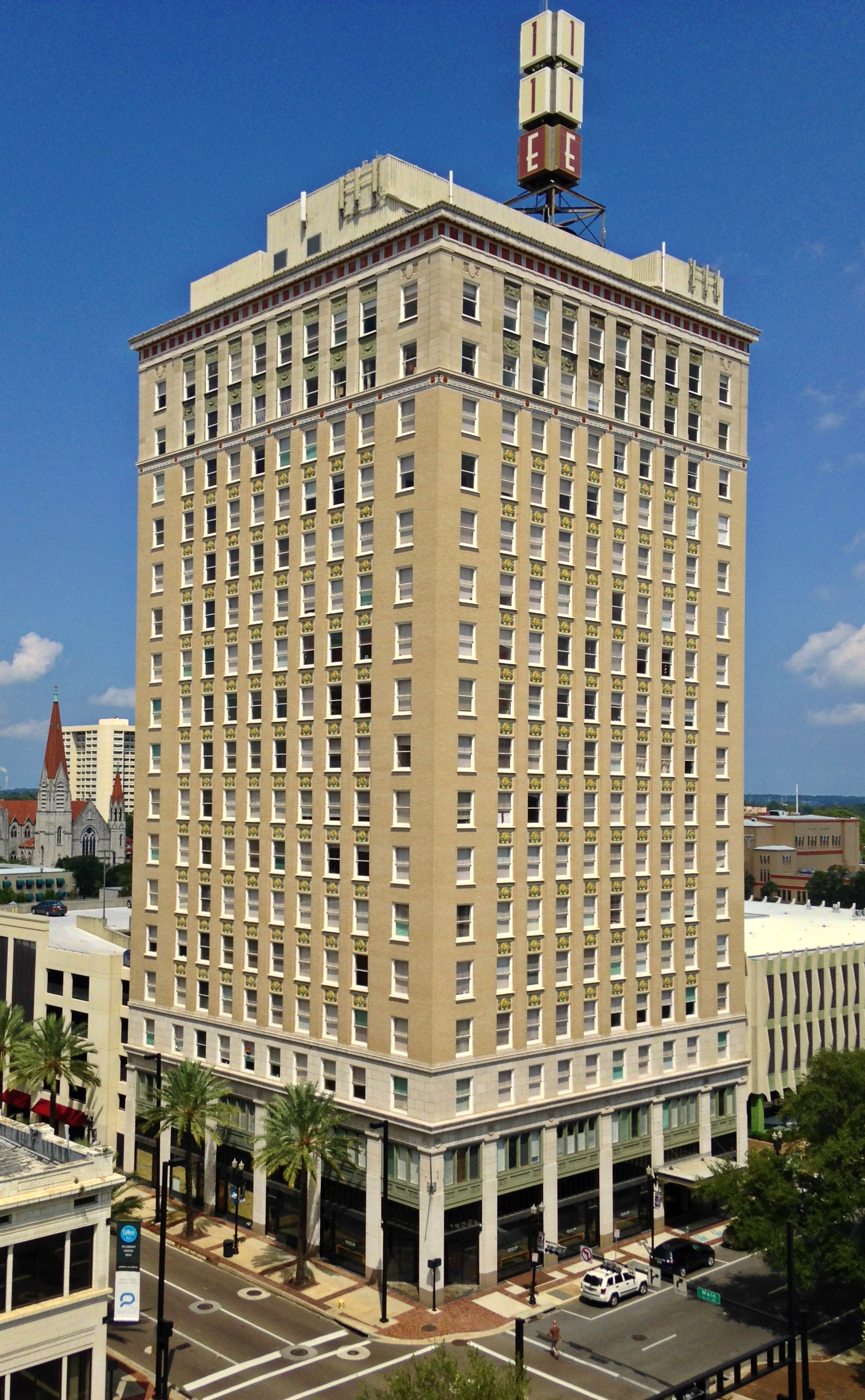
11 East Forsyth

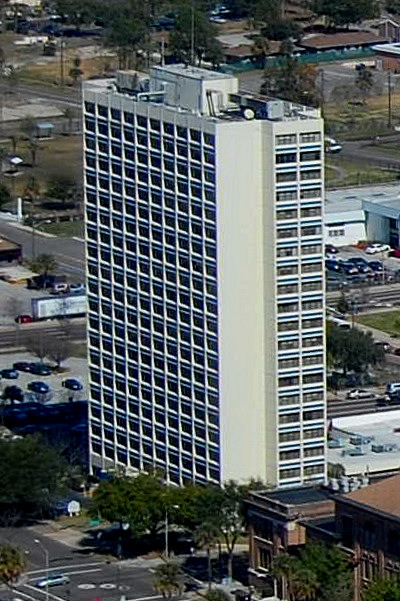
20th century Brutalist style residential towers in Northbank, Downtown.

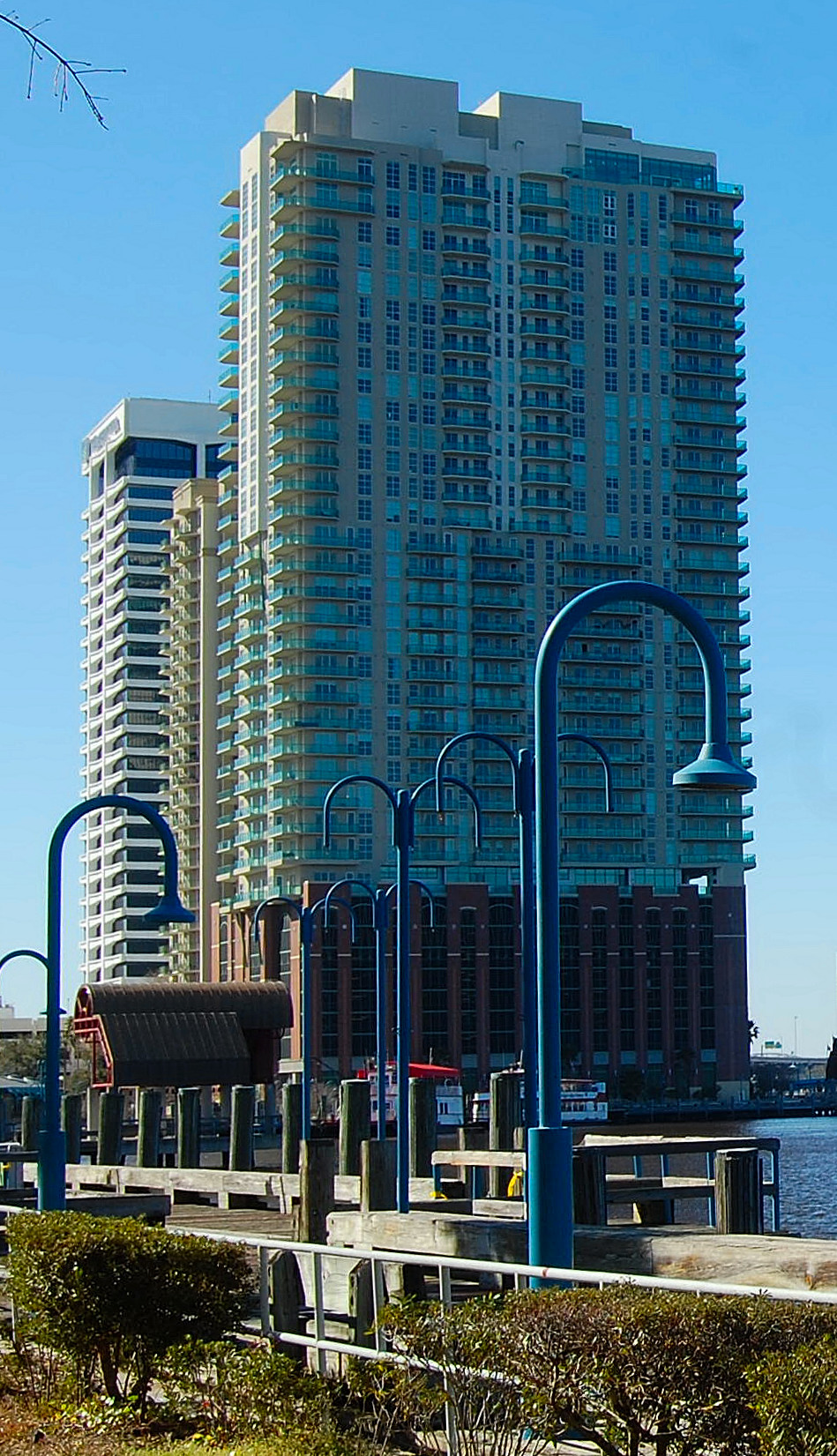
High-rise condominiums on the Southbank, Downtown waterfront.

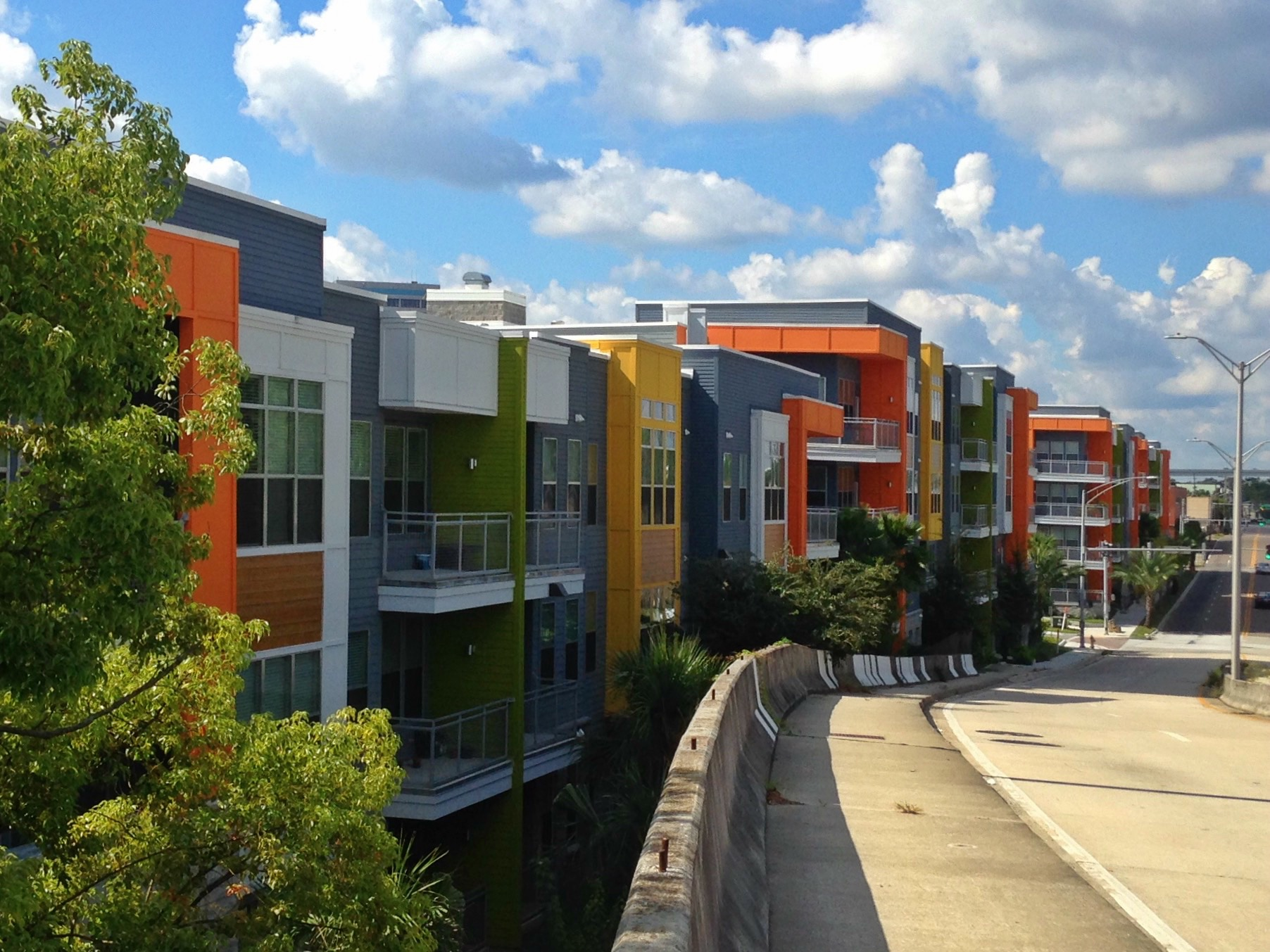
Apartments in the Brooklyn neighborhood

== Commercial architecture ==
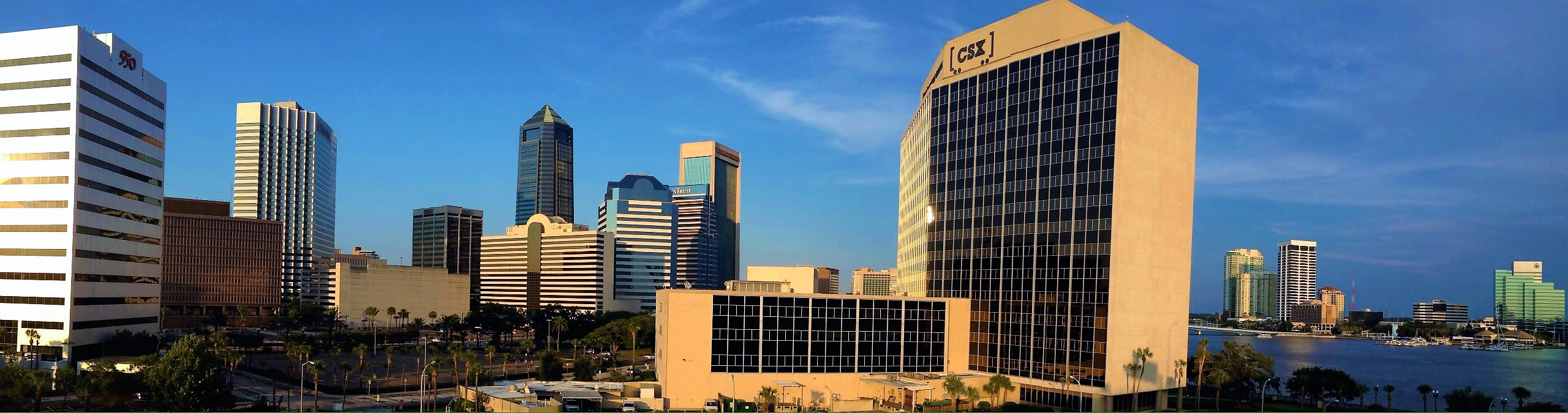
The Downtown Jacksonville skyline

=== Places of business ===
- 1889 El Modelo Block
- 1902 Old Florida National Bank, Classical Revival, Edward H. Glidden (originally the Mercantile Exchange Bank Building)
- 1902 Plaza Hotel (Jacksonville), Oxford Ink Tattoo, Dr. Bexley (originally Chief Surgeon General's Quarters in 1832 before it burned down in 1901)
- 1902 Dyal-Upchurch Building, Chicago school, Henry John Klutho
- 1908 Bisbee Building, Chicago school/Prairie School, Henry John Klutho
- 1909 121 Atlantic Place, Chicago school/Classical Revival, Mowbray and Uffinger (originally the Atlantic National Bank Building)
- 1910 Morocco Temple, Egyptian Revival/Prairie School, Henry John Klutho
- 1911 Florida Life Building, Chicago school/Prairie School, Henry John Klutho
- 1912 Masonic Temple, Chicago school/Prairie School, Mark and Sheftall
- 1925 Groover-Stewart Drug Company Building, Marsh & Saxelbye
- 1926 Scottish Rite Masonic Center, Egyptian Revival/Art Deco, Roy A. Benjamin
- 1926 Schultz Building, Chicago school/Classical Revival, Marsh & Saxelbye
- 1926 Barnett National Bank Building, Chicago school, Mowbray and Uffinger
- 1926 Elks Club Building, Mediterranean Revival, Roy A. Benjamin
- 1927 Levy Building, Chicago school/Renaissance Revival, Marsh & Saxelbye
- 1927 Hildebrandt Building, Chicago school/Renaissance Revival, Marsh & Saxelbye
- 1928 Greenleaf & Crosby Building, Chicago school/Renaissance Revival, Marsh & Saxelbye
- 1929 Title & Trust Company of Florida Building, Classical Revival, Marsh & Saxelbye
- 1941 First Federal Savings and Loan Building, Art Deco
- 1941 Furchgott Building, Art Deco,
- 1951 Jacksonville Transportation Authority Headquarters, Art Deco (originally the Atlantic National Bank Annex)
- 1953 Old Peninsular Life Insurance Building, International style, Kemp, Bunch & Jackson (occupied by Fidelity National Financial)
- 1955 Eight Forty One, International Style, Kemp, Bunch & Jackson (originally the Prudential Building)
- 1955 Old Independent Life Building, International Style, Kemp, Bunch & Jackson
- 1957 Midtown Centre, International Style/Mid-century modern, Ira Koger (originally the Koger Center)
- 1958 Skinner Dairy, Mid-century modern, Taylor Hardwick
- 1960 CSX Transportation Building, International Style/Mid-century modern, Kemp, Bunch & Jackson (originally the Atlantic Coast Line Railroad Building)
- 1963 JEA Tower, Mid-century modern, Ketchum & Sharp (originally the Universal-Marion Building)
- 1965 Jessie Ball duPont Center, Mid-century modern, Taylor Hardwick
- 1967 Riverplace Tower, International Style/Mid-century modern, Welton Becket, in association with Kemp, Bunch & Jackson (originally the Gulf Life Building)
- 1967 Times-Union Building, International Style/Mid-century modern, Kemp, Bunch & Jackson
- 1971 Blue Cross Blue Shield Building, Brutalist, Kemp, Bunch & Jackson
- 1974 Wells Fargo Center, Modernist, Kemp, Bunch & Jackson (originally the Independent Life Building)
- 1974 BB&T Building, Modernist, Kemp, Bunch & Jackson (originally the Atlantic National Bank Building)
- 1982 Chart House, Organic/Modernist, Kendrick Bangs Kellogg
- 1983 EverBank Center, Modernist, Kemp, Bunch & Jackson (originally the Southern Bell Tower)
- 1985 Two Prudential Plaza, Modernist, Kemp, Bunch & Jackson
- 1985 Stein Mart Building, Modernist, Kemp, Bunch & Jackson
- 1986 One Enterprise Center, Postmodern, Clark Tribble Harris & Li Architects (originally the Florida National Bank Building)
- 1986 Baptist Medical Pavilion, Brutalist,
- 1989 VyStar Tower, Postmodern, Kemp, Bunch & Jackson (originally the American Heritage Life Building)
- 1990 Bank of America Tower, Postmodern, Helmut Jahn (originally the Barnett Center)
- 2003 Raymond James Building, Postmodern, Jess Walker of Morris Adjmi Architects
- 2008 EverBank Plaza, Postmodern
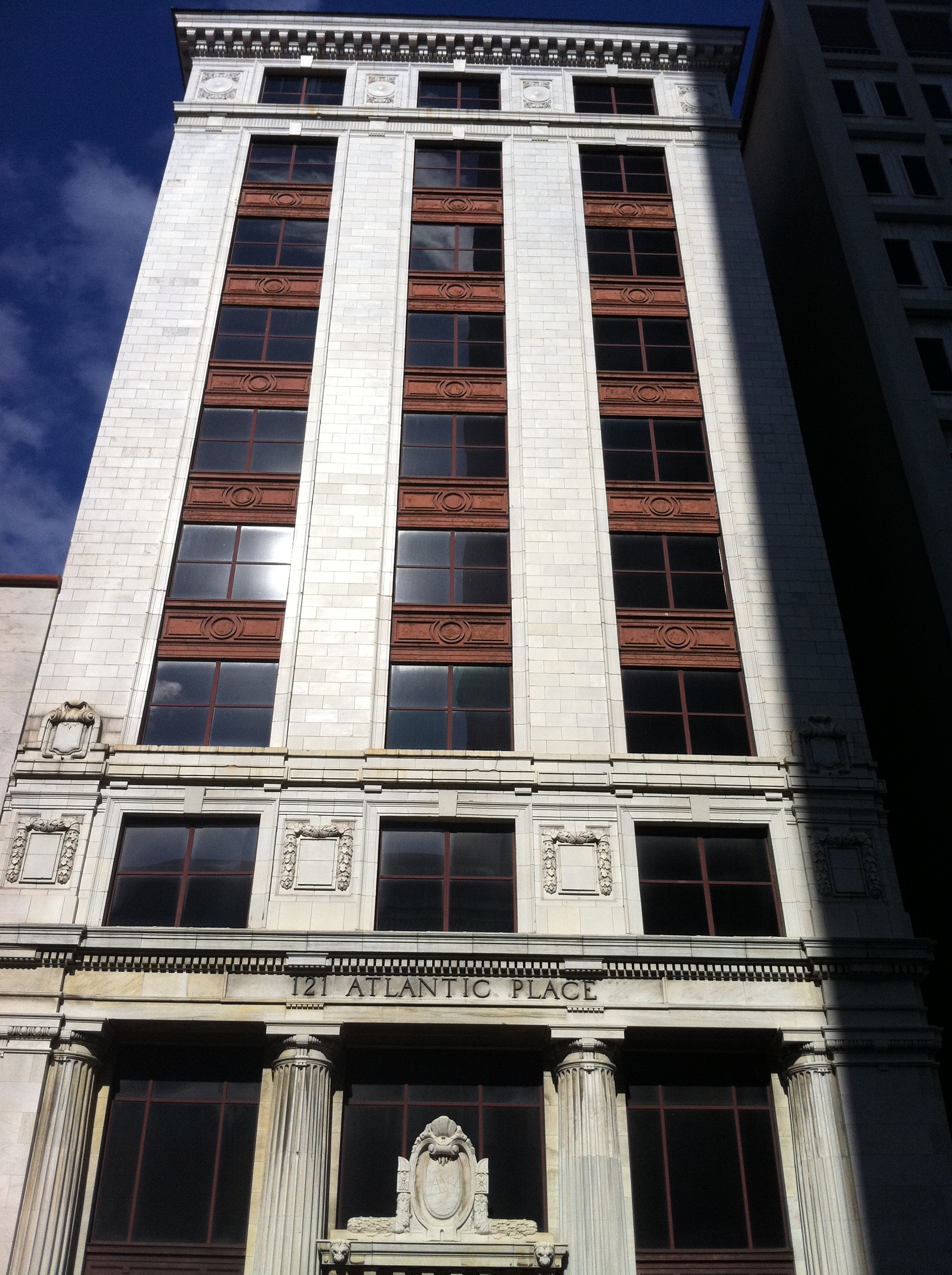
121 Atlantic Place

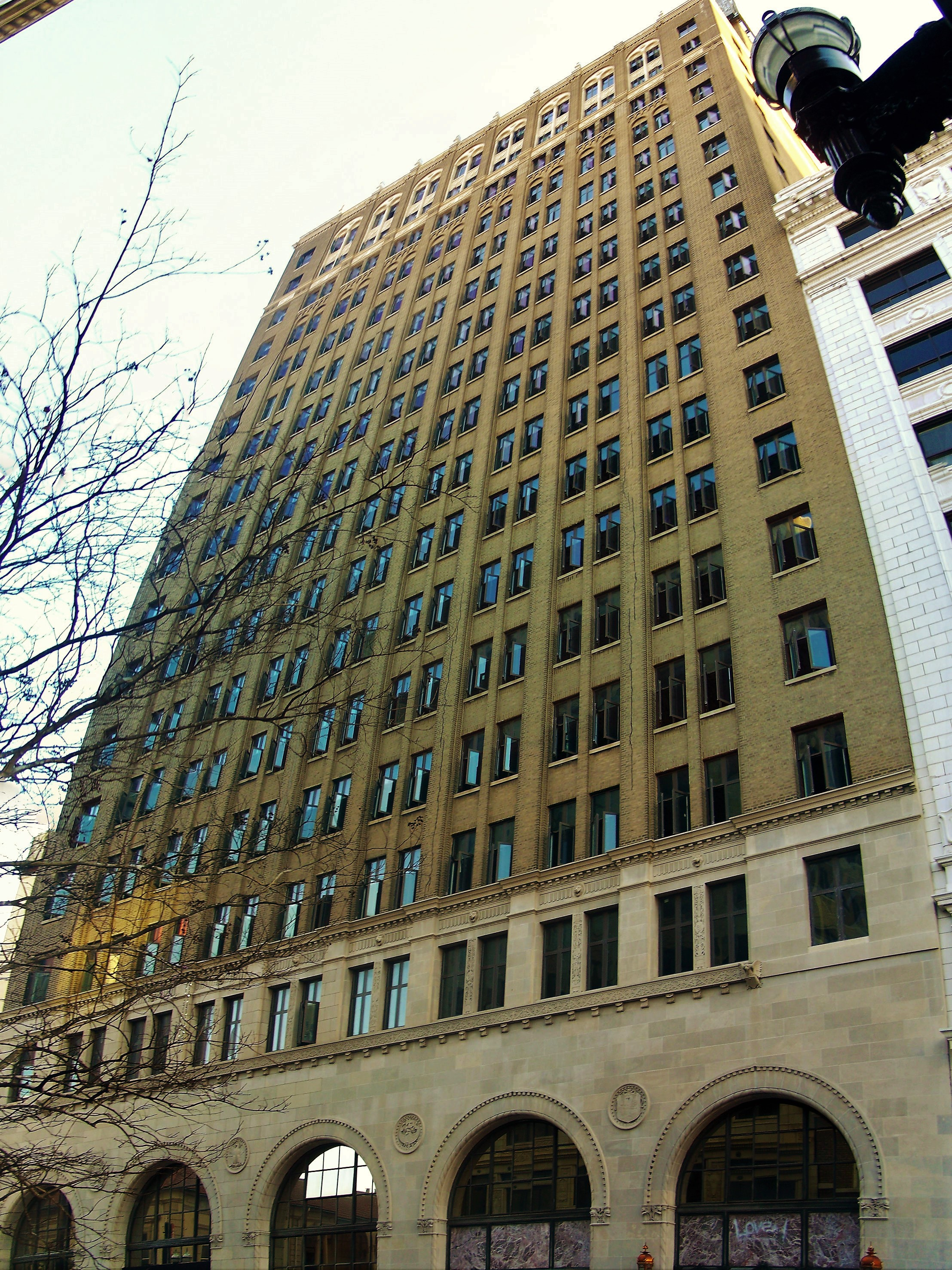
Barnett National Bank Building

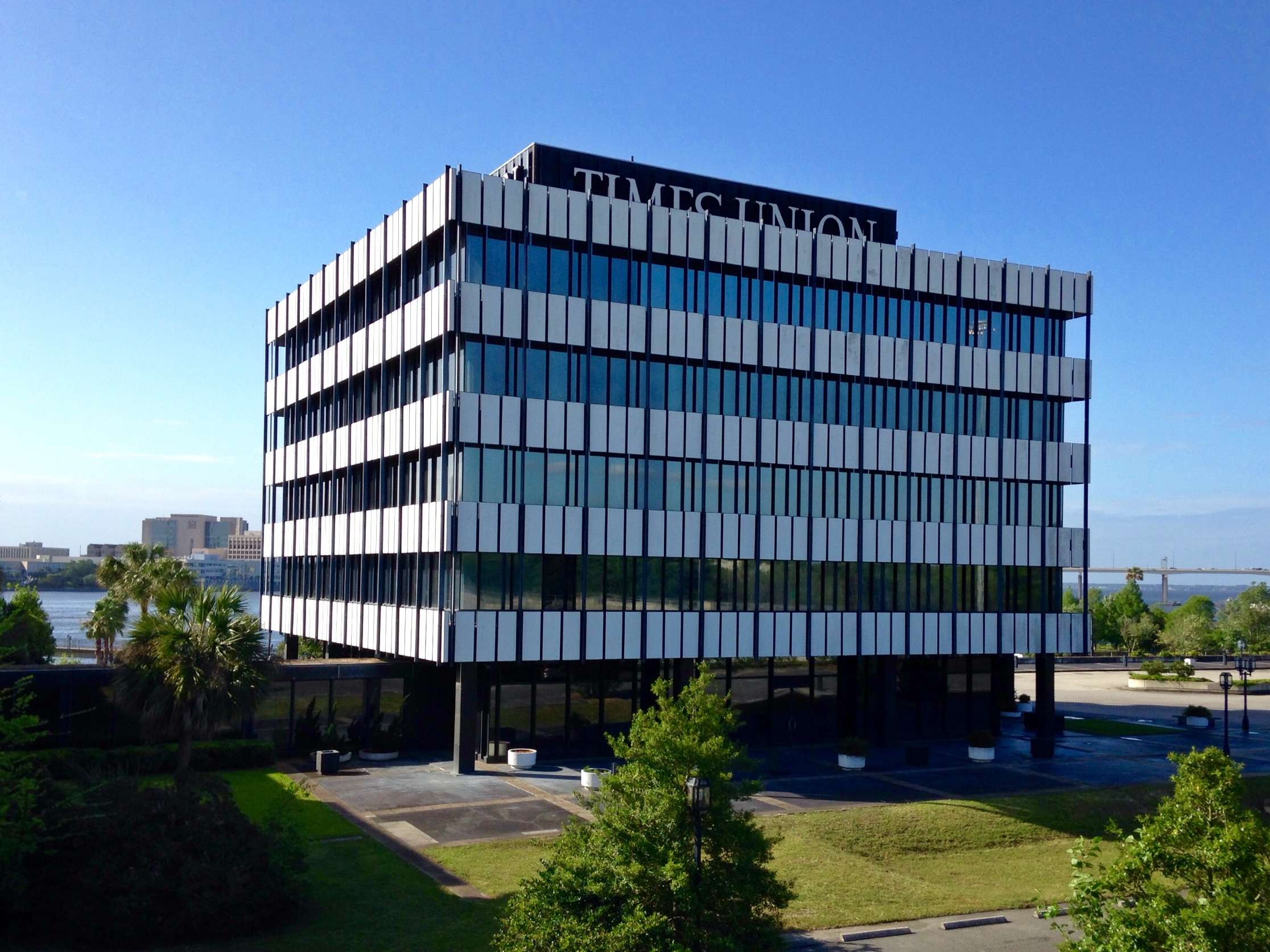
The Florida Times-Union Building

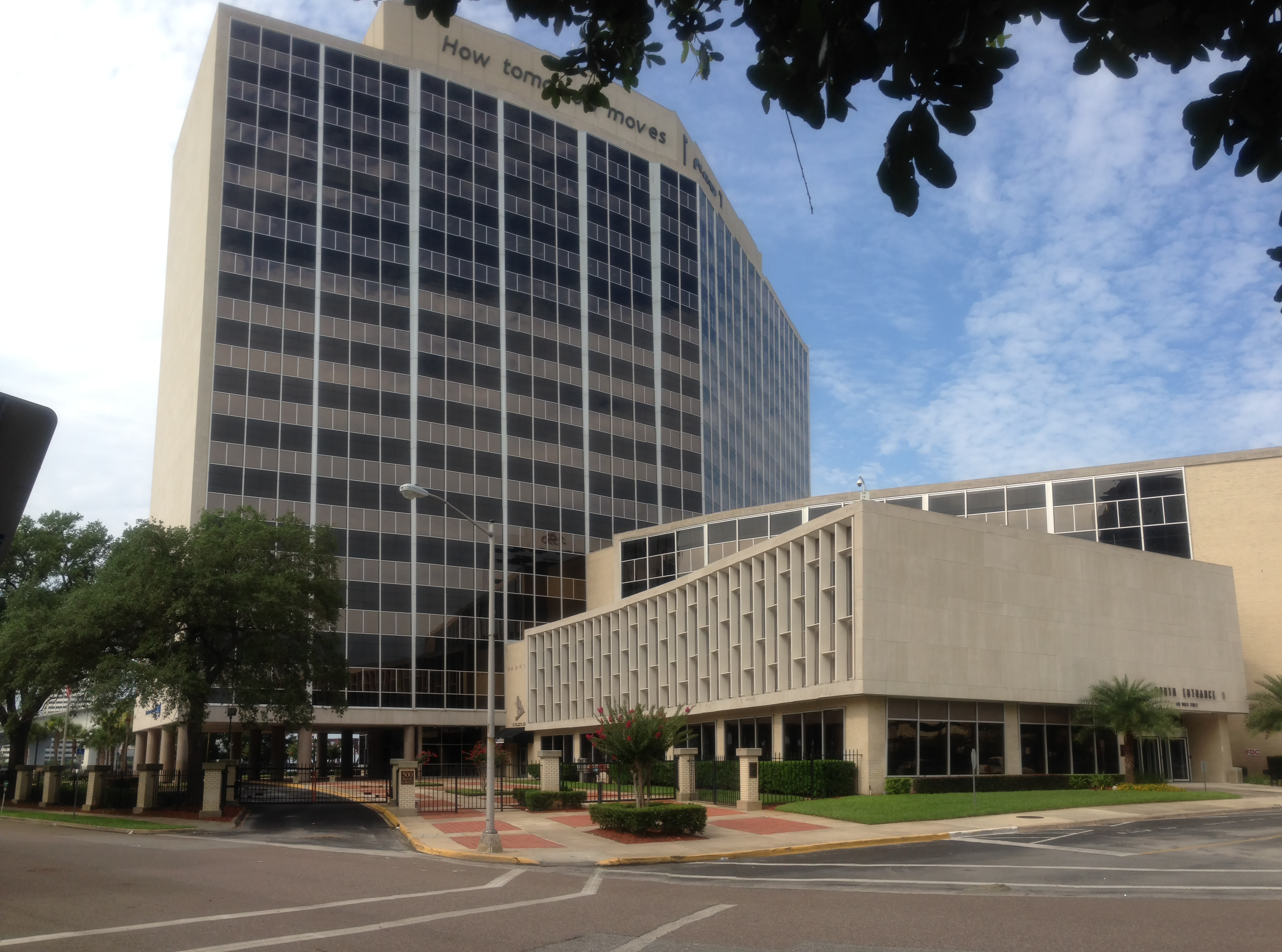
CSX Transportation Building

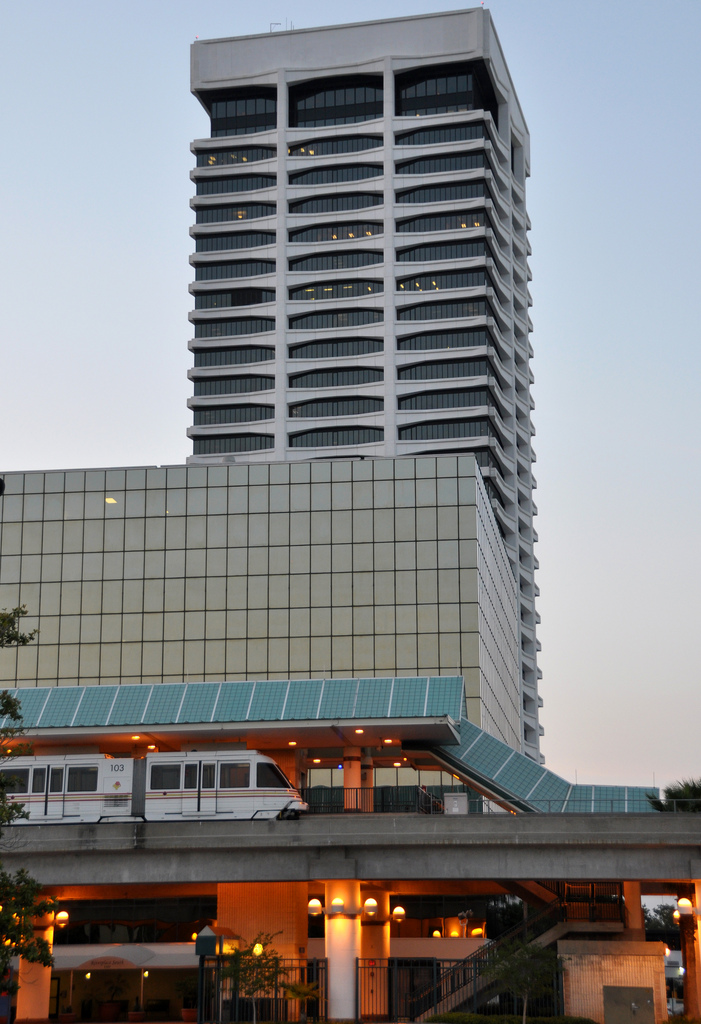
Riverplace Tower

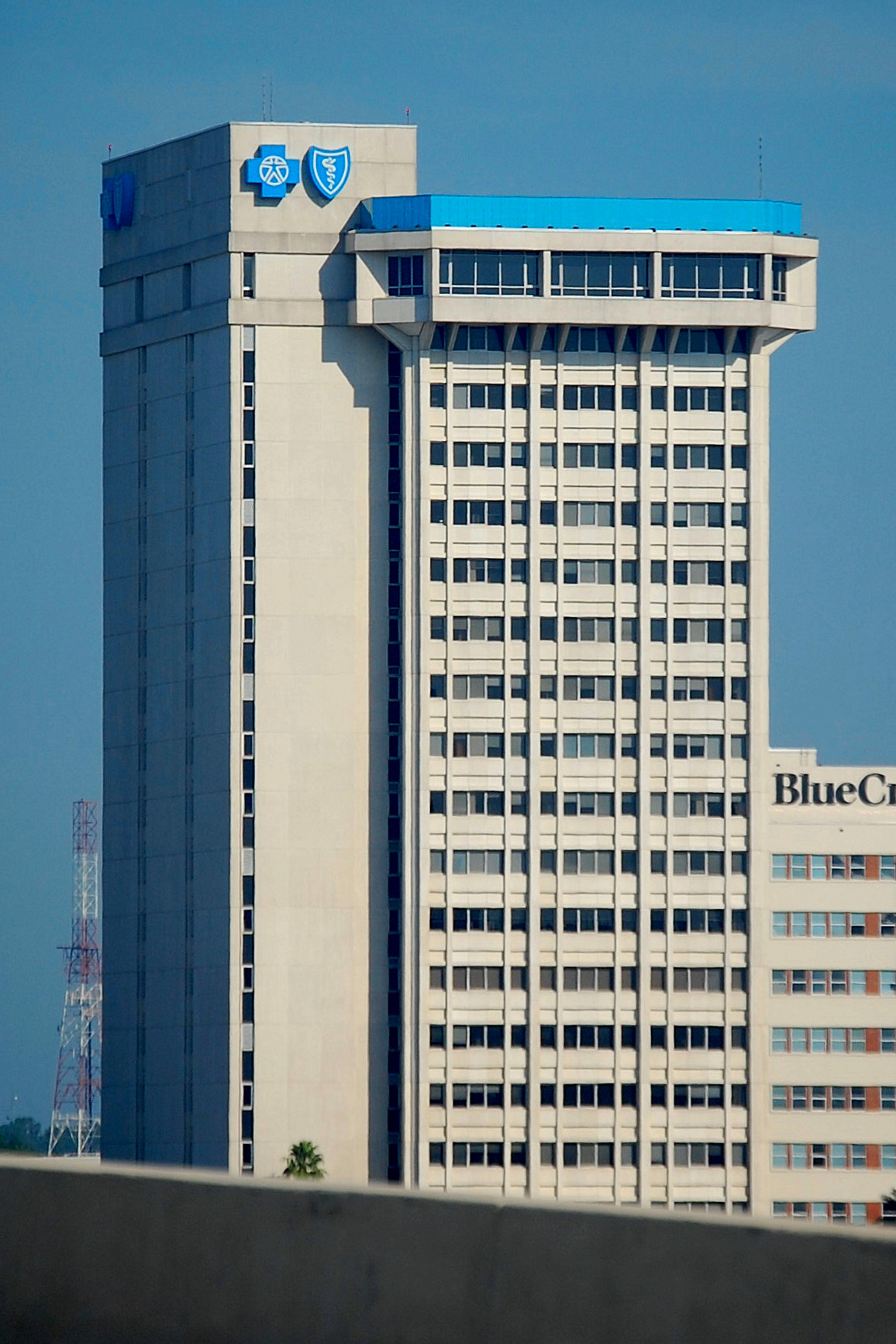
Blue Cross Blue Shield of Florida

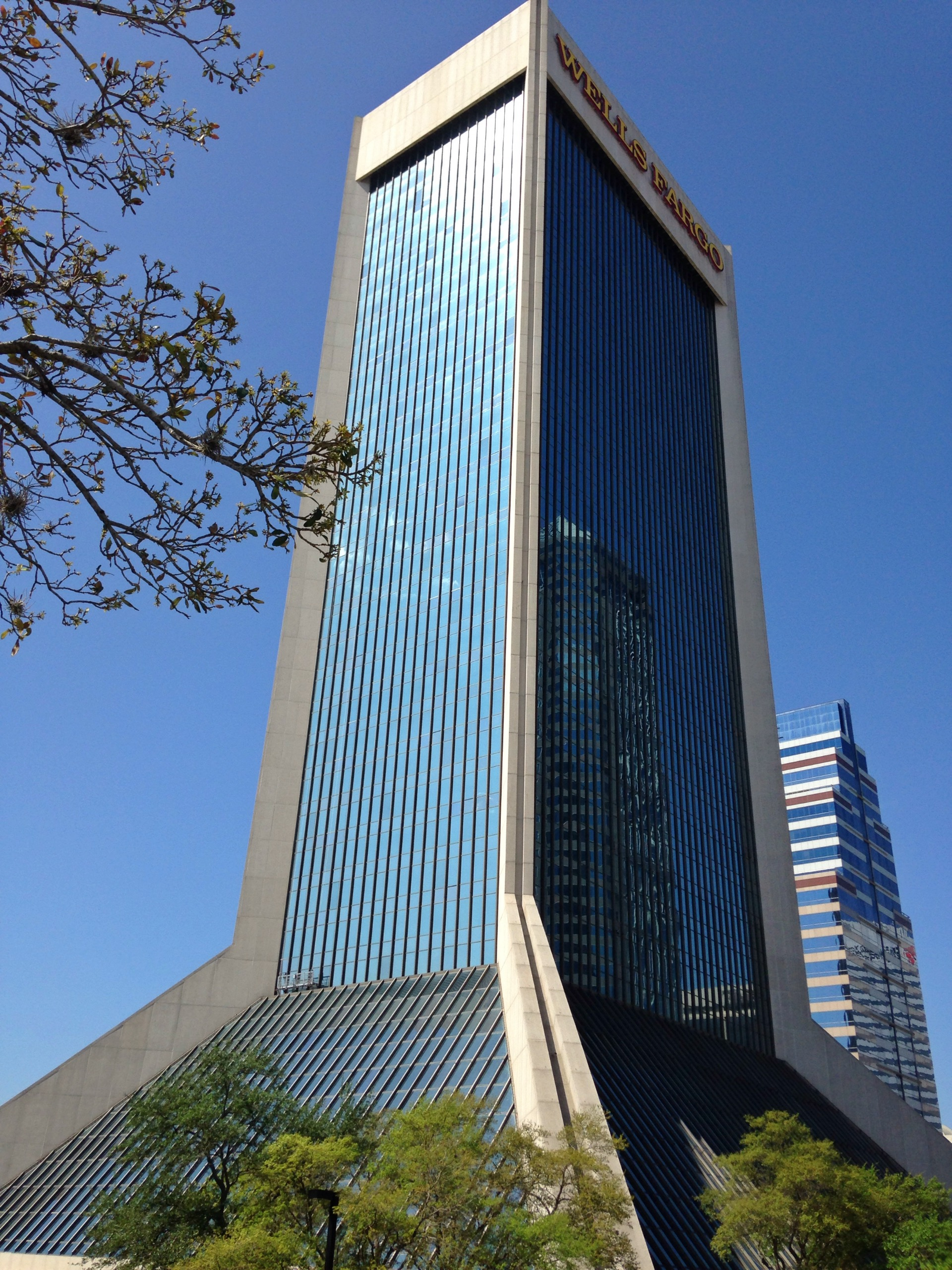
The Wells Fargo Center is one of the city's most iconic buildings

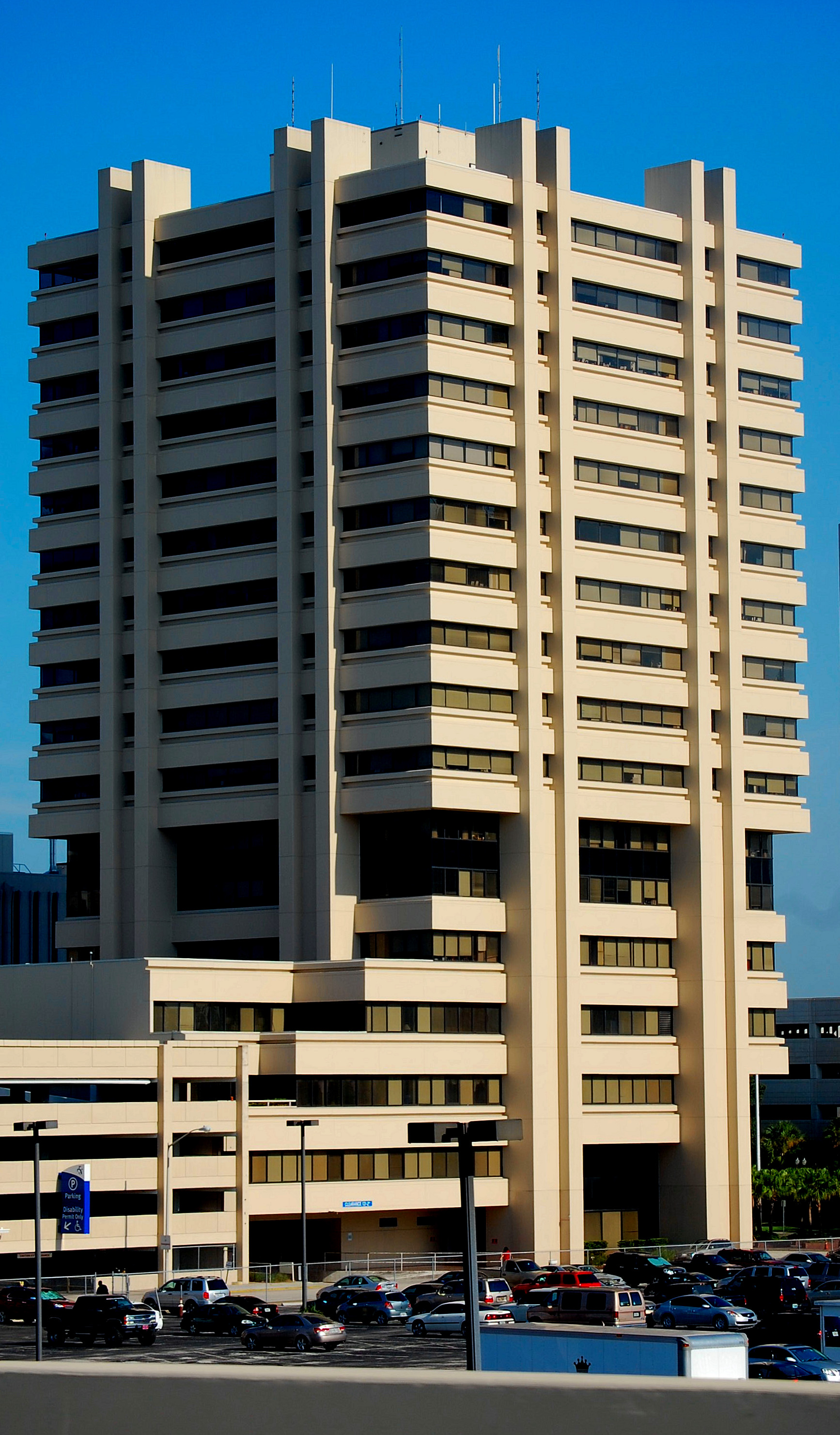
Baptist Medical Pavilion

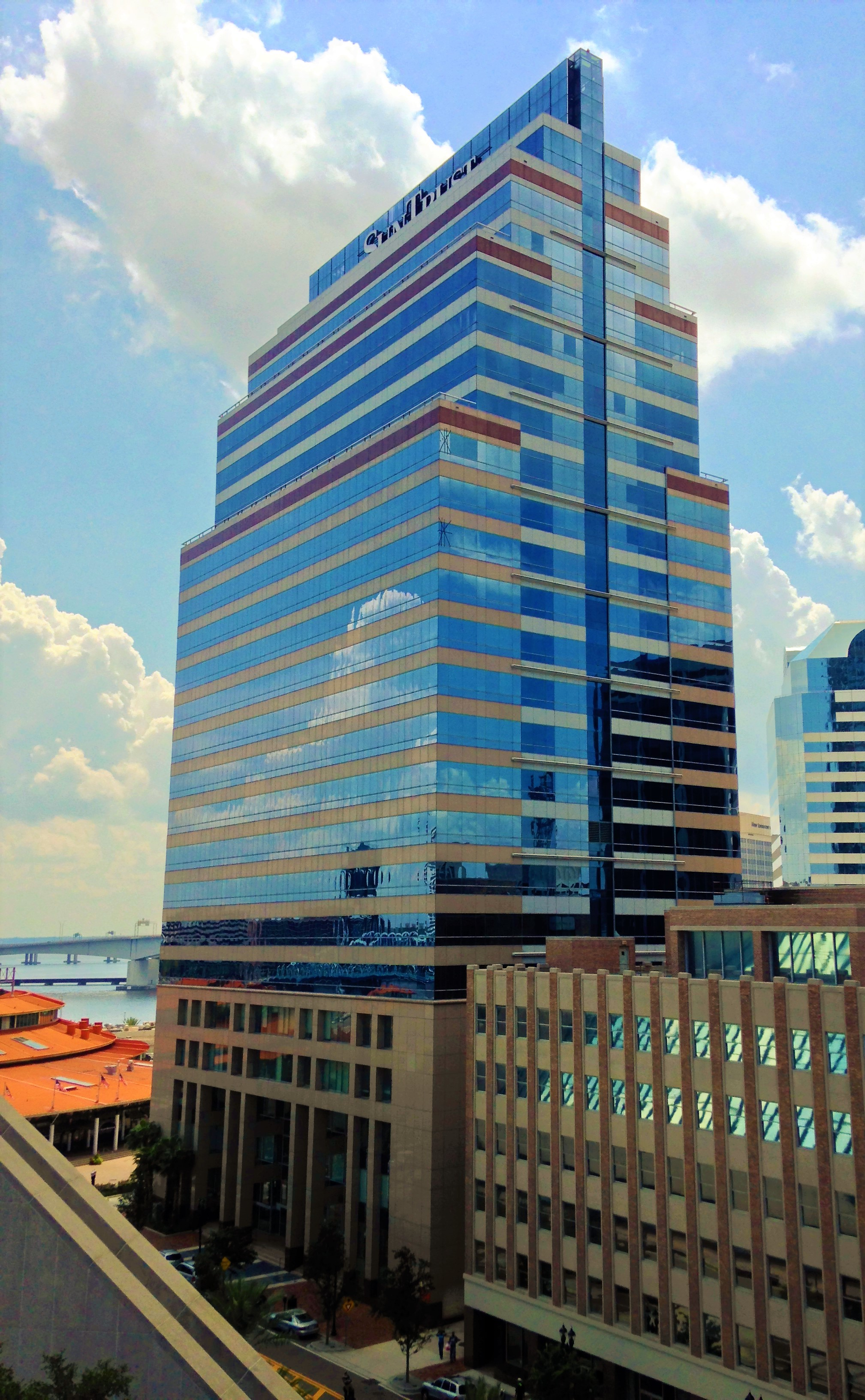
The SunTrust Tower located on Laura Street in downtown

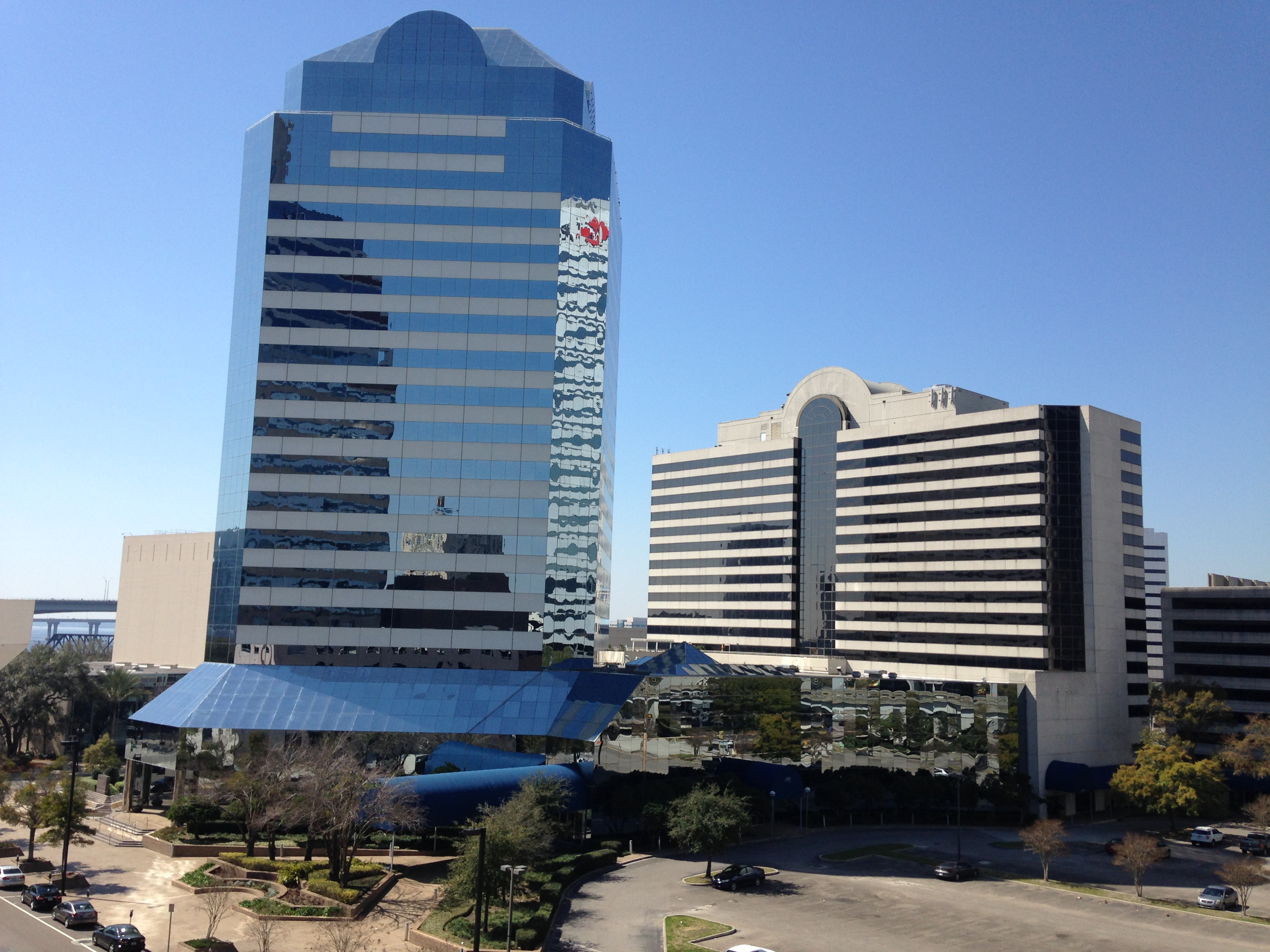
One Enterprise Center and Omni Hotel Jacksonville

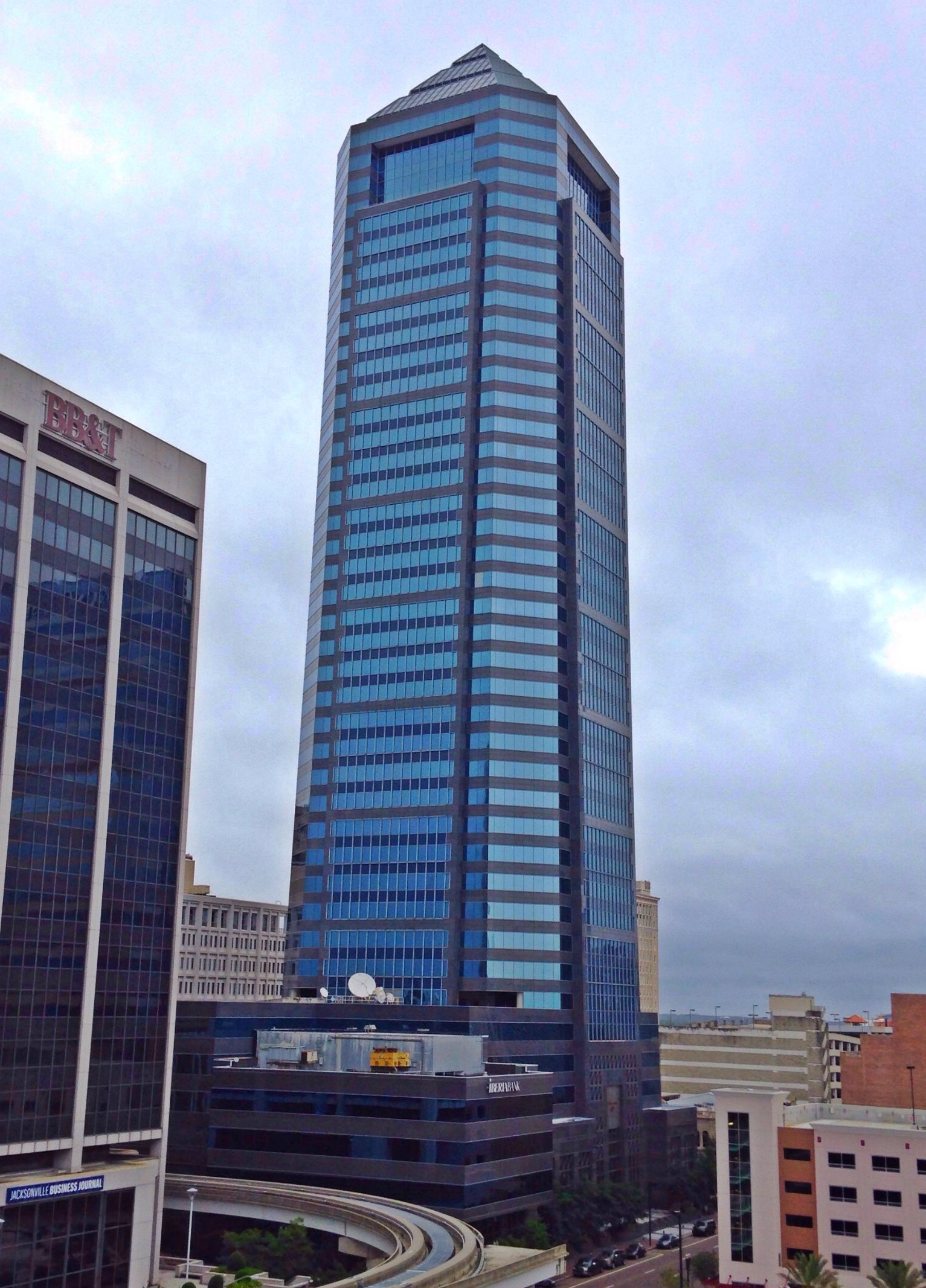
The Bank of America Tower

=== Hotels ===
- 1869 St. James Hotel (destroyed in 1901)
- 1875 Windsor Hotel (destroyed in 1901)
- 1908 Seminole Hotel, Chicago school/Prairie School, Henry John Klutho (demolished in 1974)
- 1926 Hotel George Washington, Renaissance Revival, Marsh & Saxelbye (demolished in 1973)
- 1928 Ribault Inn Club, Colonial Revival, Maurice Fatio and Mellen Clark Greeley
- 1959 Hotel Robert Meyer, Mid-century modern (demolished in 1998)
- 1975 Hyatt Regency Jacksonville Riverfront Annex, Brutalist/Modernist, William Morgan (originally the Davis State Building)
- 1987 Omni Jacksonville Hotel
- 2001 Hyatt Regency Jacksonville Riverfront

=== Shopping centers ===
- 1959 Gateway Town Center
- 1967 Regency Square Mall
- 1987 Jacksonville Landing, Postmodern. Ben Thompson (demolished in 2020)
- 1990 The Avenues
- 2005 St. Johns Town Center
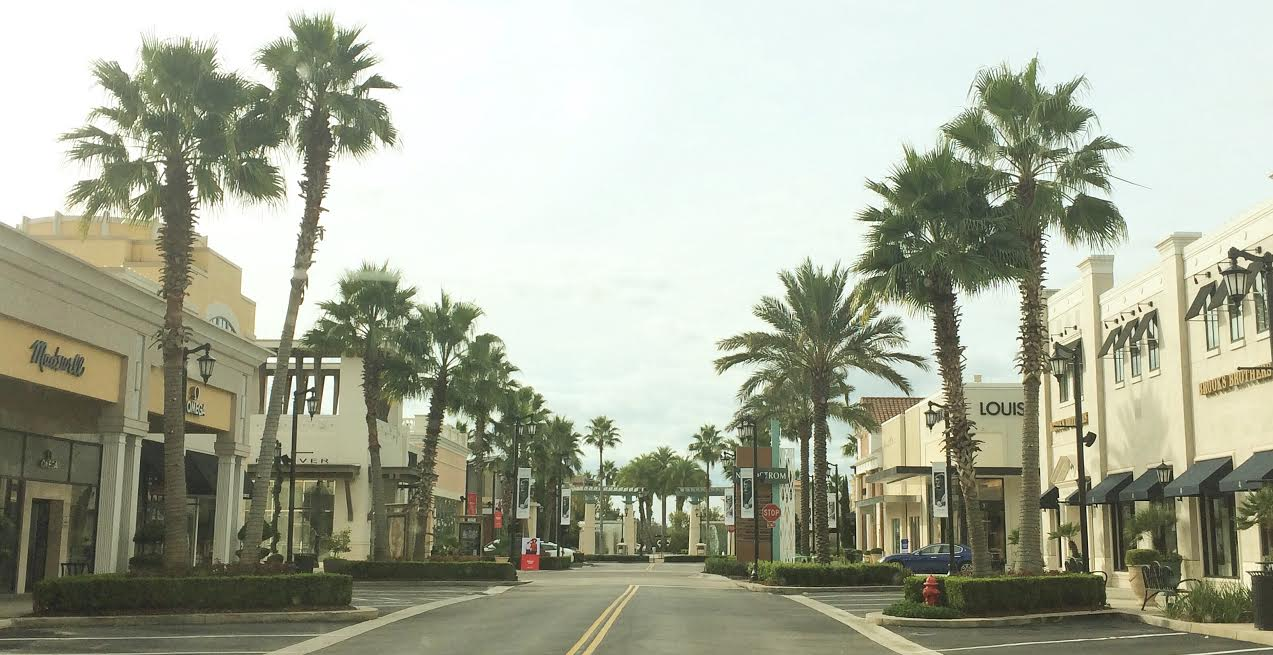
St. Johns Town Center

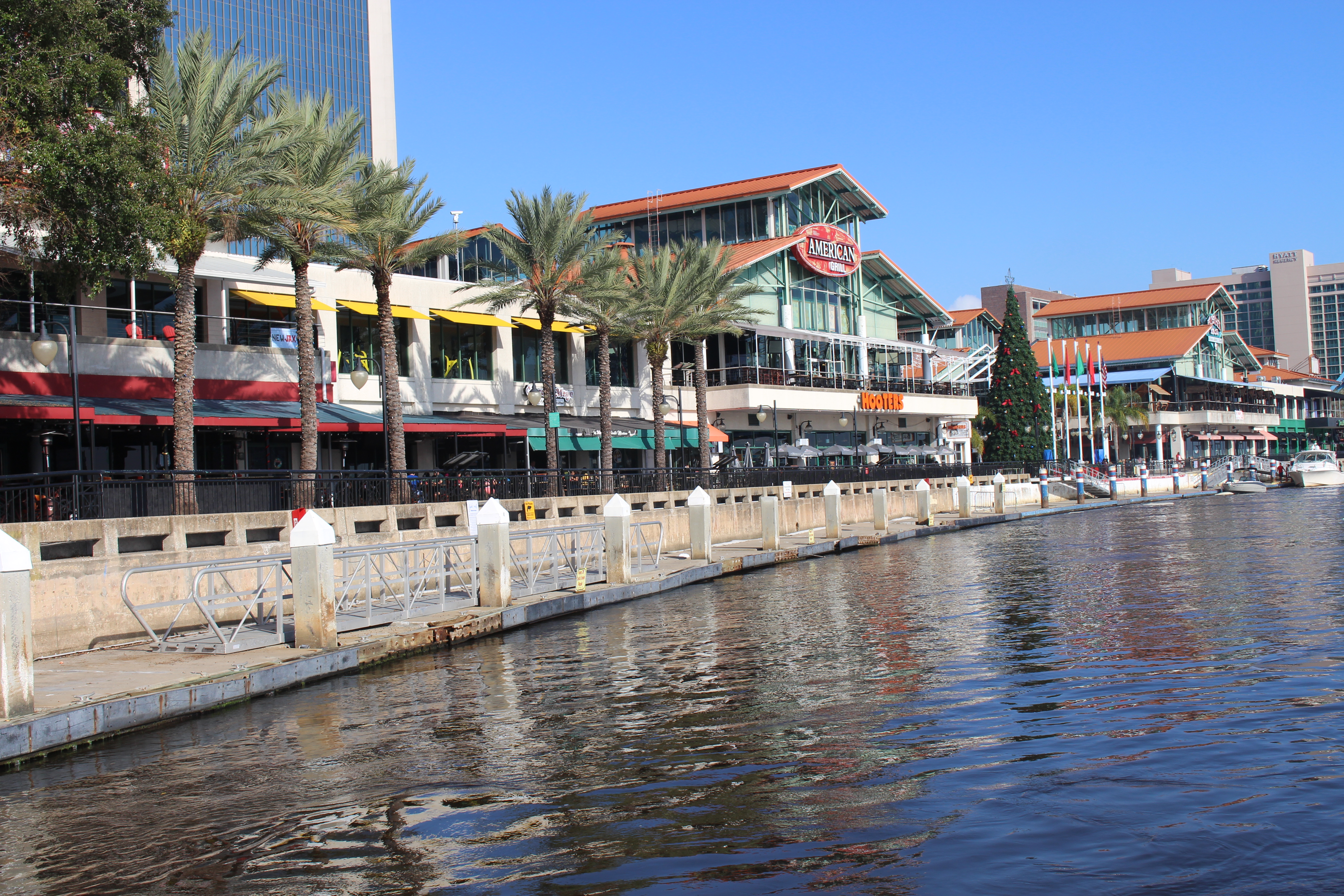
Jacksonville Landing

== Institutional architecture ==
=== Government ===
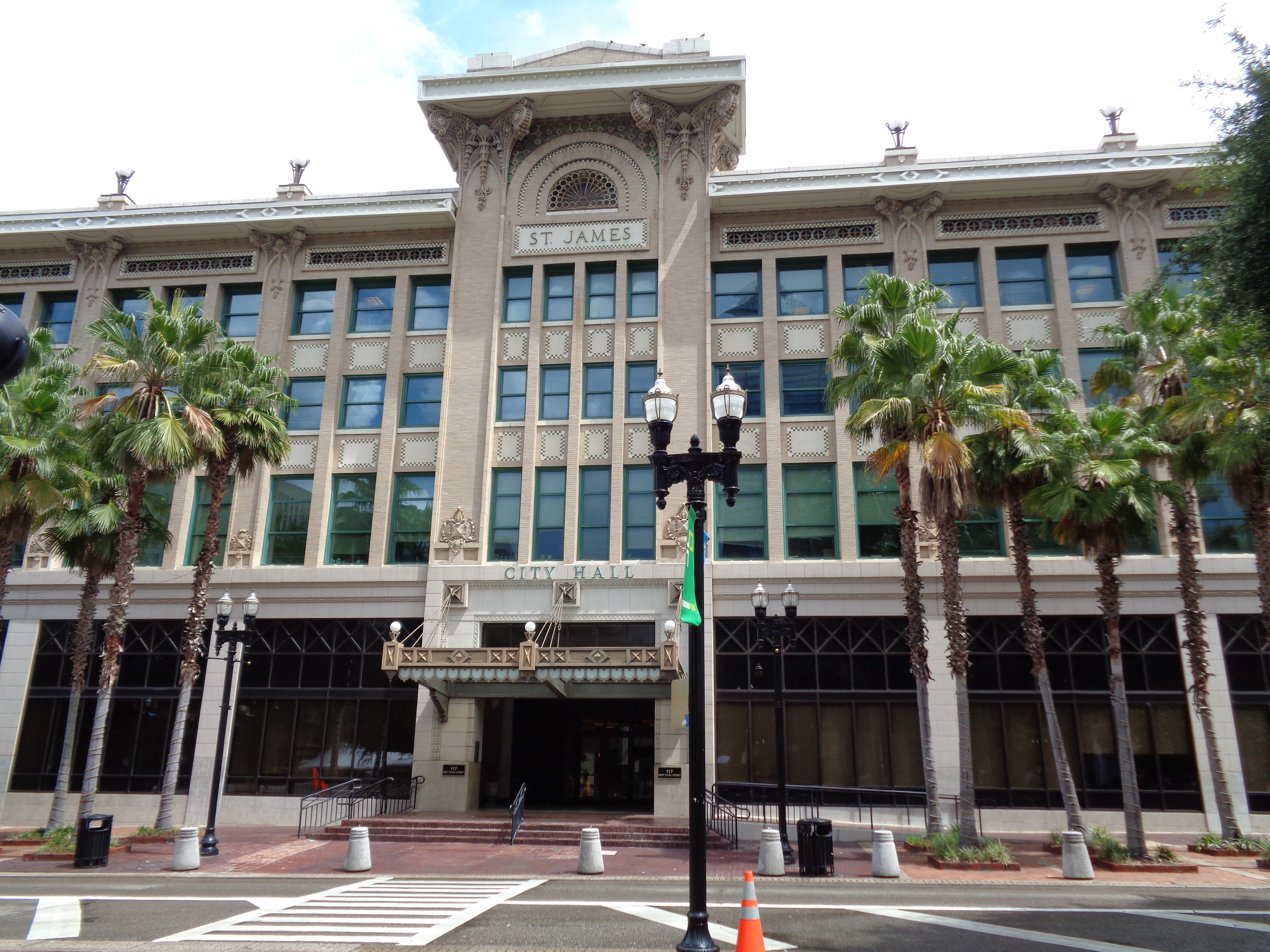
Originally a department store, the St. James Building is the current of Jacksonville City Hall, and is a prime example of local Prairie School design.

- 1886 County Courthouse (destroyed in 1901)
- 1902 County Courthouse, Classical Revival, Rutledge Holmes (demolished)
- 1909 Godbold Building, Chicago school/Prairie School, Henry John Klutho (Originally the YMCA Building)
- 1912 St. James Building, Chicago school/Prairie School, Henry John Klutho
- 1913 The Criminal Court Building, Prairie School, Henry John Klutho (demolished in 1968)
- 1924 Federal Reserve Bank of Atlanta Jacksonville Branch, Georgian Revival, Henrietta Cuttino Dozier and A. Ten Eyck Brown
- 1933 Ed Austin Building, PWA Moderne/Stripped Classicism, Marsh & Saxelbye (originally the United States Federal Courthouse)
- 1952 Fire and Rescue Headquarters Building, Art Deco/Modernist, (originally the Federal Reserve Bank of Atlanta Jacksonville Branch)
- 1958 Old Duval County Courthouse, International Style, Reynolds, Smith & Hills
- 1960 City Hall Annex, Mid-century modern, Reynolds, Smith & Hills (Former City Hall)
- 1961 Edward Ball Building, International Style (originally the Florida National Bank Building)
- 1966 Charles E. Bennett Federal Building, Brutalist/Mid-century modern, Reynolds, Smith & Hills
- 1977 Jacksonville Sheriff's Office Headquarters, Brutalist/Modernist, William Morgan
- 2002 Bryan Simpson United States Courthouse, Postmodern, Kemp, Bunch & Jackson
- 2012 Duval County Courthouse, Kemp, Bunch & Jackson
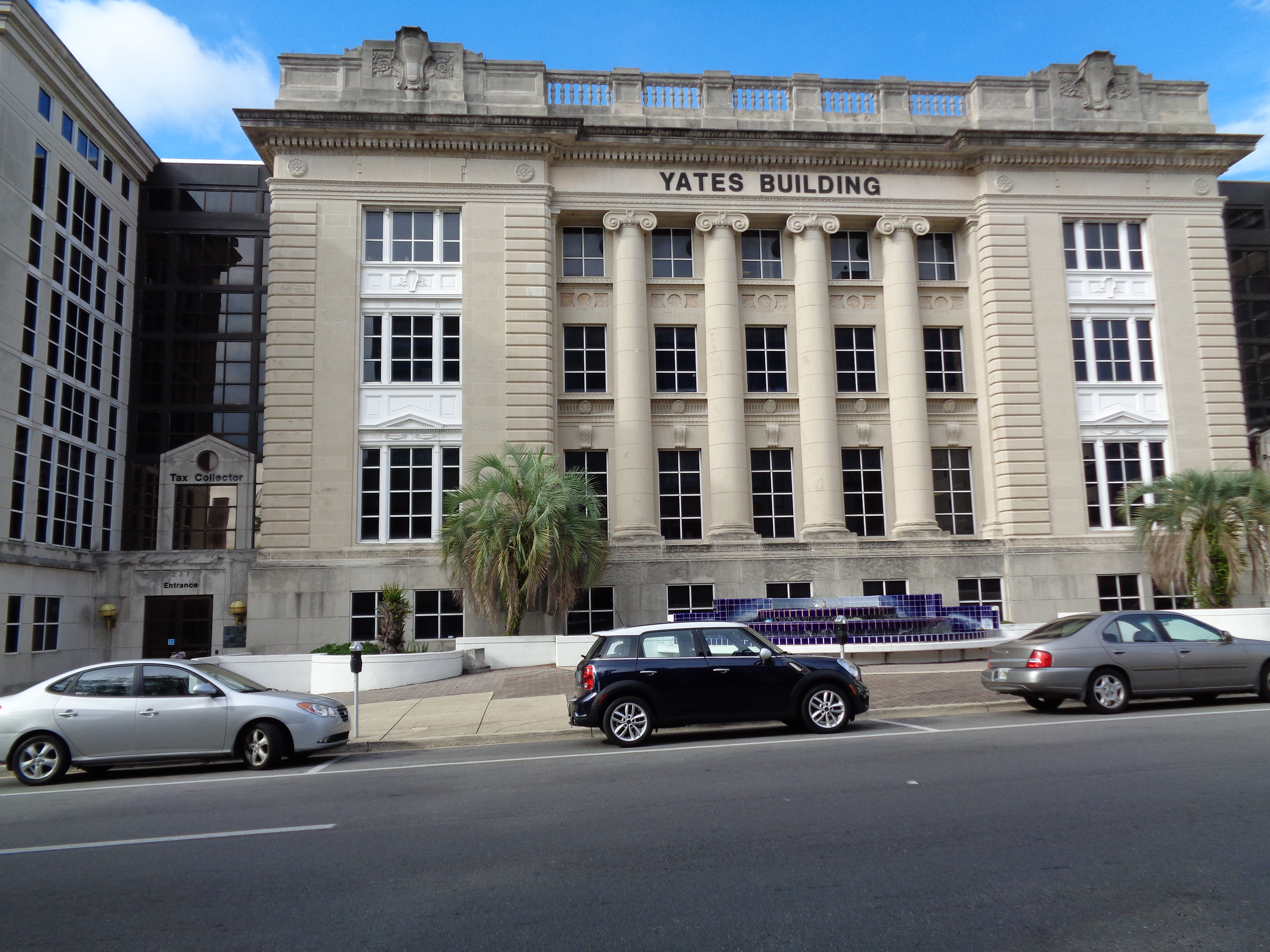
Yates Building

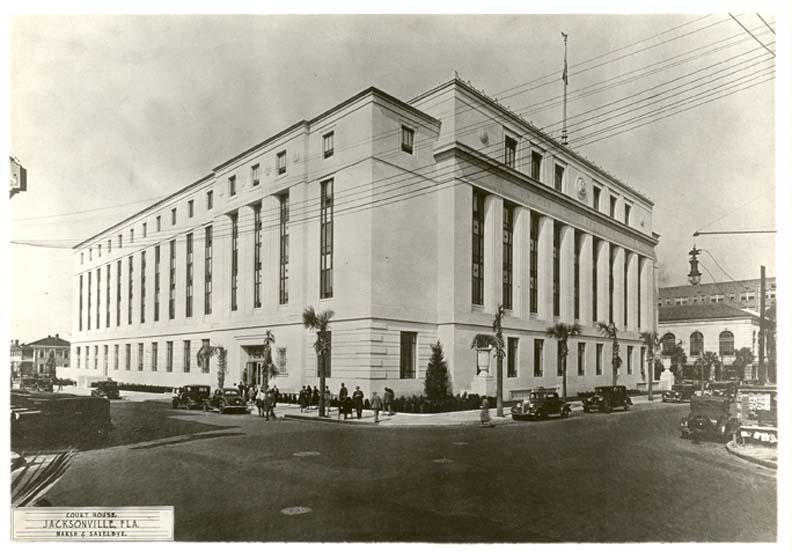
Ed Austin Building

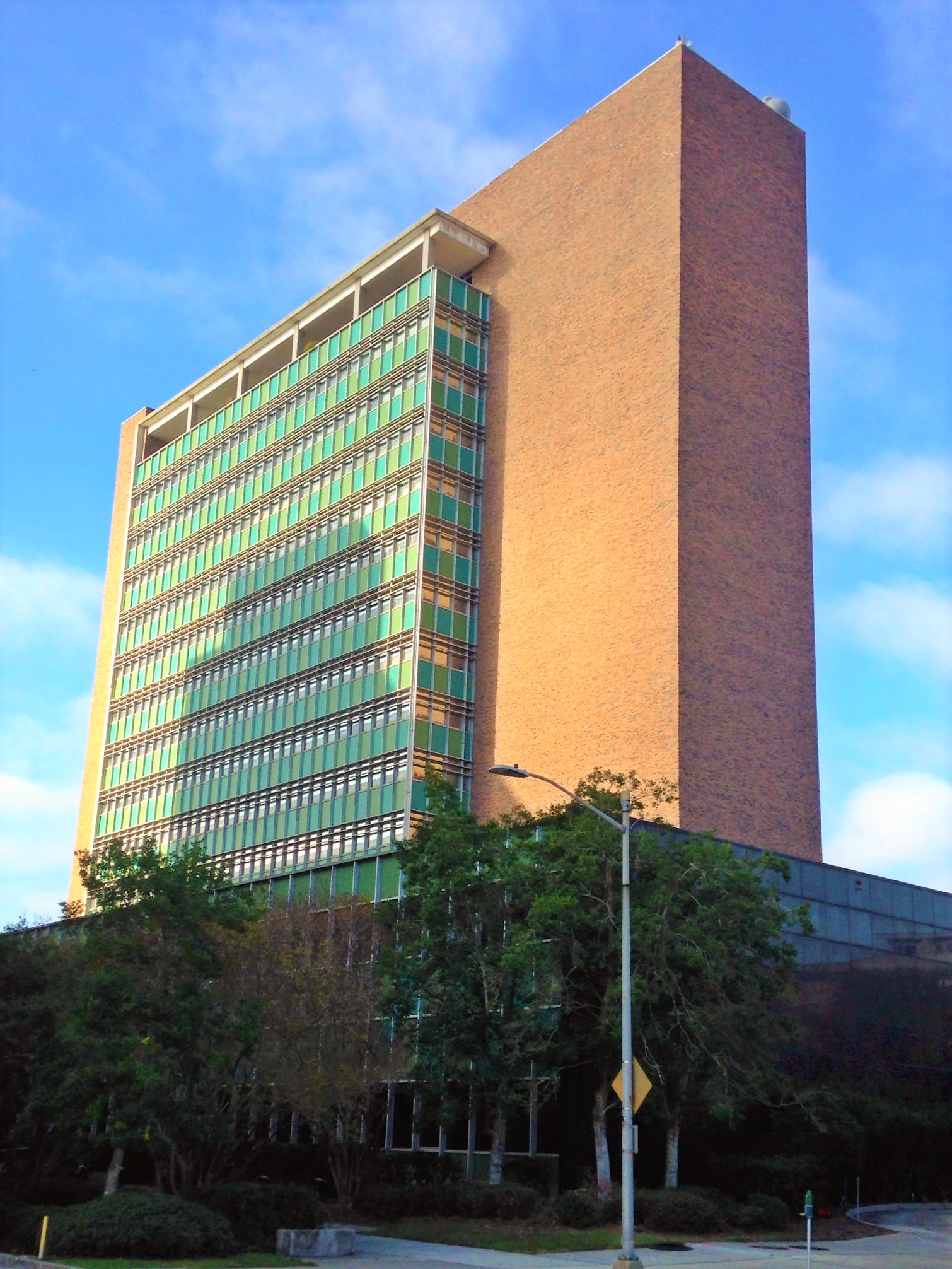
City Hall Annex

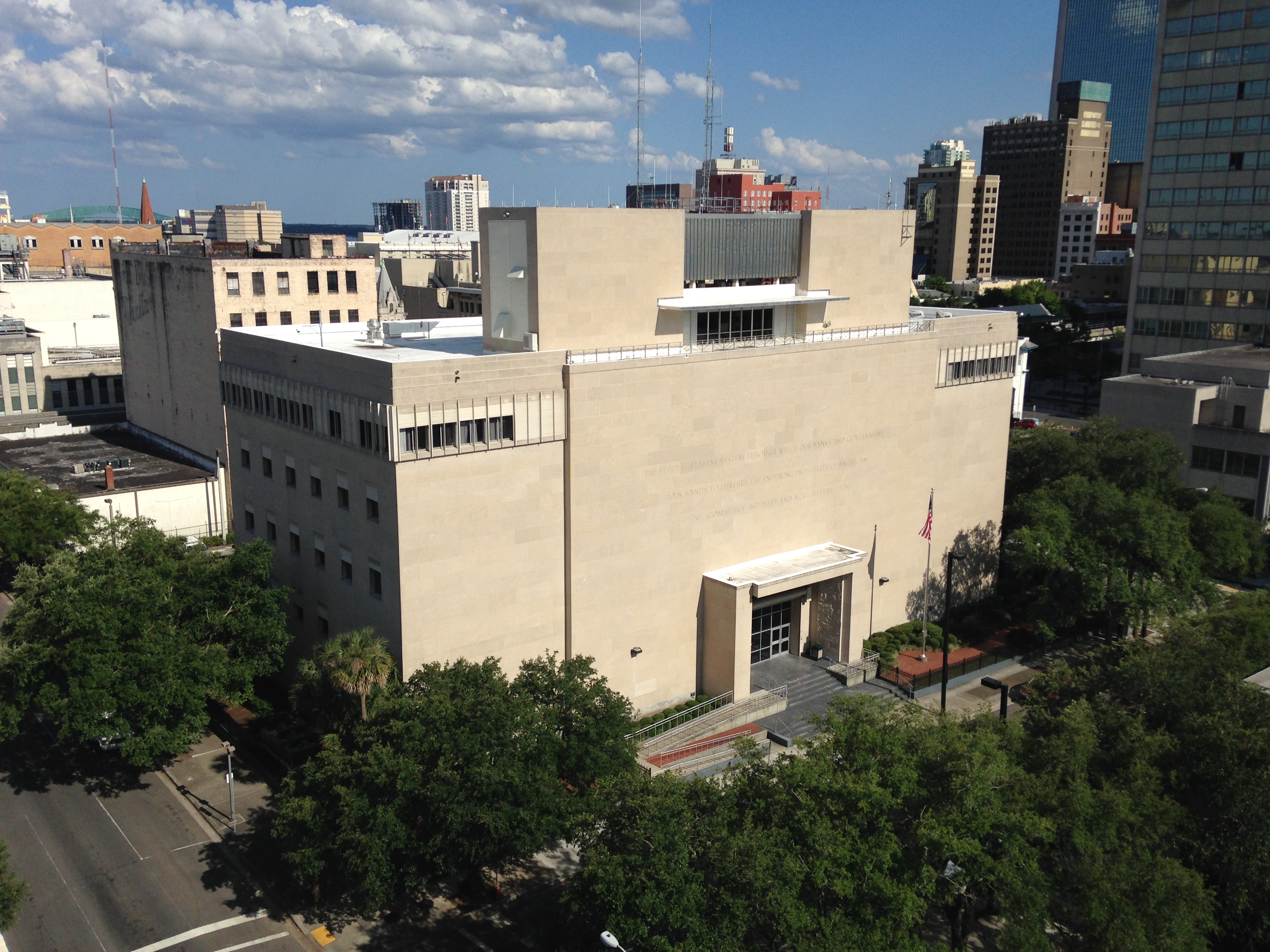
Jacksonville Fire and Rescue Department Headquarters (Former Federal Reserve Bank of Atlanta Jacksonville Branch)

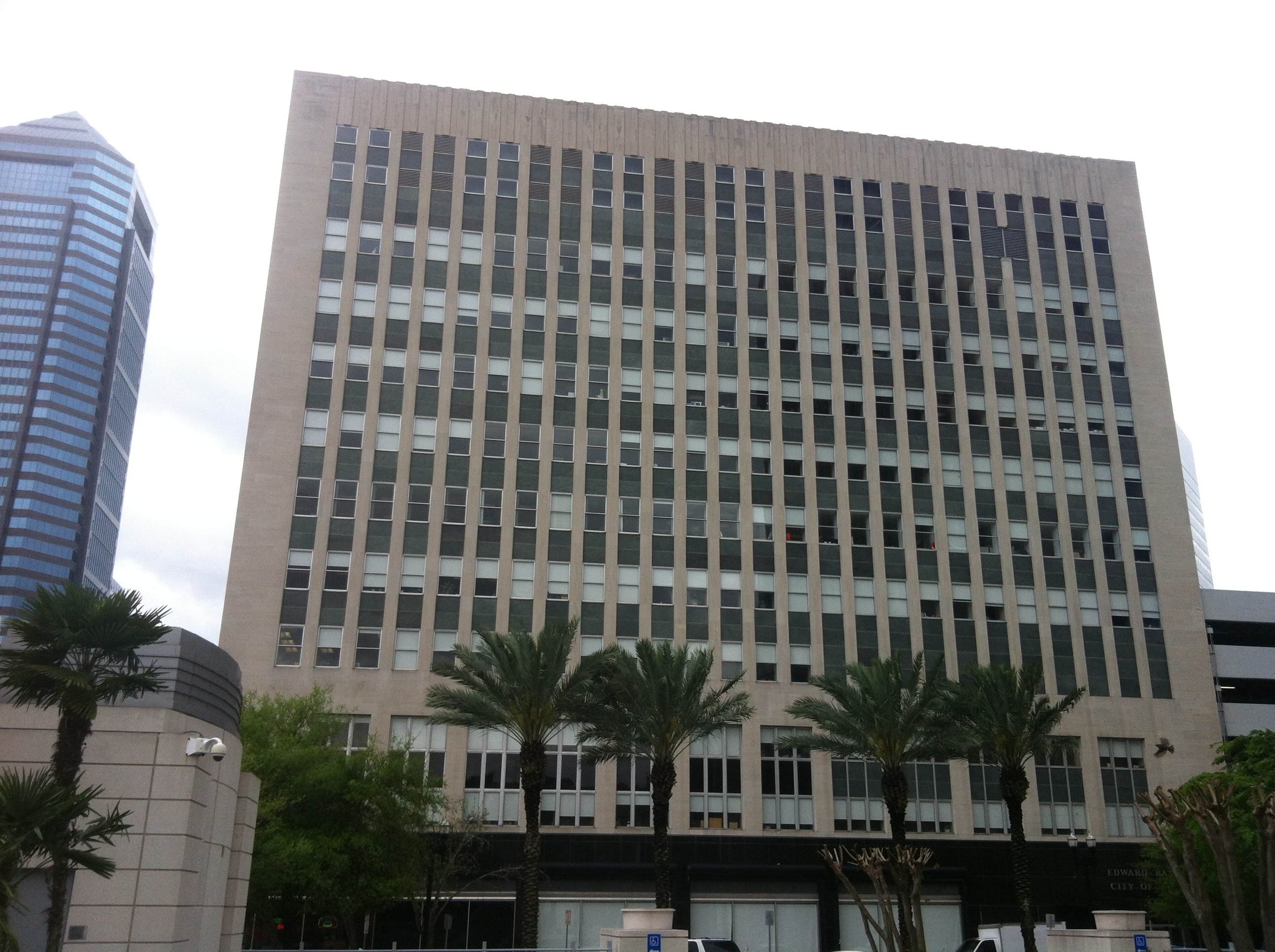
The Ed Ball Building

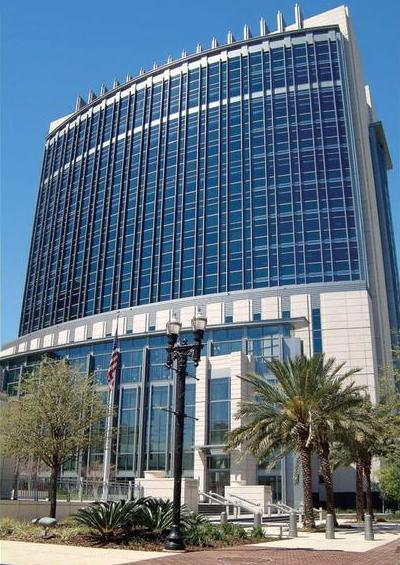
United States Courthouse

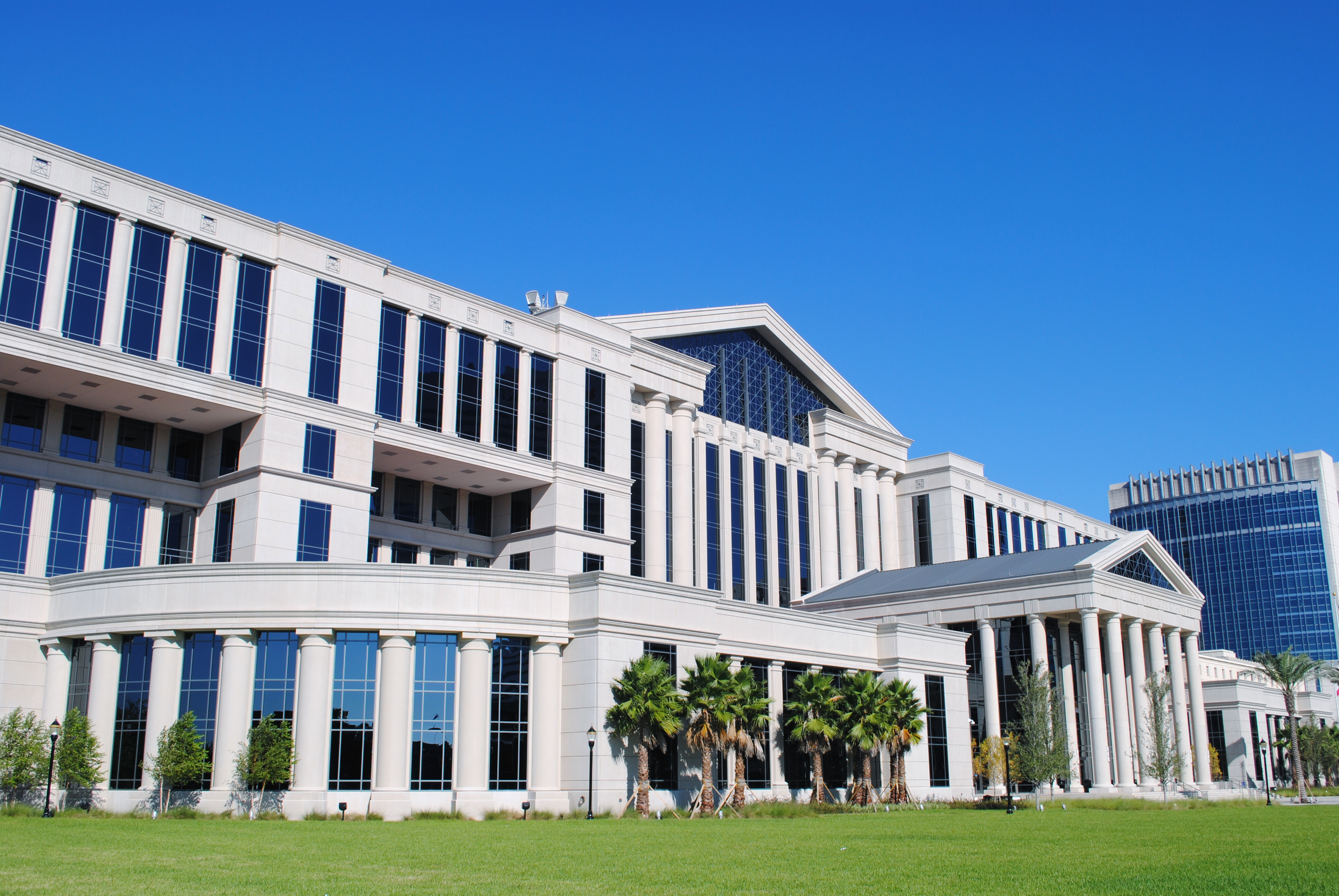
Duval County Courthouse

=== Education ===
- 1905 Carnegie Library, Classical Revival, Henry John Klutho
- 1916 Centennial Hall, Georgian Revival, Howells & Stokes
- 1925 Bolles School, Mediterranean Revival, Marsh & Saxelbye
- 1974 J. Henry Gooding Building on the Jacksonville University campus, Brutalist, Kemp, Bunch & Jackson
- 2005 Main Library Building, Postmodern, Robert A. M. Stern
- 2009 University of North Florida Student Union, Green/Modernist, Rink Design
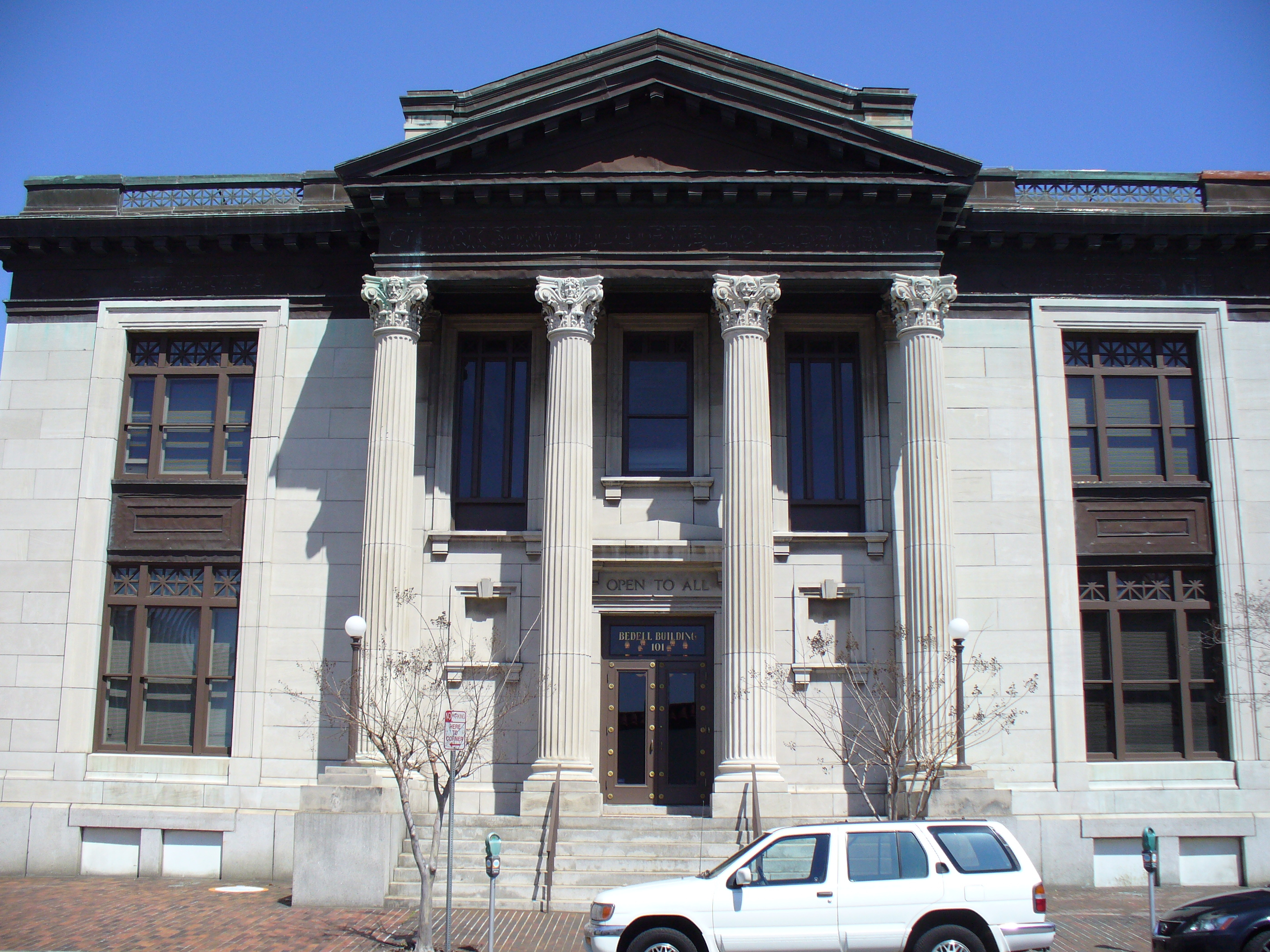
Carnegie Library

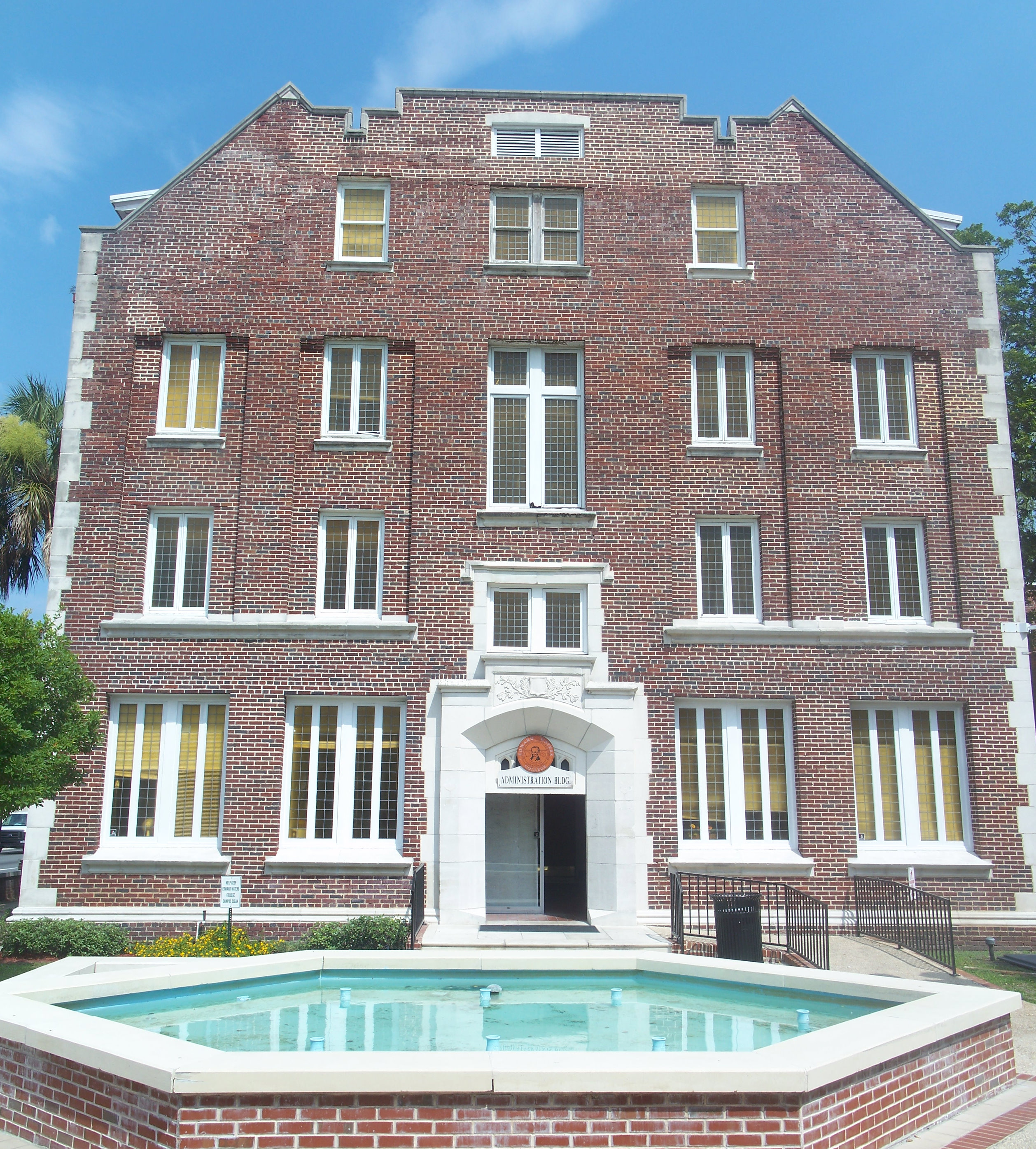
Edward Waters College

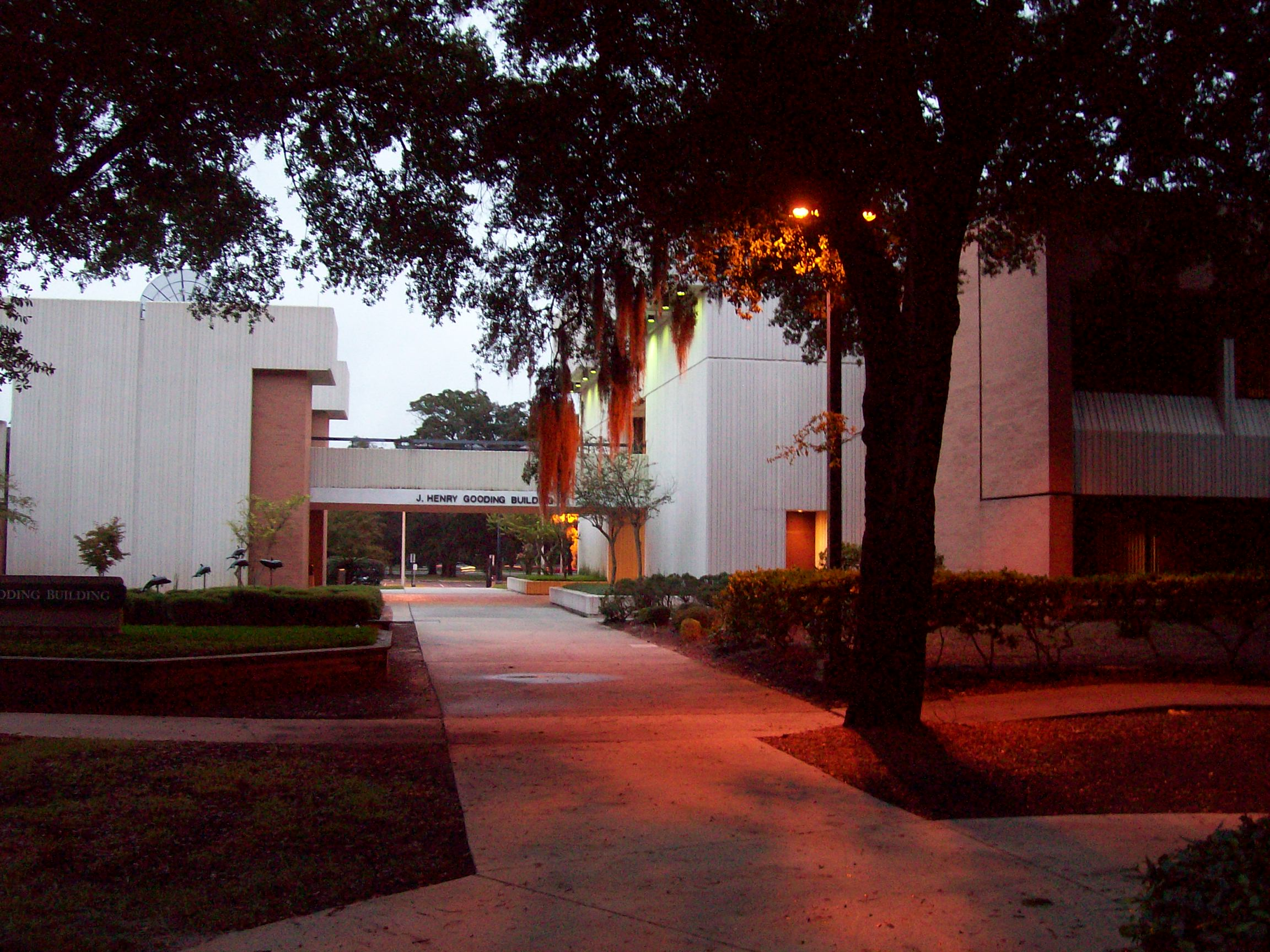
Gooding Building on the Jacksonville University Campus

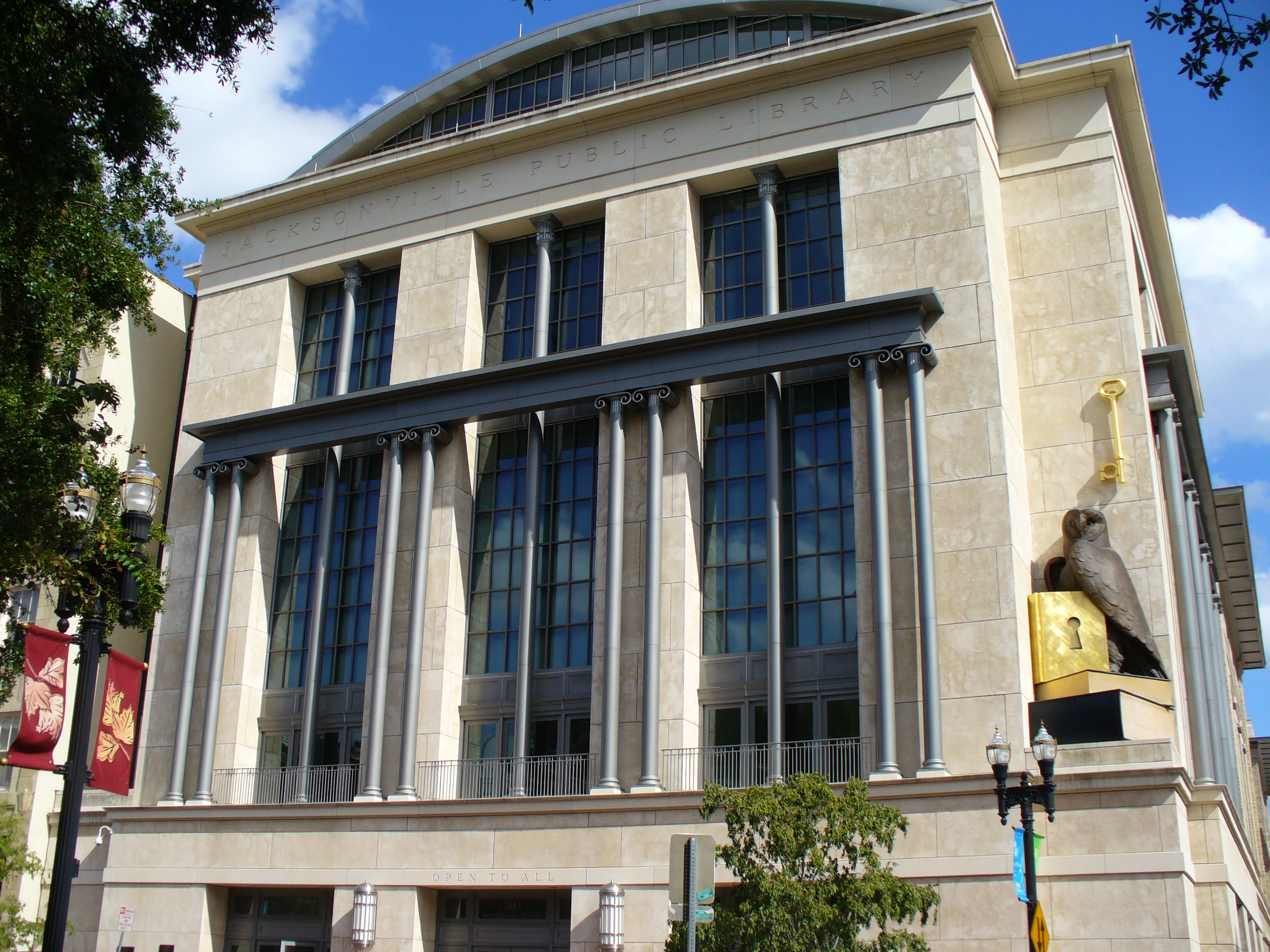
Jacksonville Public Library

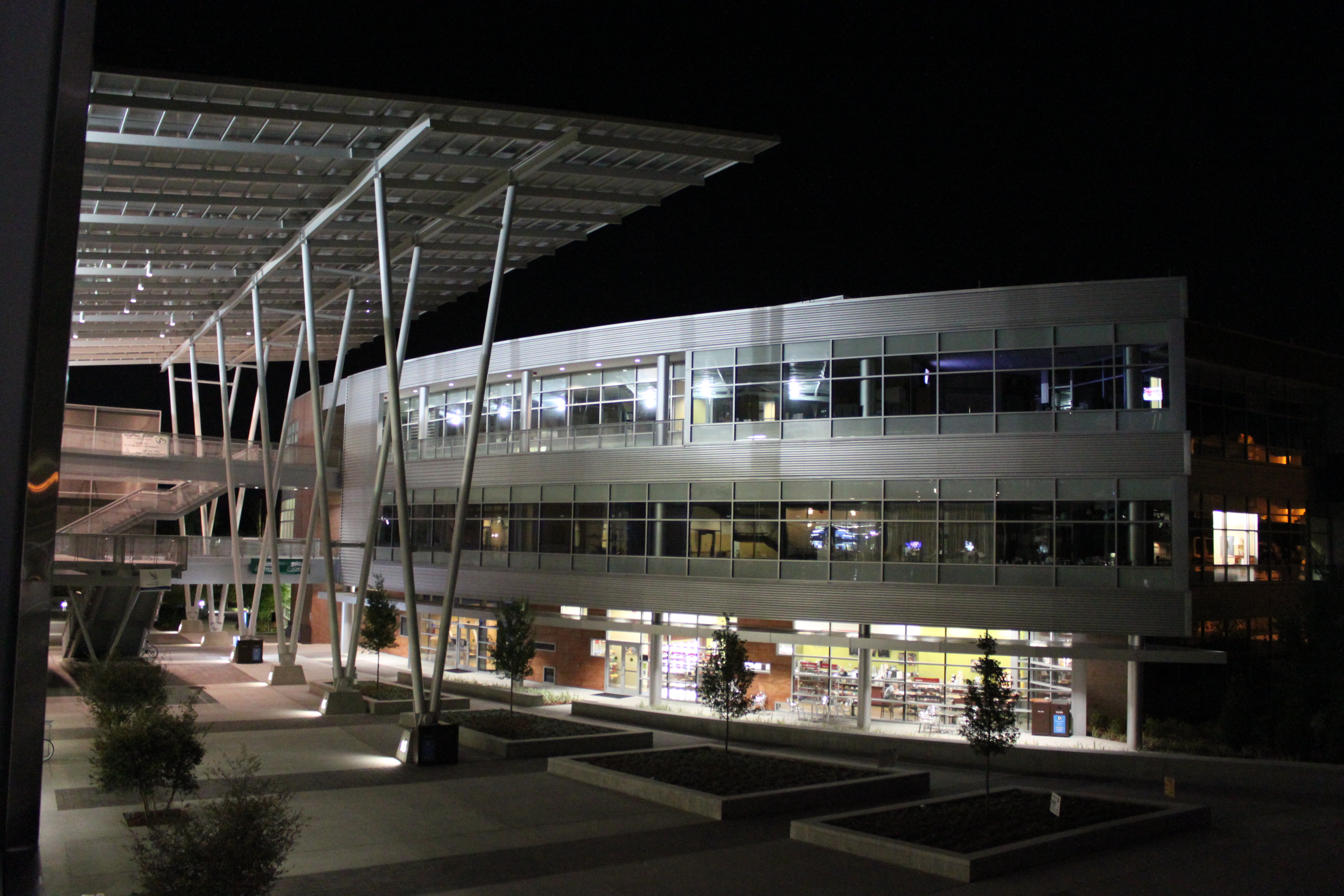
University of North Florida Student Union

=== Museums ===
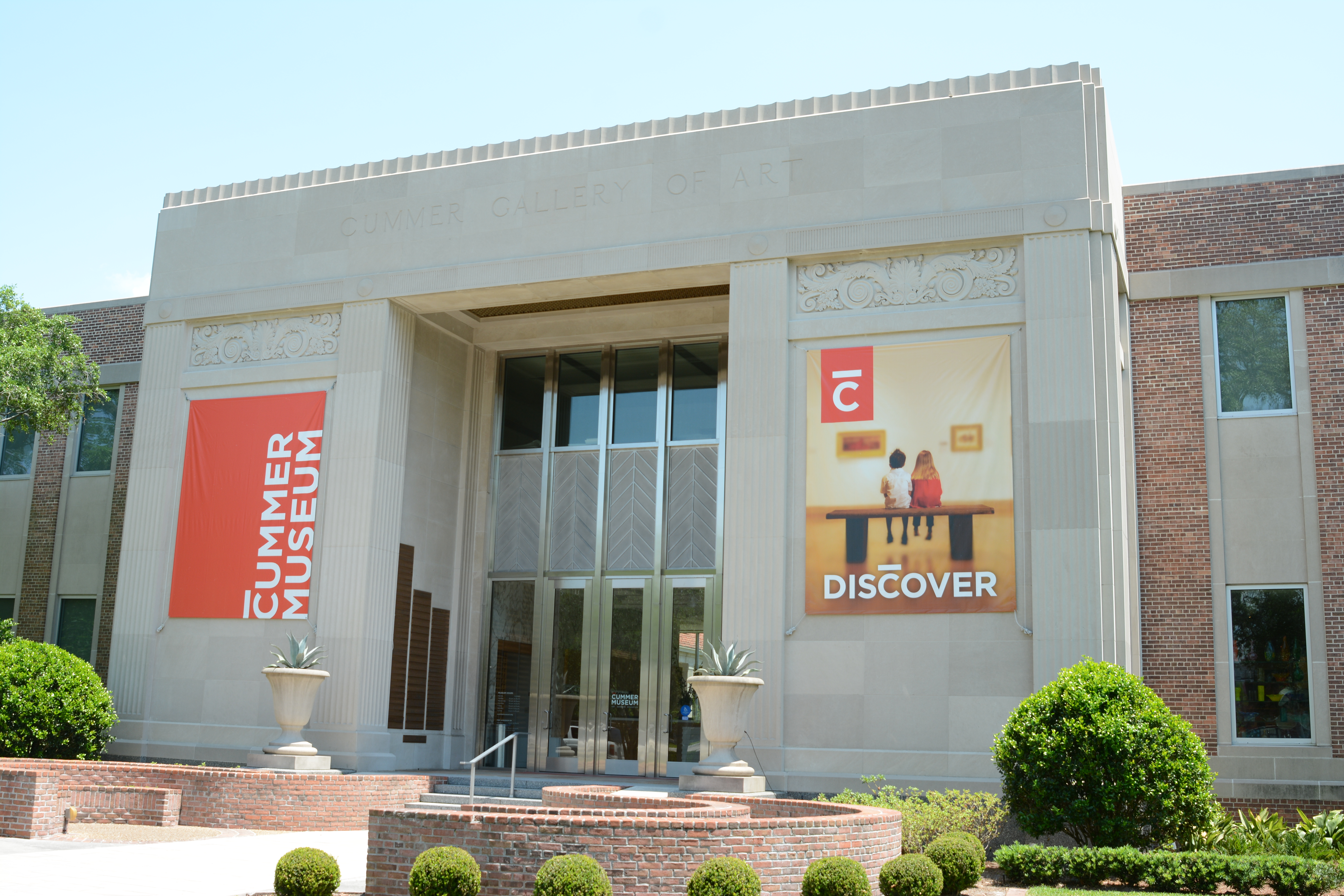
Cummer Museum of Art and Gardens (1961), designed by Saxelby & Powell

Jacksonville is home to a variety of museums of varied styles. Completed in 1921, the Karpeles Manuscript Library Museum is a Classical Revival building originally constructed for the Church of Christian Scientist. It was designed by the local architecture firm Marsh & Saxelbye. Also designed by Marsh & Saxelbye, the Museum of Contemporary Art Jacksonville was originally built in 1931 for the Western Union Telegraph Company, and stands as one of Jacksonville's best examples of Art Deco in architecture. Another example of Art Deco is the Cummer Museum of Art and Gardens. Completed in 1961, the fine arts museum was designed by Saxelby & Powell. Constructed in 1965, the Jacksonville Art Museum was predecessor of what is now the Museum of Contemporary Art Jacksonville. Designed by Taylor Hardwick, the building is located in the Midtown Centre office complex. Originally built in 1969 as the Jacksonville Children's Museum, William Morgan's Brutalist designed museum currently houses the Museum of Science and History.

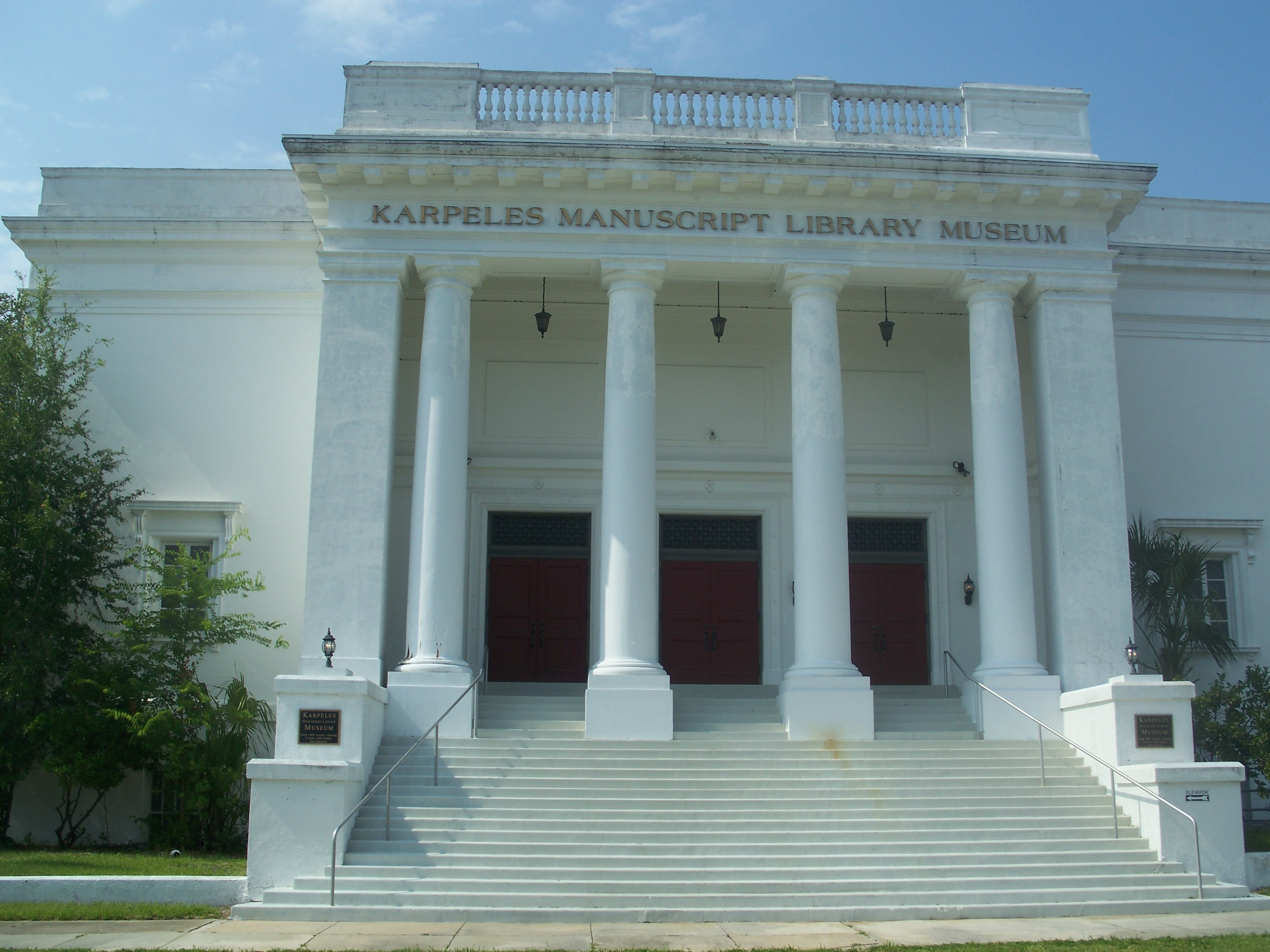
Karpeles Manuscript Library Museum

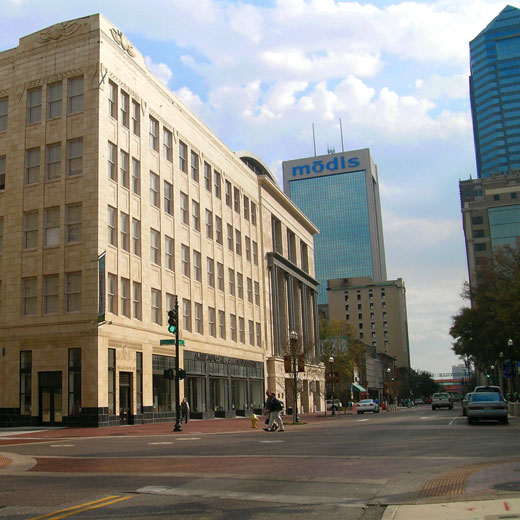
Museum of Contemporary Art Jacksonville

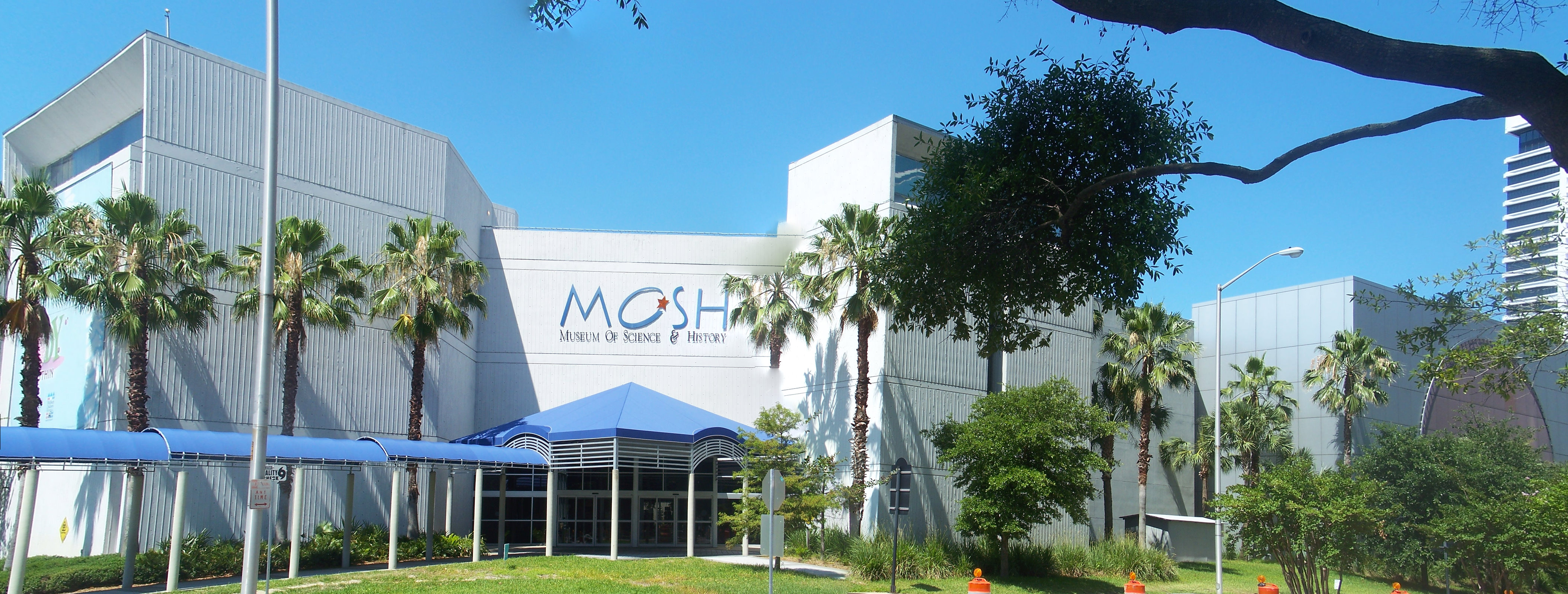
Museum of Science and History

=== Houses of worship ===
- 1883 St. George Episcopal Church, Carpenter Gothic, Robert Sands Schuyler
- 1887 St. Andrew's Episcopal Church, Gothic Revival, Robert Sands Schuyler
- 1903 Snyder Memorial Methodist Episcopal Church, Late Gothic Revival, J. H. W. Hawkins
- 1904 Bethel Church, Greek Revival/Romanesque Revival, M. H. Hubbard
- 1905 Mount Zion AME Church, Romanesque Revival, Francis J. Norton and J. B. Carr & Co.
- 1906 St. John's Cathedral, Gothic Revival, Snelling and Potter
- 1910 Basilica of the Immaculate Conception, Late Gothic Revival, M. H. Hubbard
- 1917 Our Lady of the Angels Catholic Church, Late Gothic Revival
- 1927 Riverside Baptist Church, Romanesque Revival, Addison Mizner
- 1967 St. Paul's by-the-Sea Episcopal Church, Mid-century modern, Blake Ellis
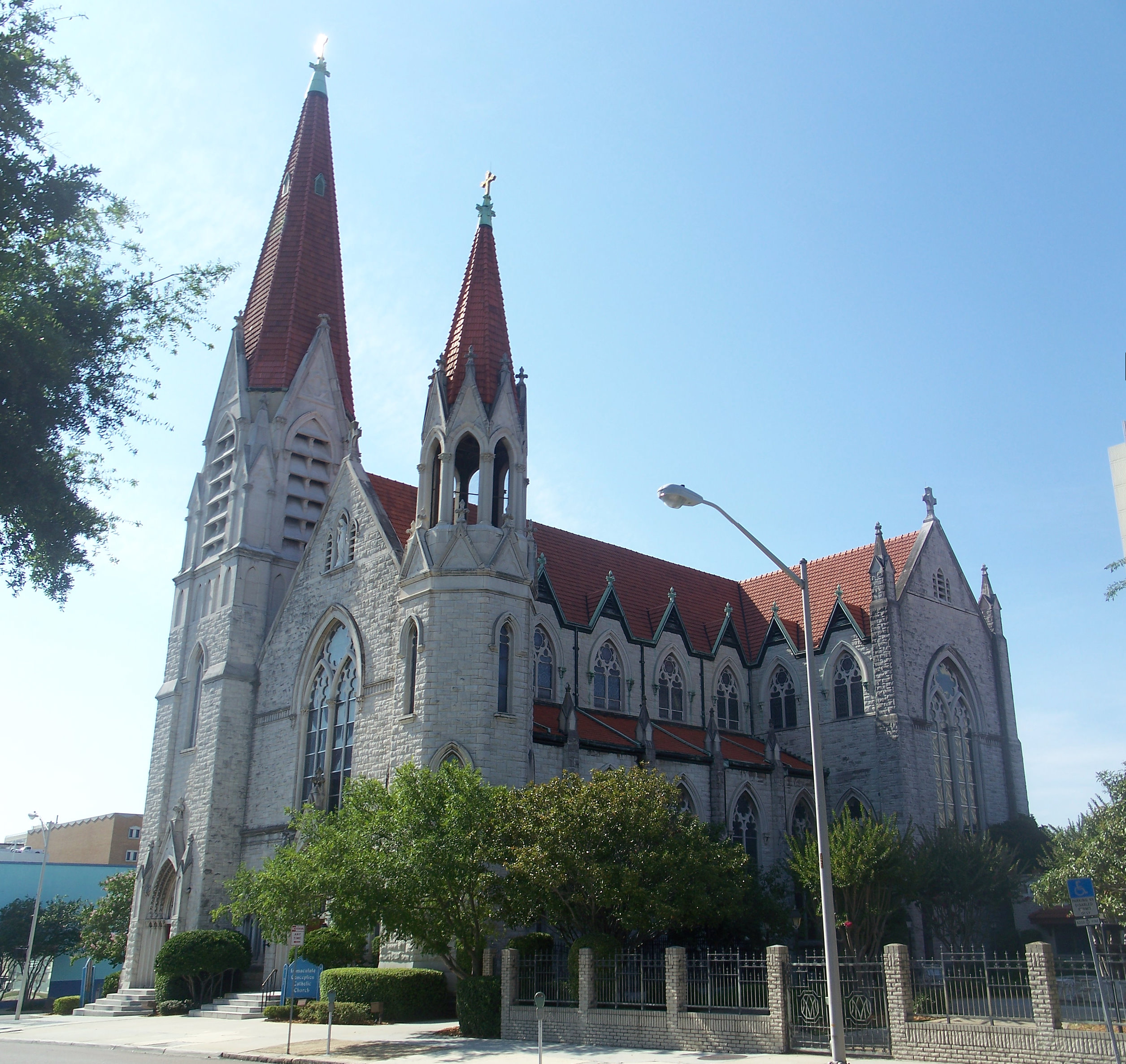
Immaculate Conception Catholic Church

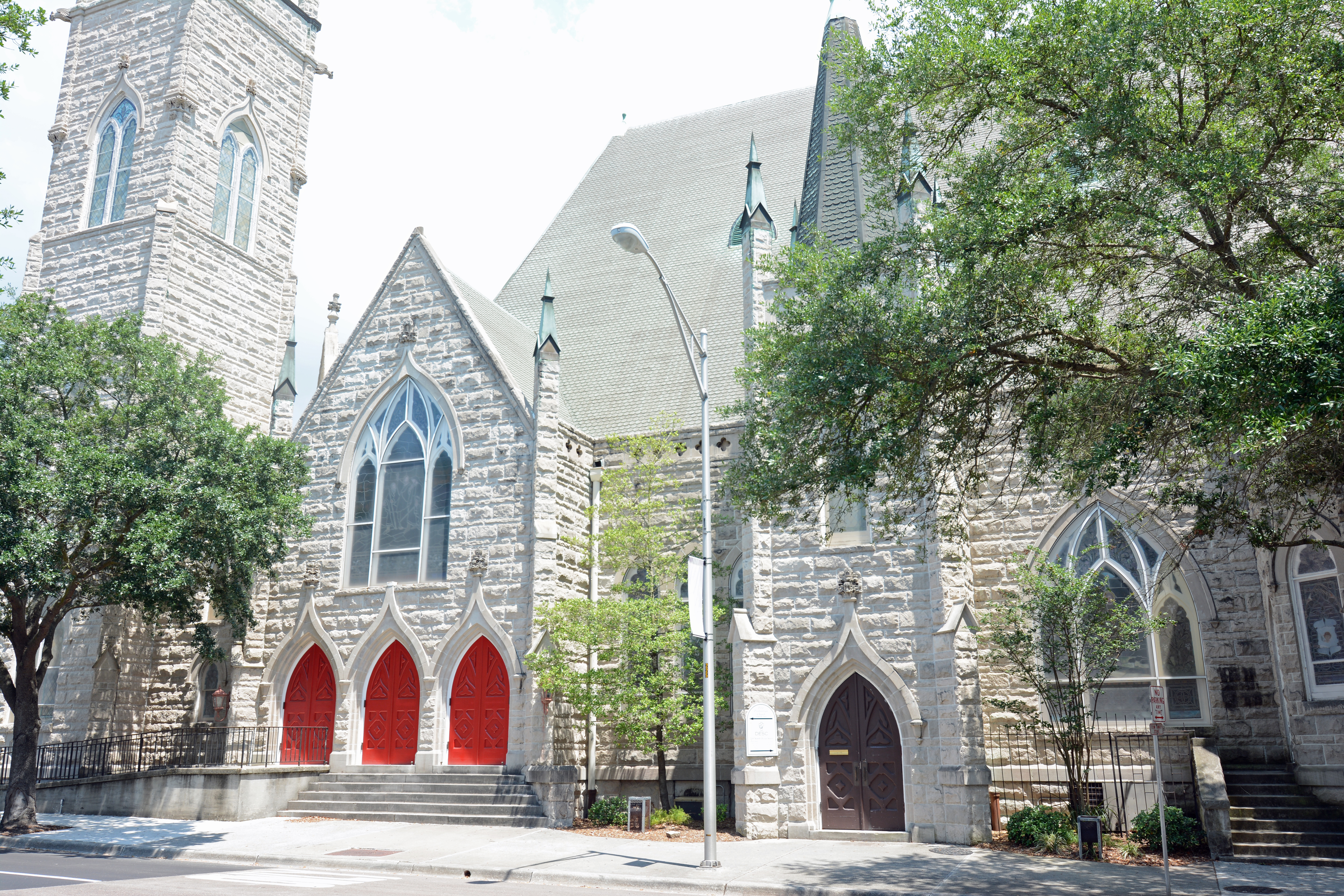
First Presbyterian Church

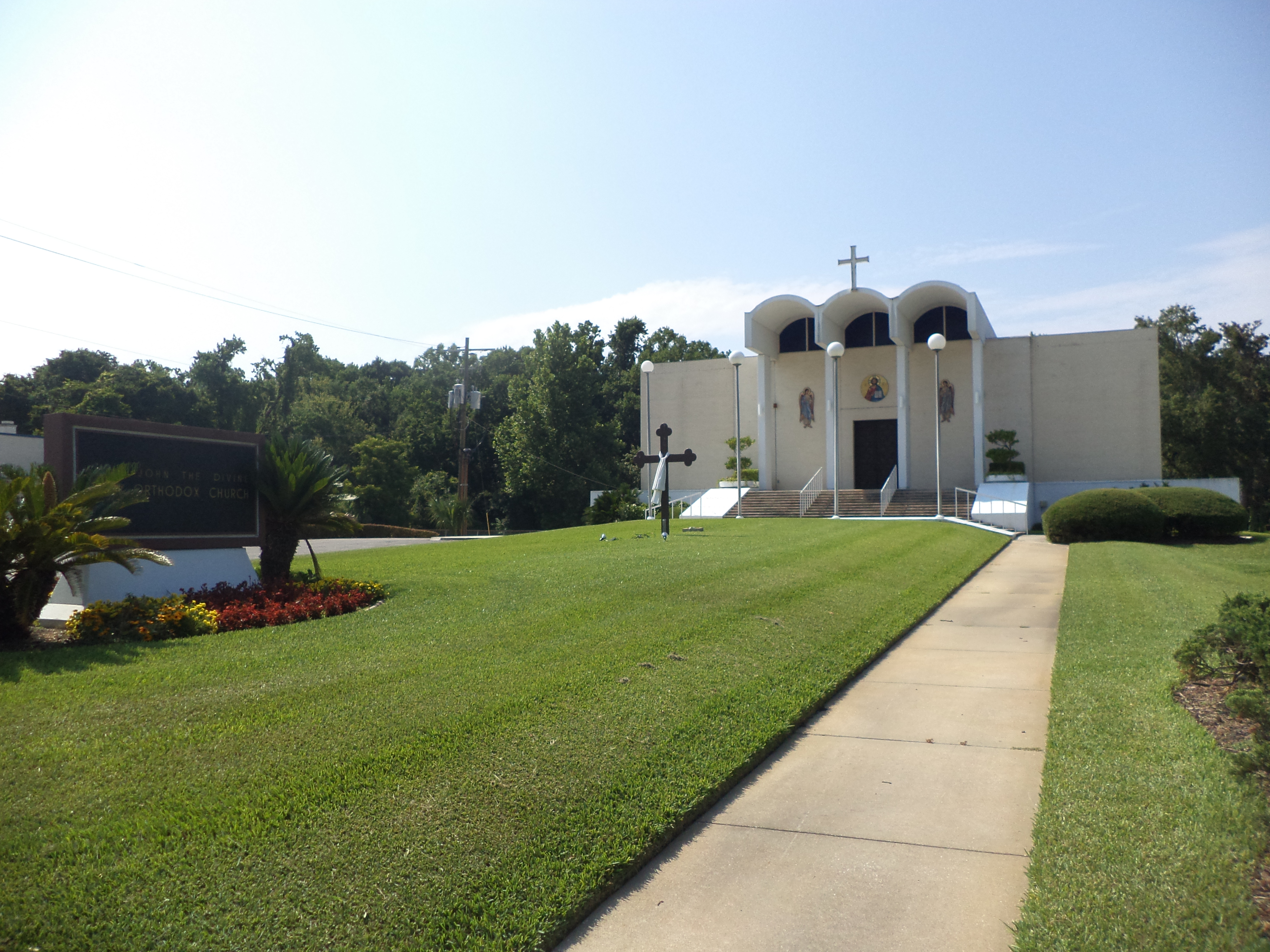
St. John the Divine Greek Orthodox Church

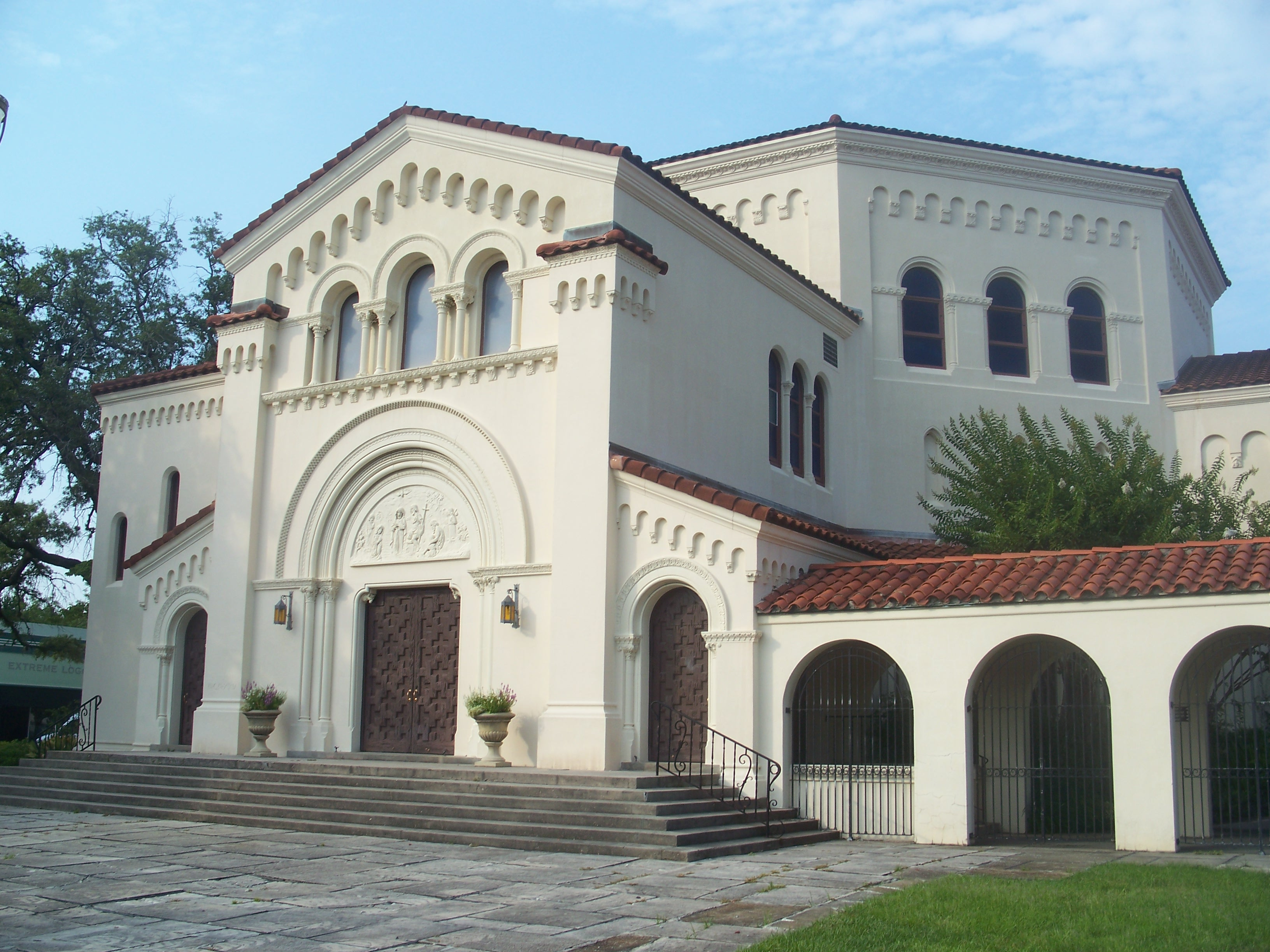
Riverside Baptist Church

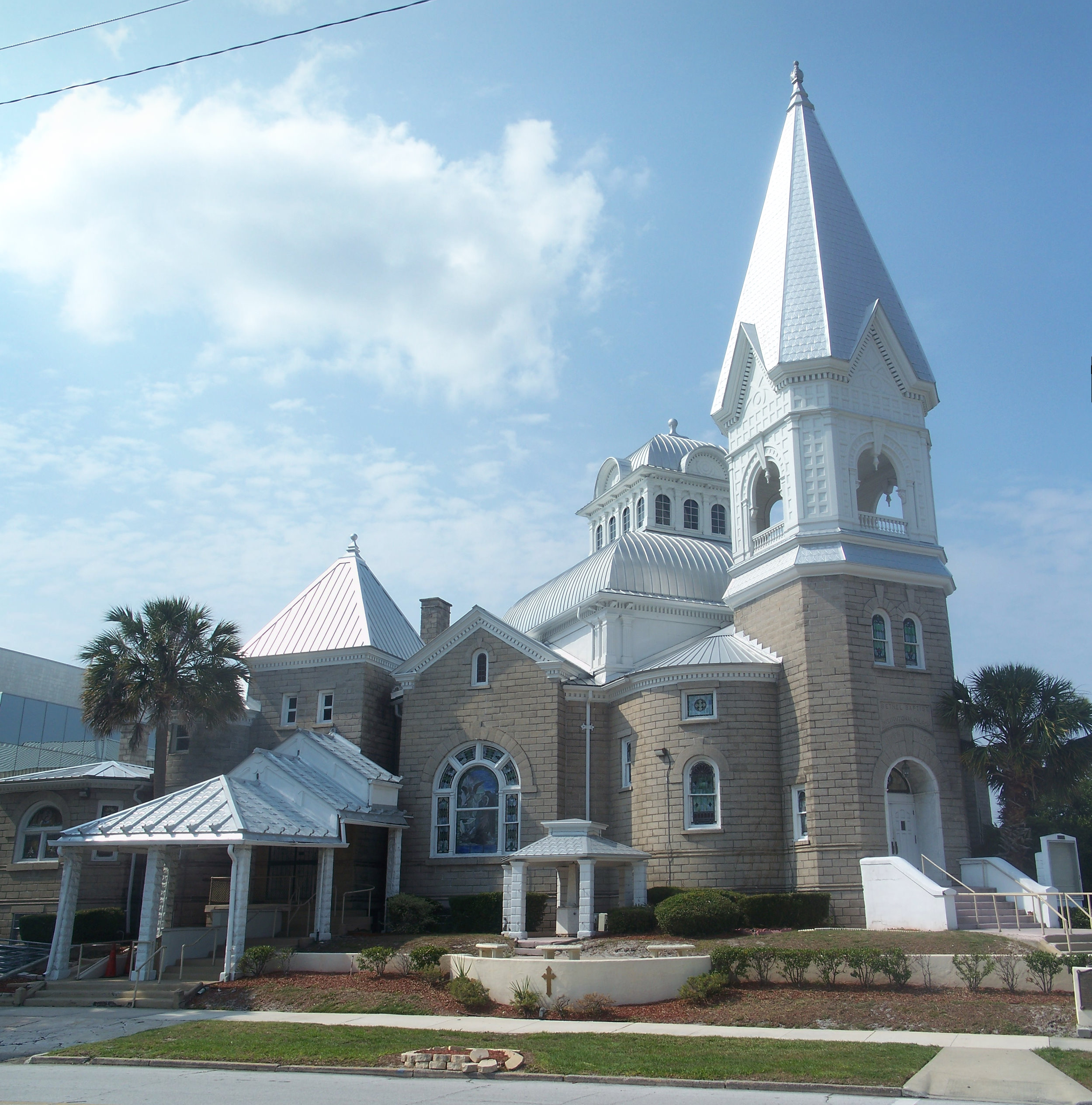
Bethel Church

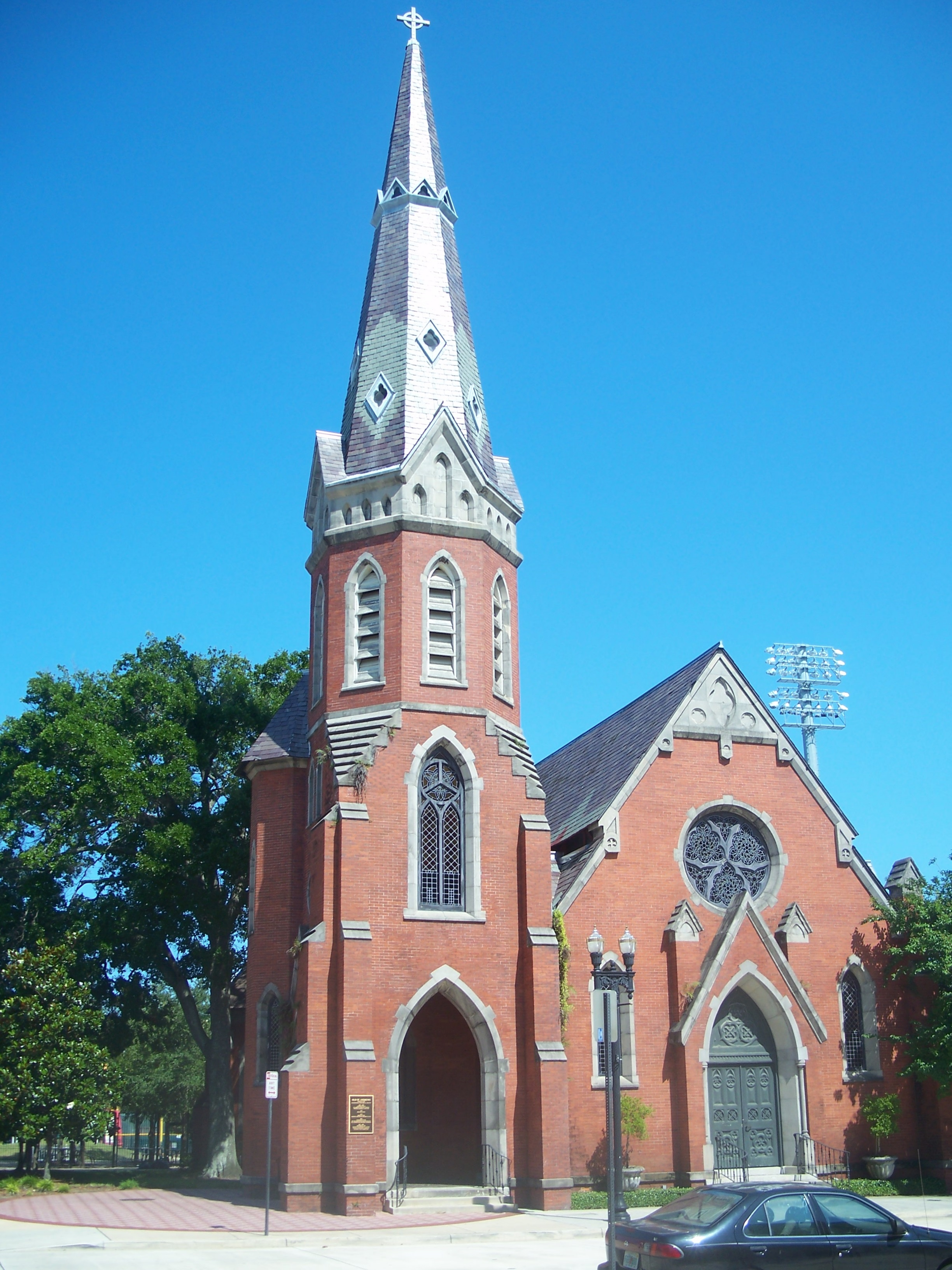
St. Andrews

== Cultural architecture ==
=== Entertainment venues ===
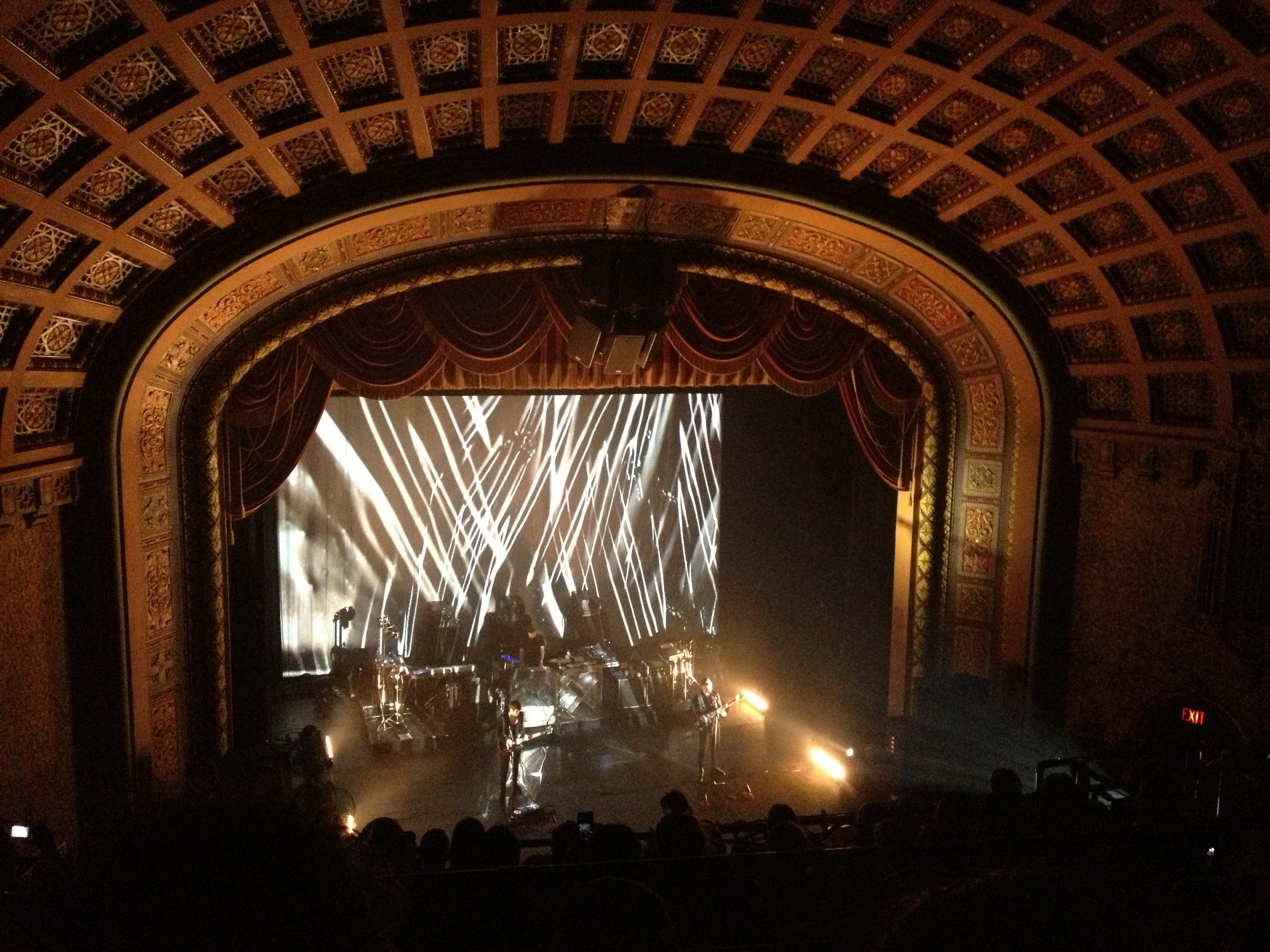
Interior of the Mediterranean Revival style Florida Theatre, designed by Roy A. Benjamin, and opening in the 1927

The city host a number of music and performance venues, most notably the Florida Theatre. Designed by local architect Roy A. Benjamin, the Mediterranean Revival style theater opened in 1927. Benjamin designed a number of other local venues, including the Renaissance Revival style Riverside Theatre in 1927 and the Art Deco style San Marco Theatre in 1939. Designed by Jefferson Davis Powell in 1929, the Ritz Theatre is another local example of Art Deco architecture in Jacksonville entertainment venues. The Mid-century modern Jacksonville Coliseum was built in 1960 and designed by A. Eugene Cellar and George Ryad Fisher. Demolished in 2003, the building exhibited what is now coined as Googie architecture. Built in the International Style in 1962, the Times-Union Center for the Performing Arts is one of many examples of buildings designed locally by the firm of Kemp, Bunch & Jackson. The newest addition to the local entertainment venue stock is the Populous designed Daily's Place. Completed in 2017, the venue is attached to the southern edge of Everbank Field.

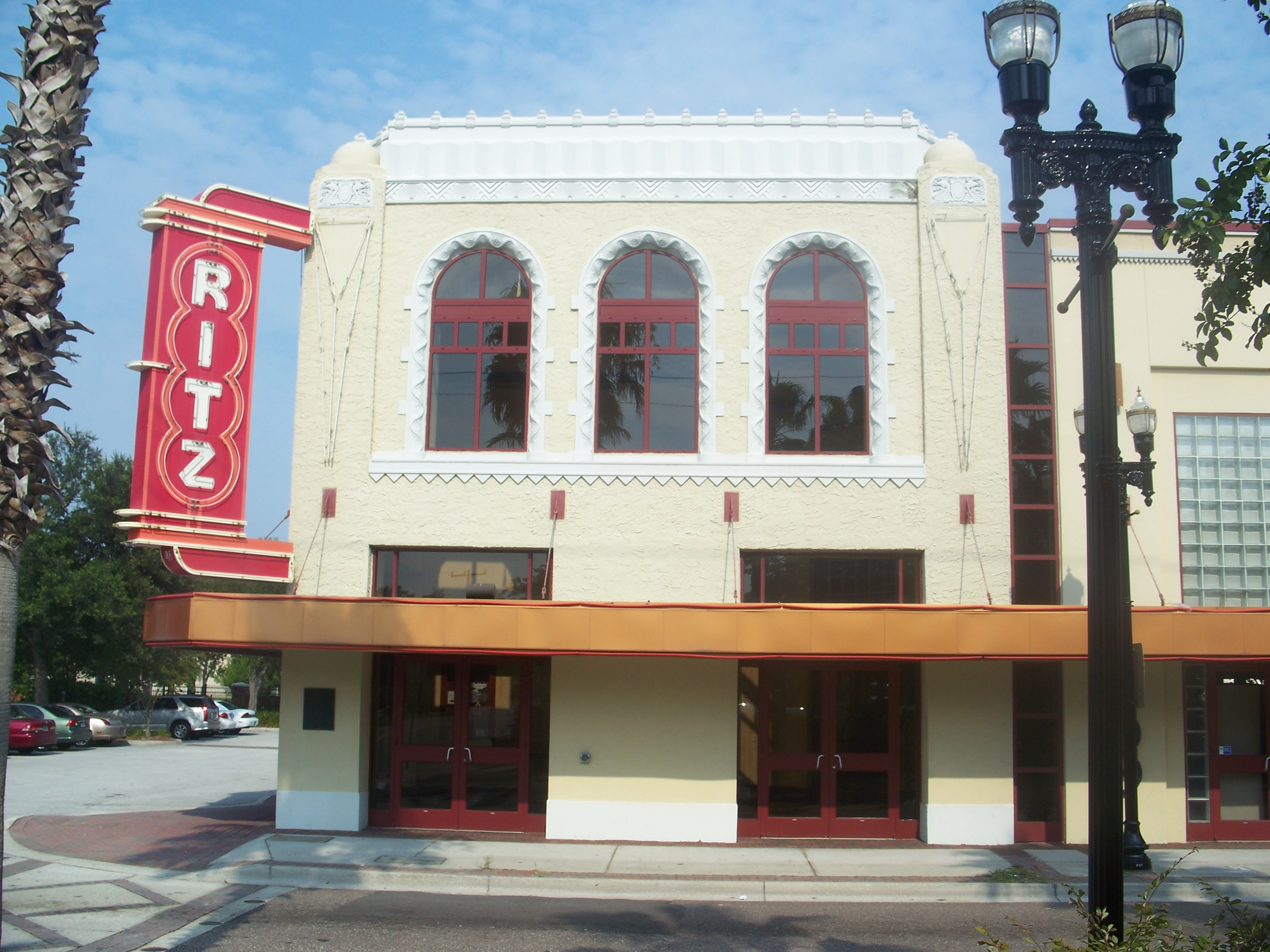
Ritz Theatre

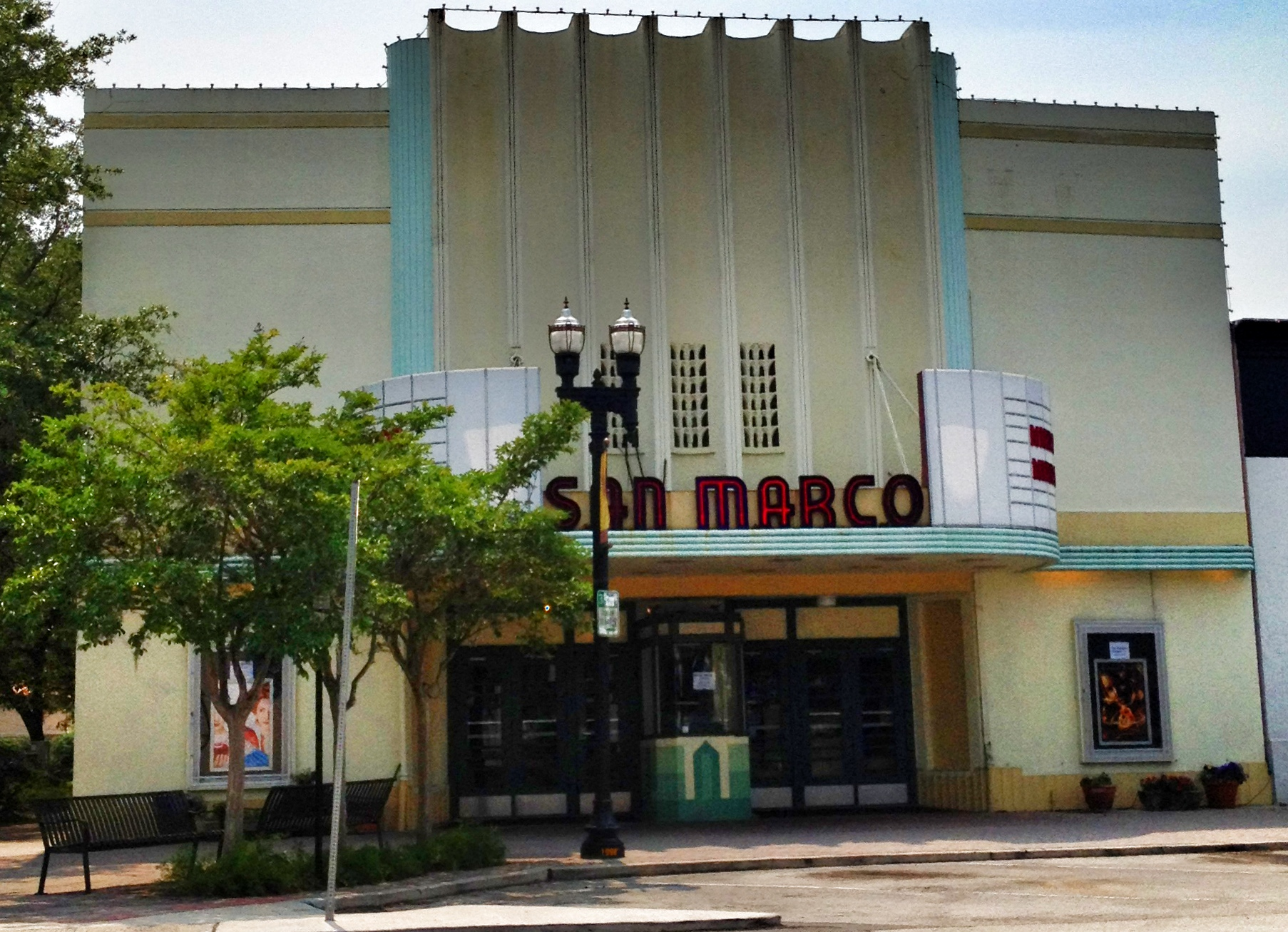
San Marco Theatre

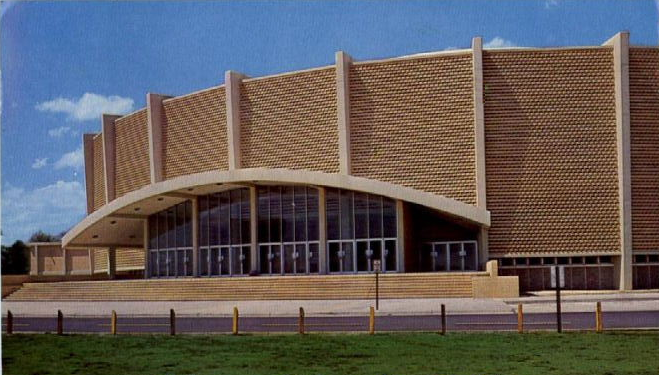
Jacksonville Coliseum (demolished)

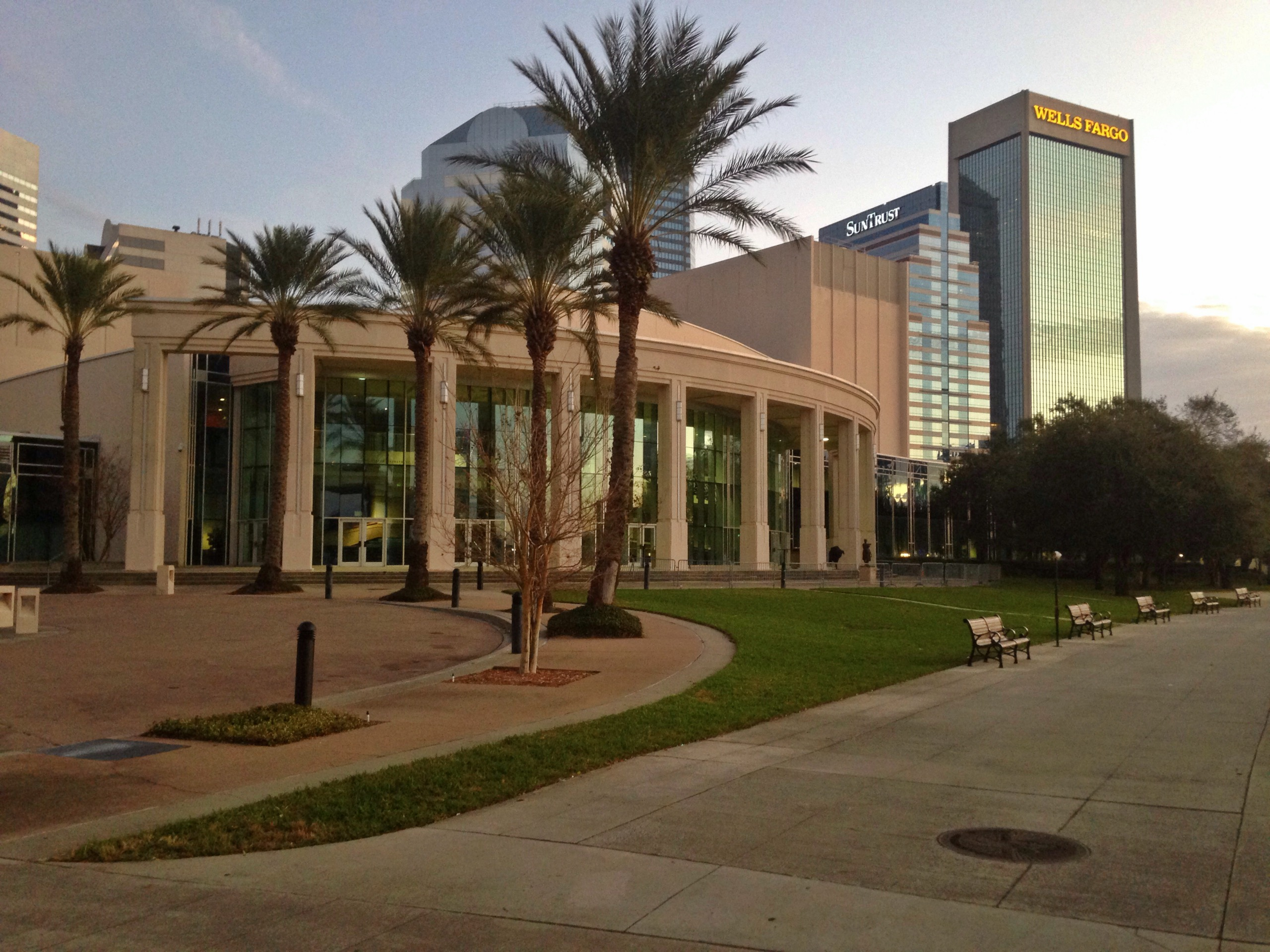
Times-Union Center for the Performing Arts

=== Sports venues ===
Jacksonville is home to several major sports venues, most notably EverBank Field, home stadium facility of the Jacksonville Jaguars of the National Football League (NFL). Completed in 1995, it was designed by the architecture firm HOK Sport. Opening in 2003, the Postmodern styled Baseball Grounds of Jacksonville and Veterans Memorial Arena were both designed by the architecture firm Populous.

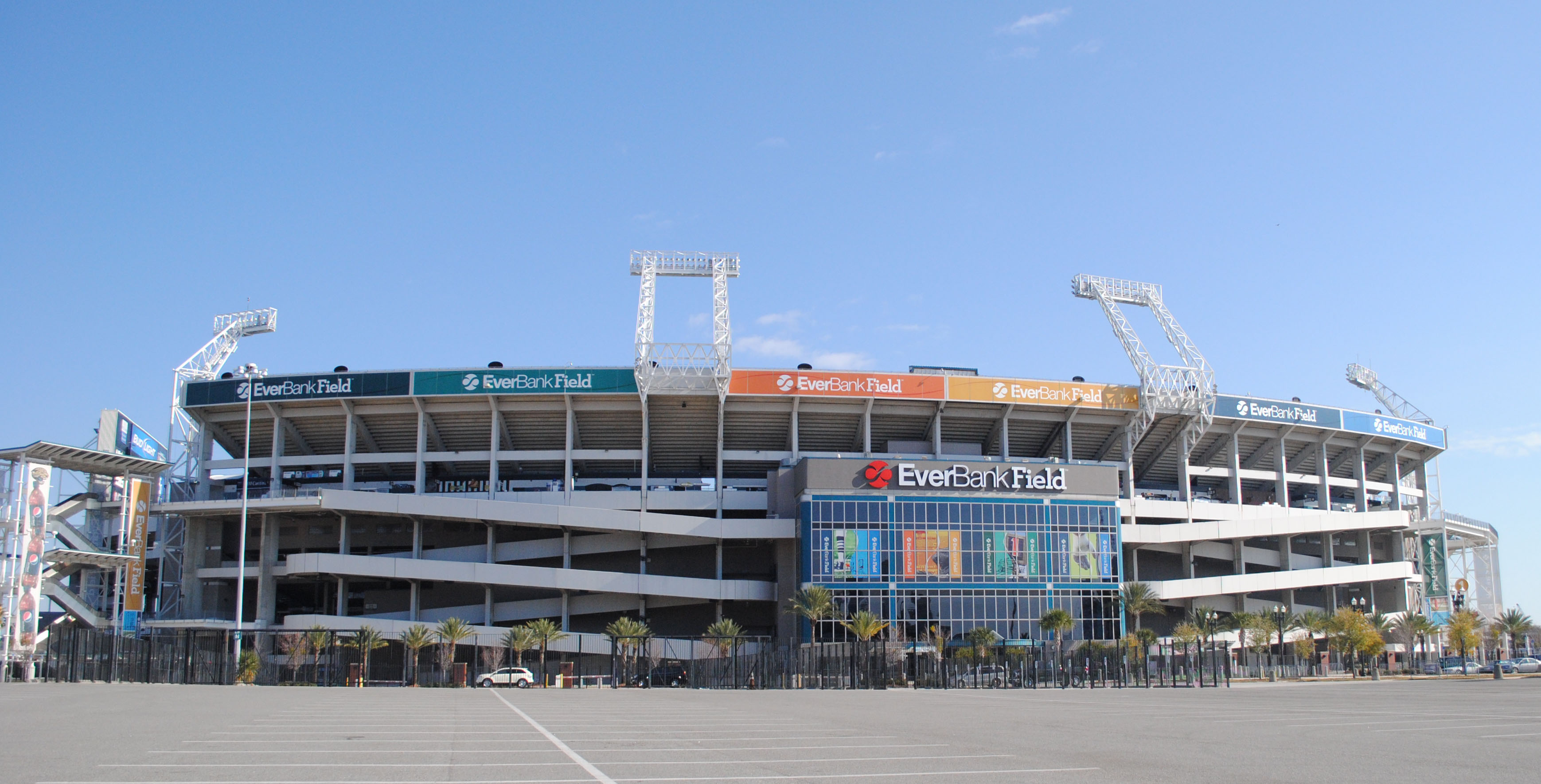
EverBank Field

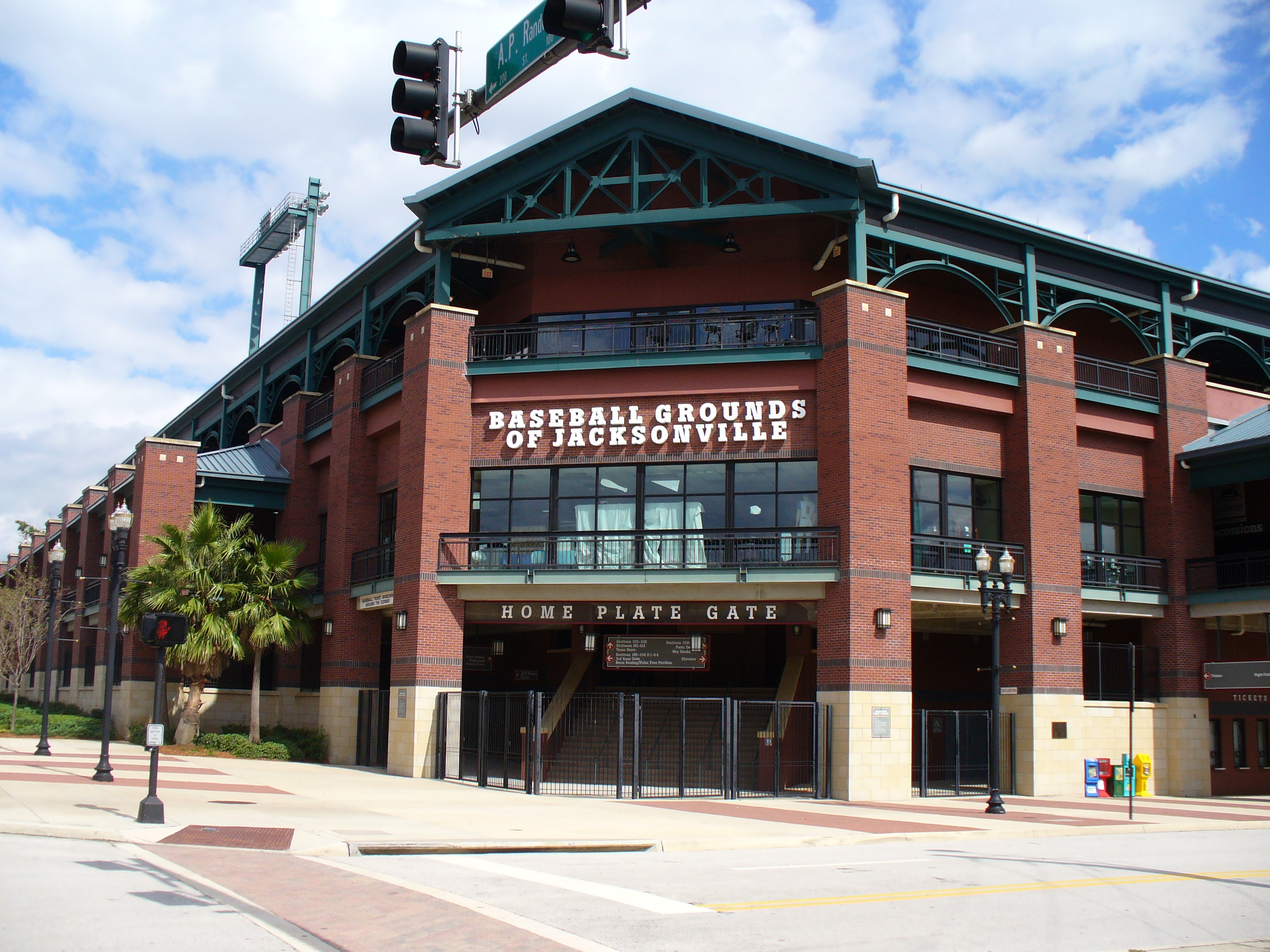
Baseball Grounds of Jacksonville

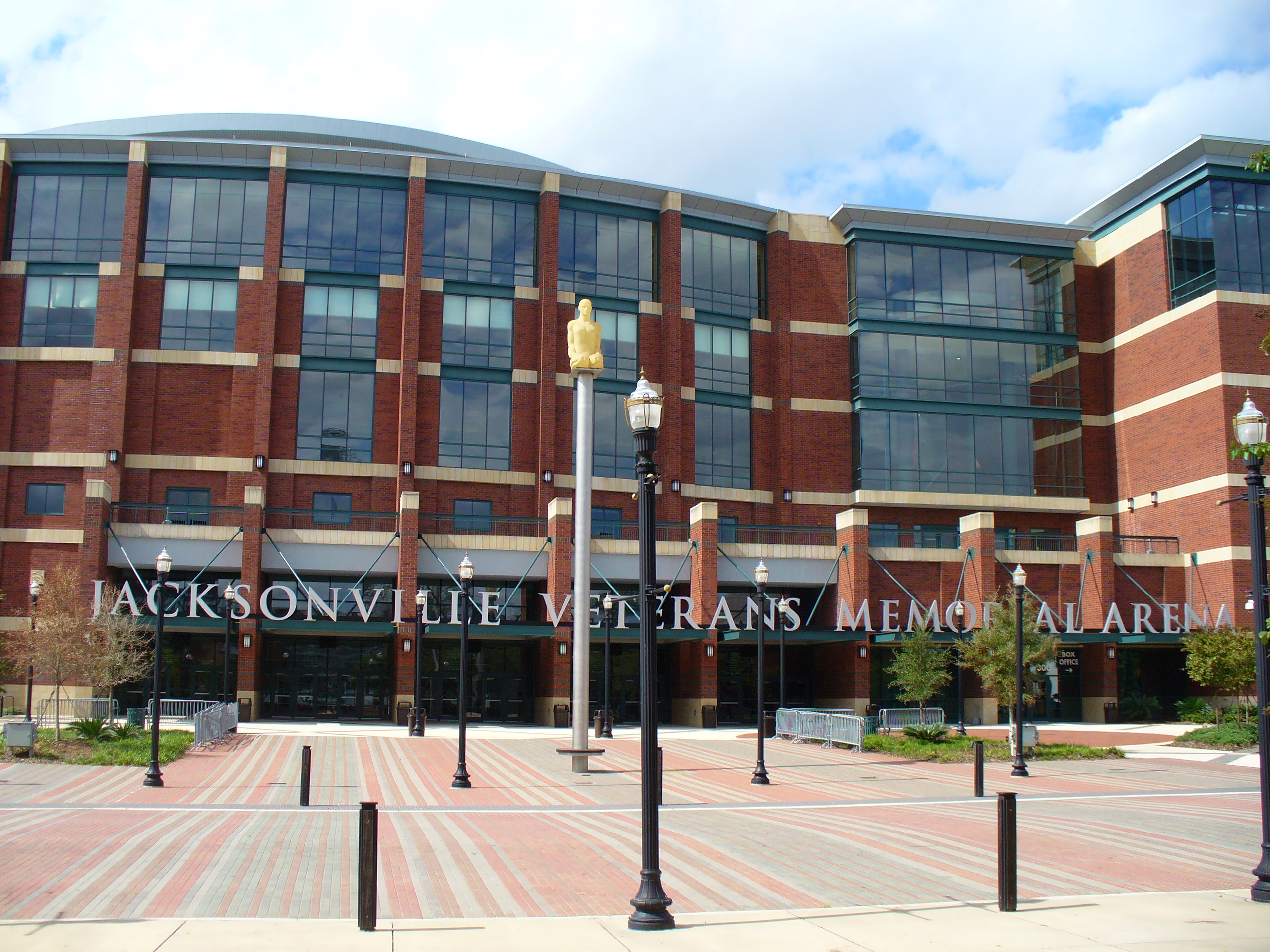
Veterans Memorial Arena

== Transportation architecture ==
- 1895 Flagler Depot (partially demolished in 1918)
- 1919 Union Station, Beaux-arts, Kenneth M. Murchison and W.B.W. Howe
- 1968 Original Jacksonville International Airport Terminal
- 2005 Jacksonville International Airport
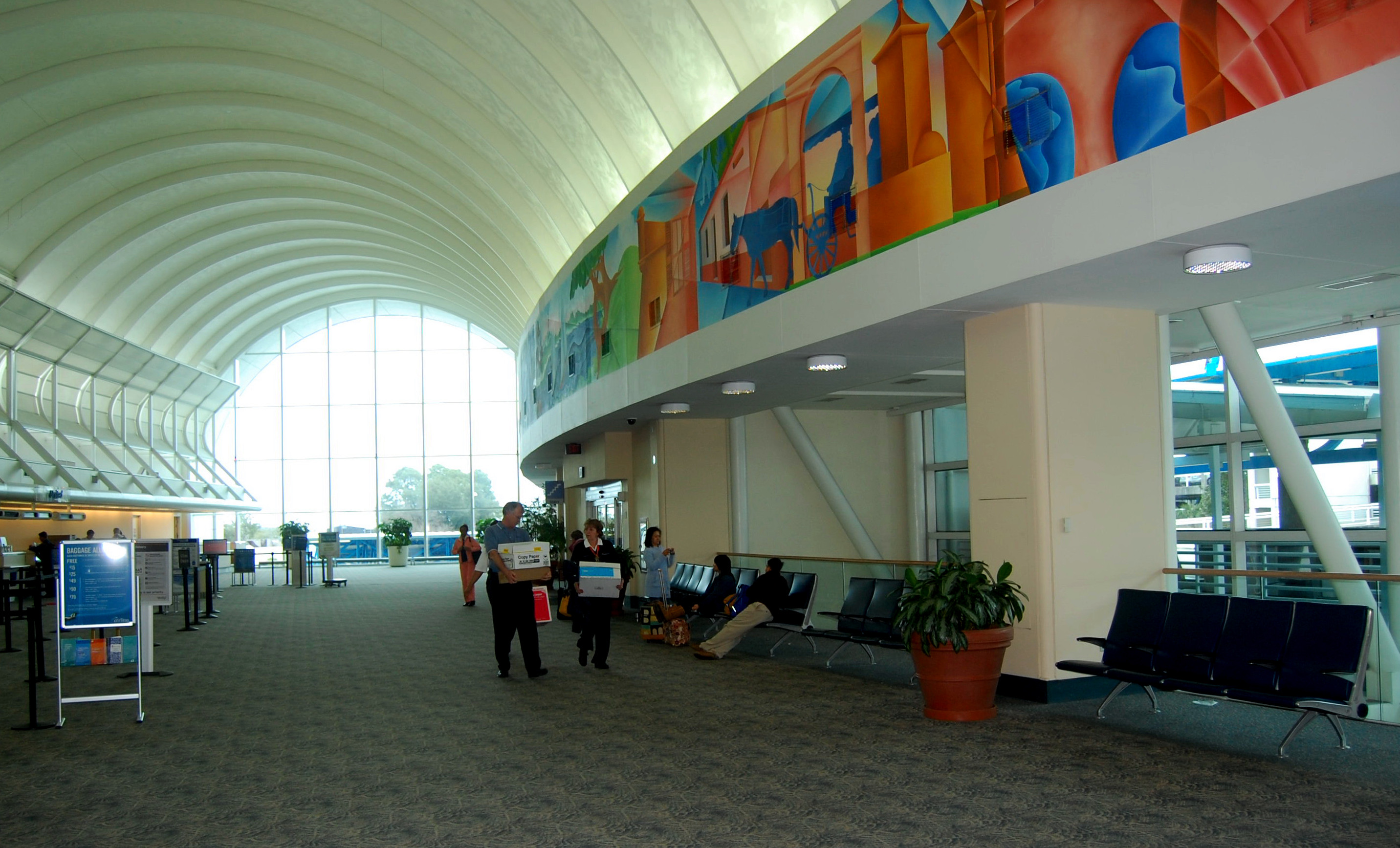
Interior of Jacksonville International Airport

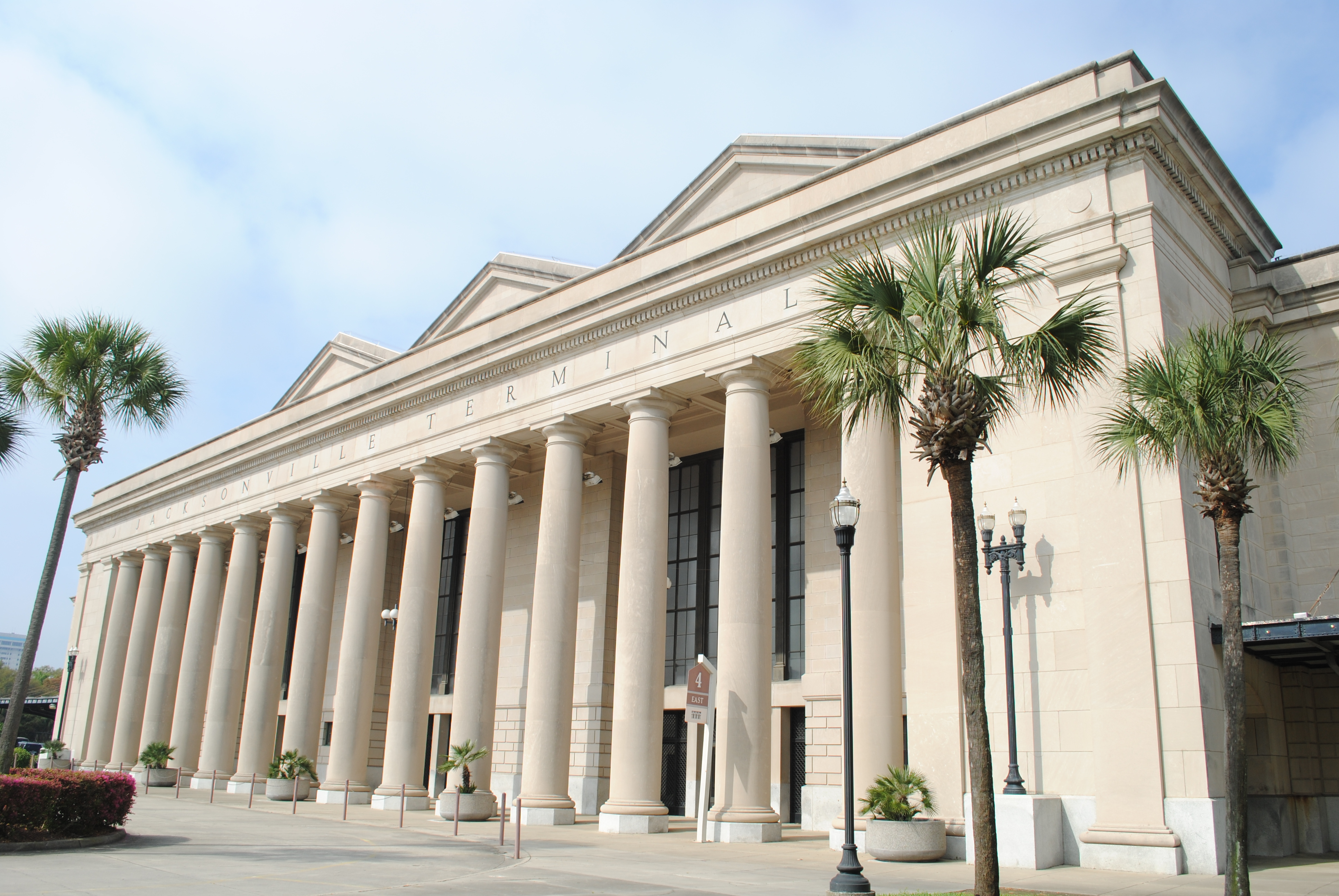
Jacksonville Terminal

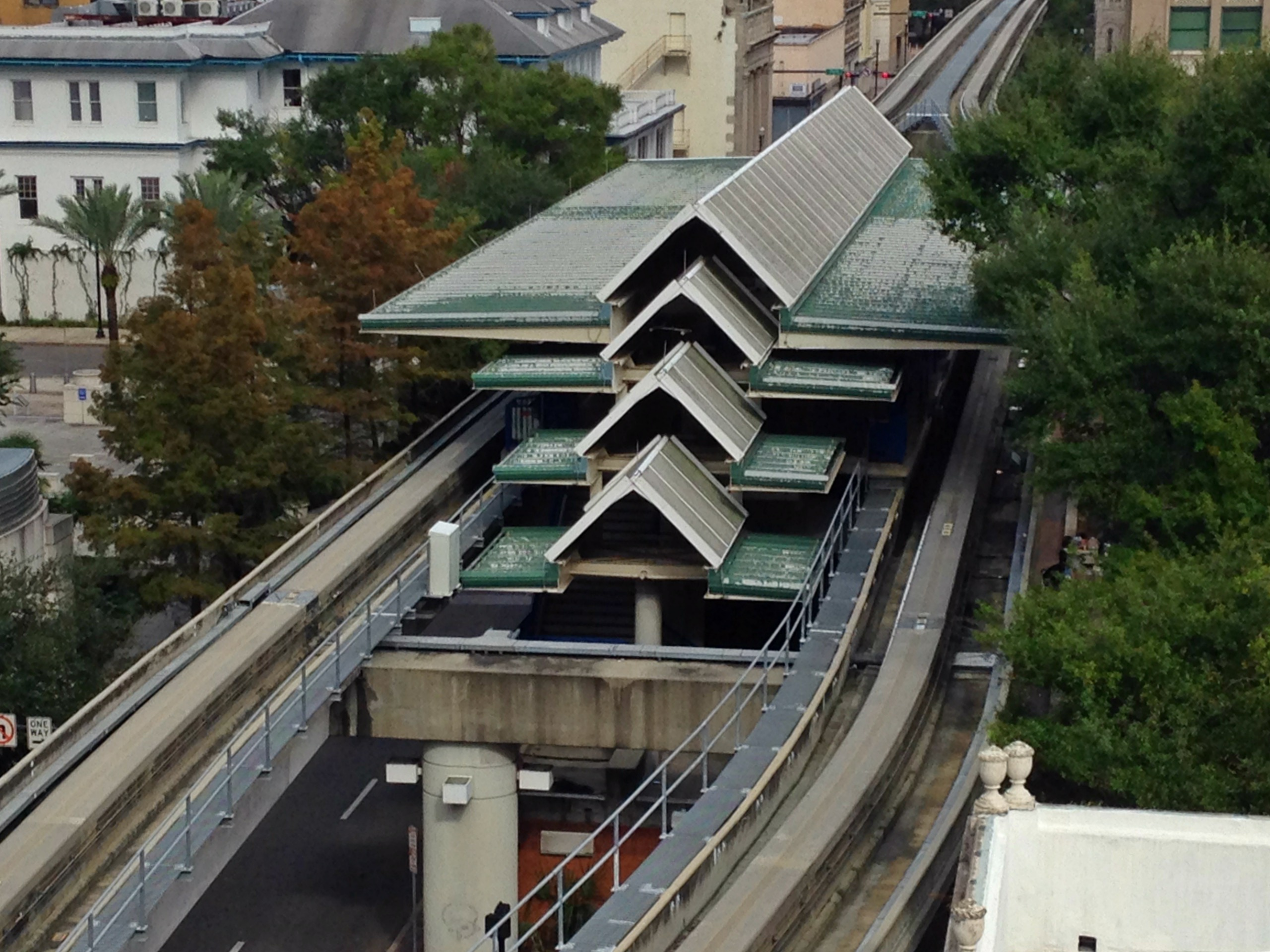
James Weldon Johnson Park station

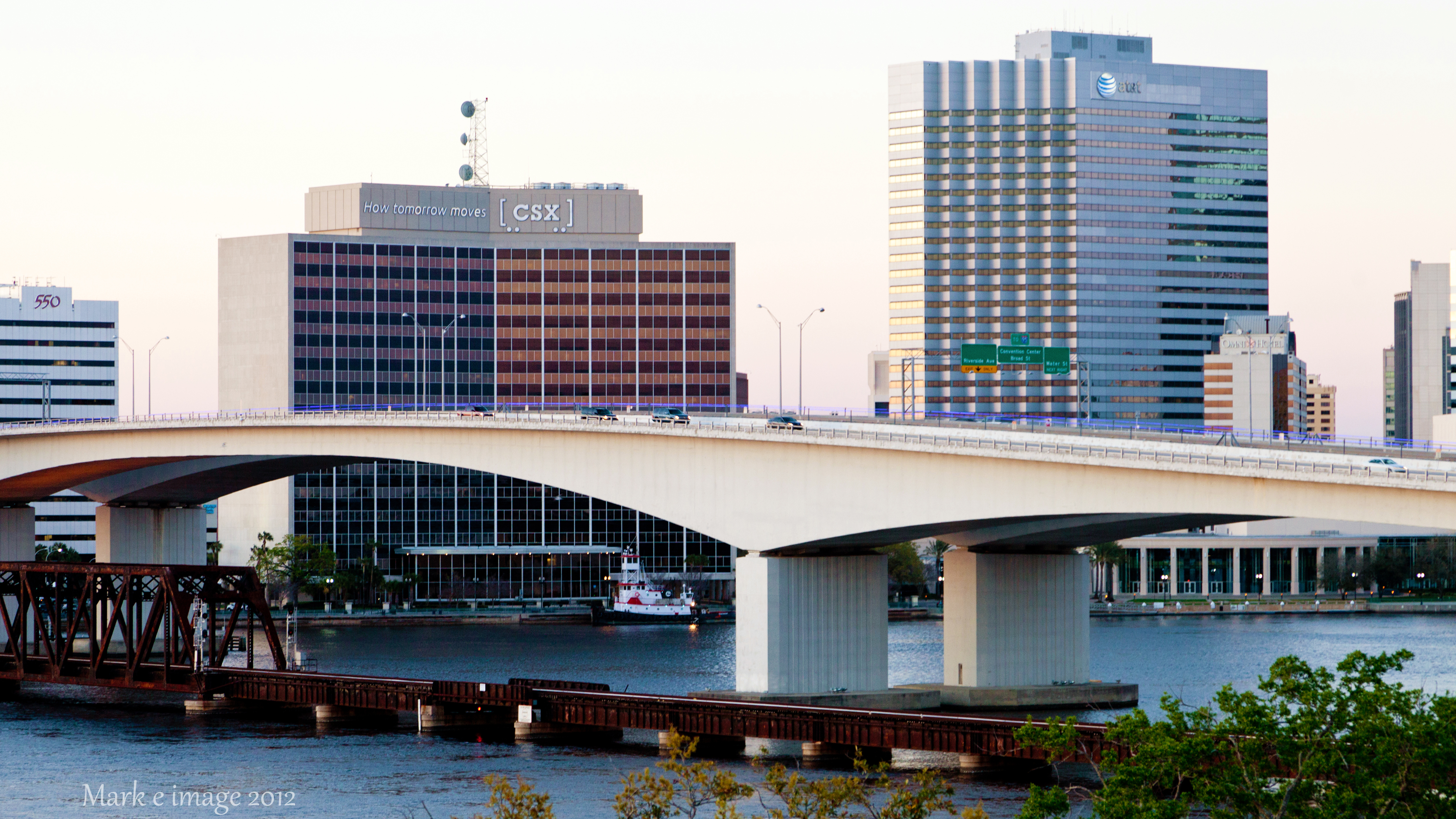
Acosta Bridge

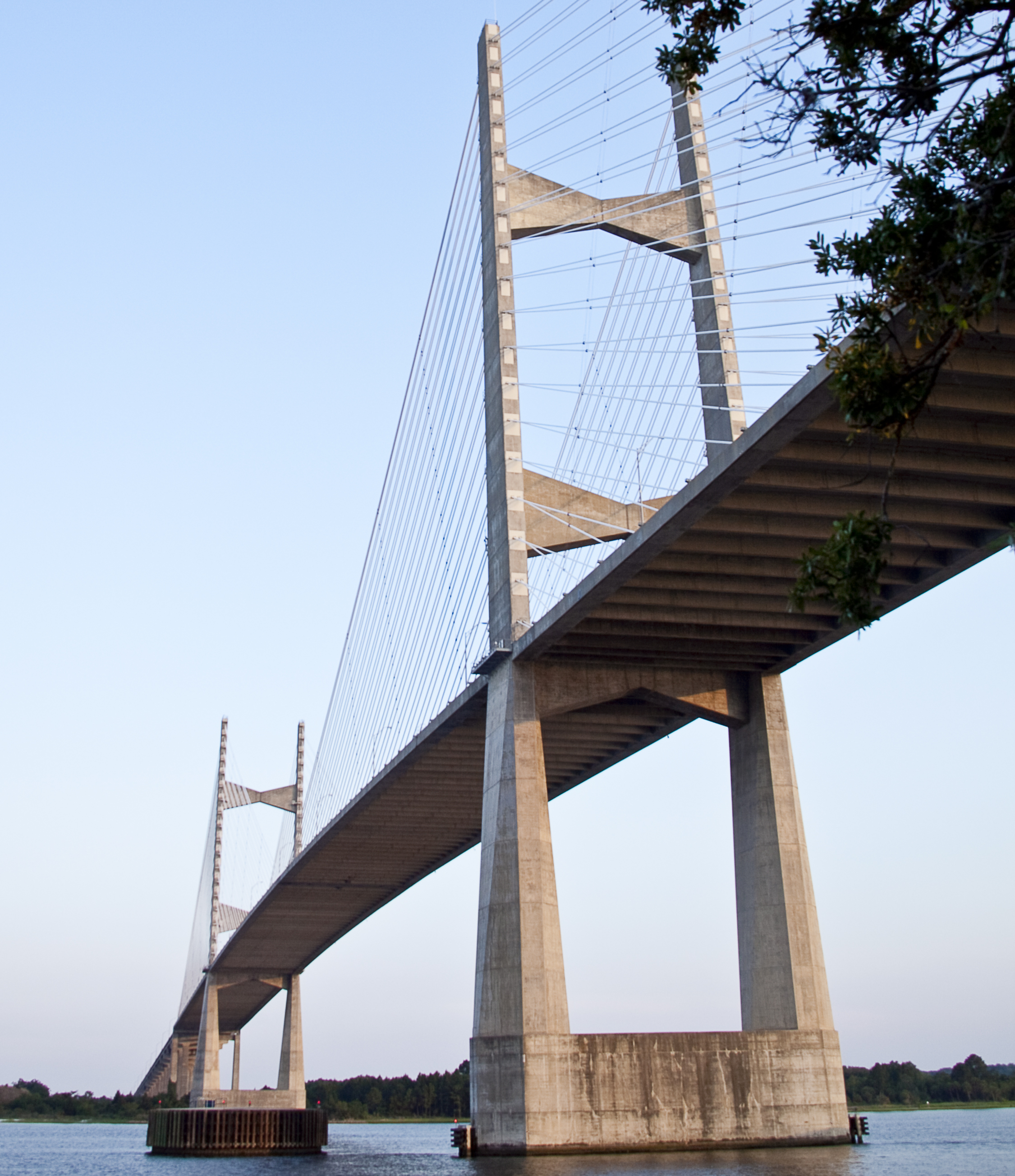
Dames Point Bridge

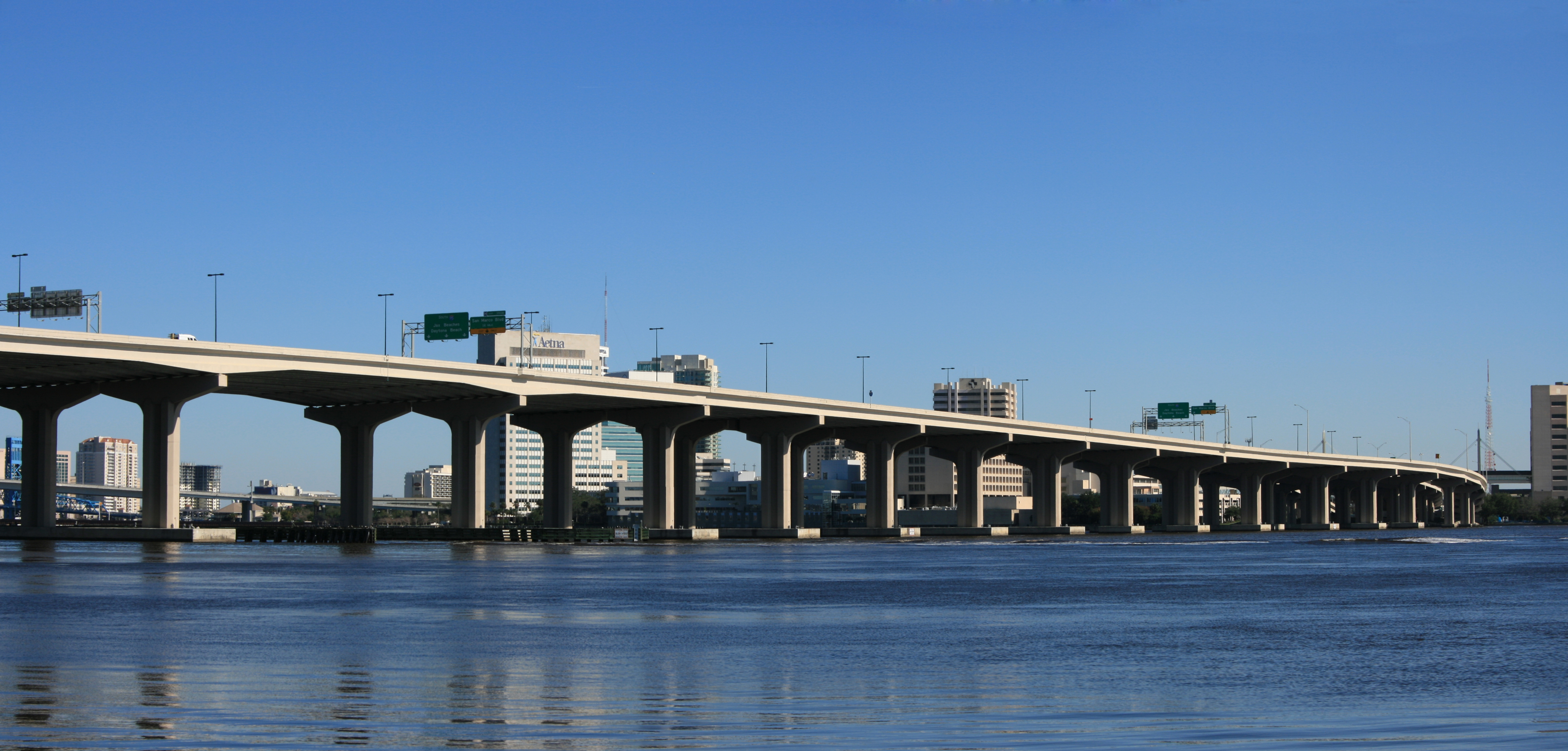
Fuller Warren Bridge

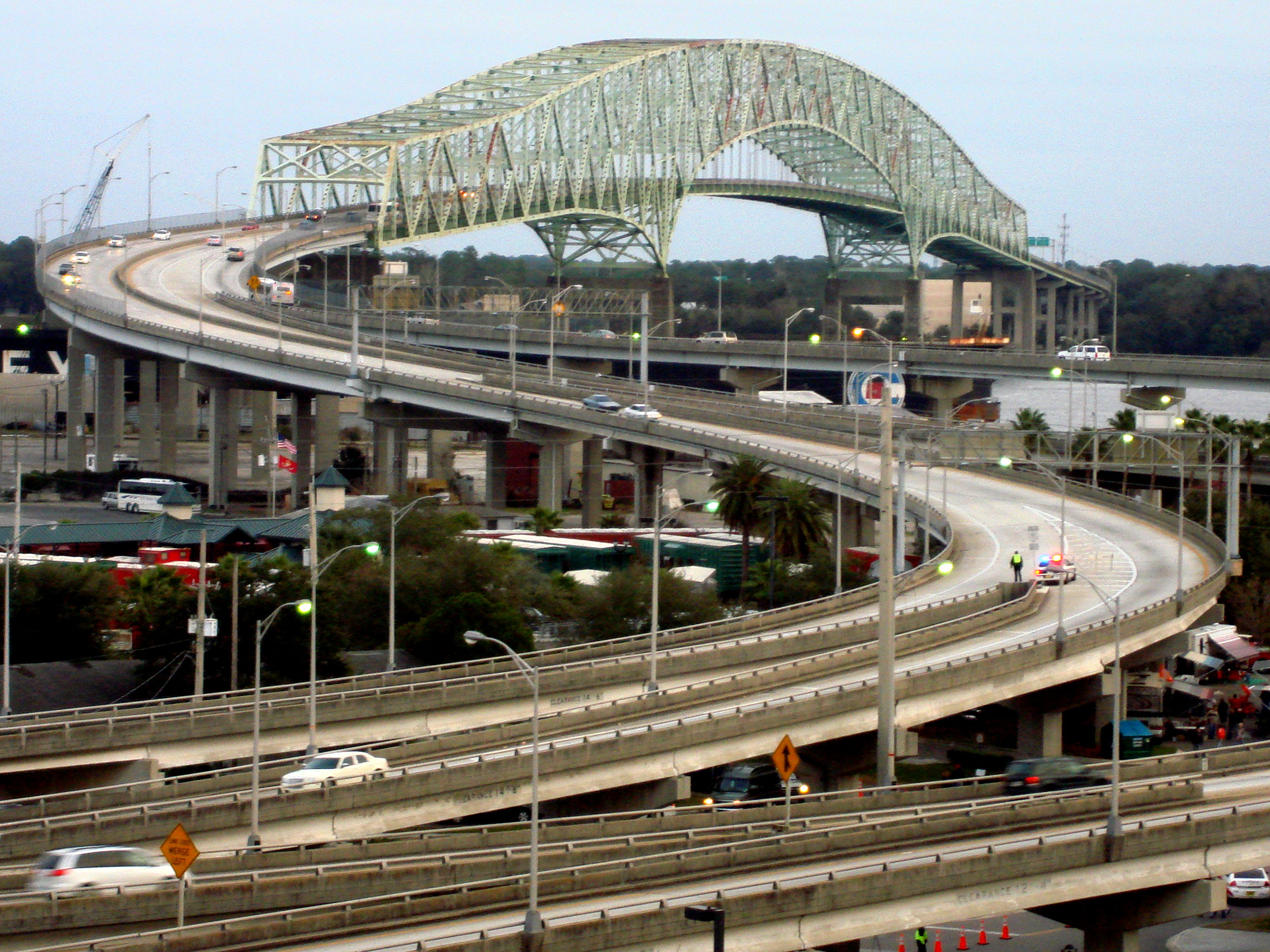
Hart Bridge

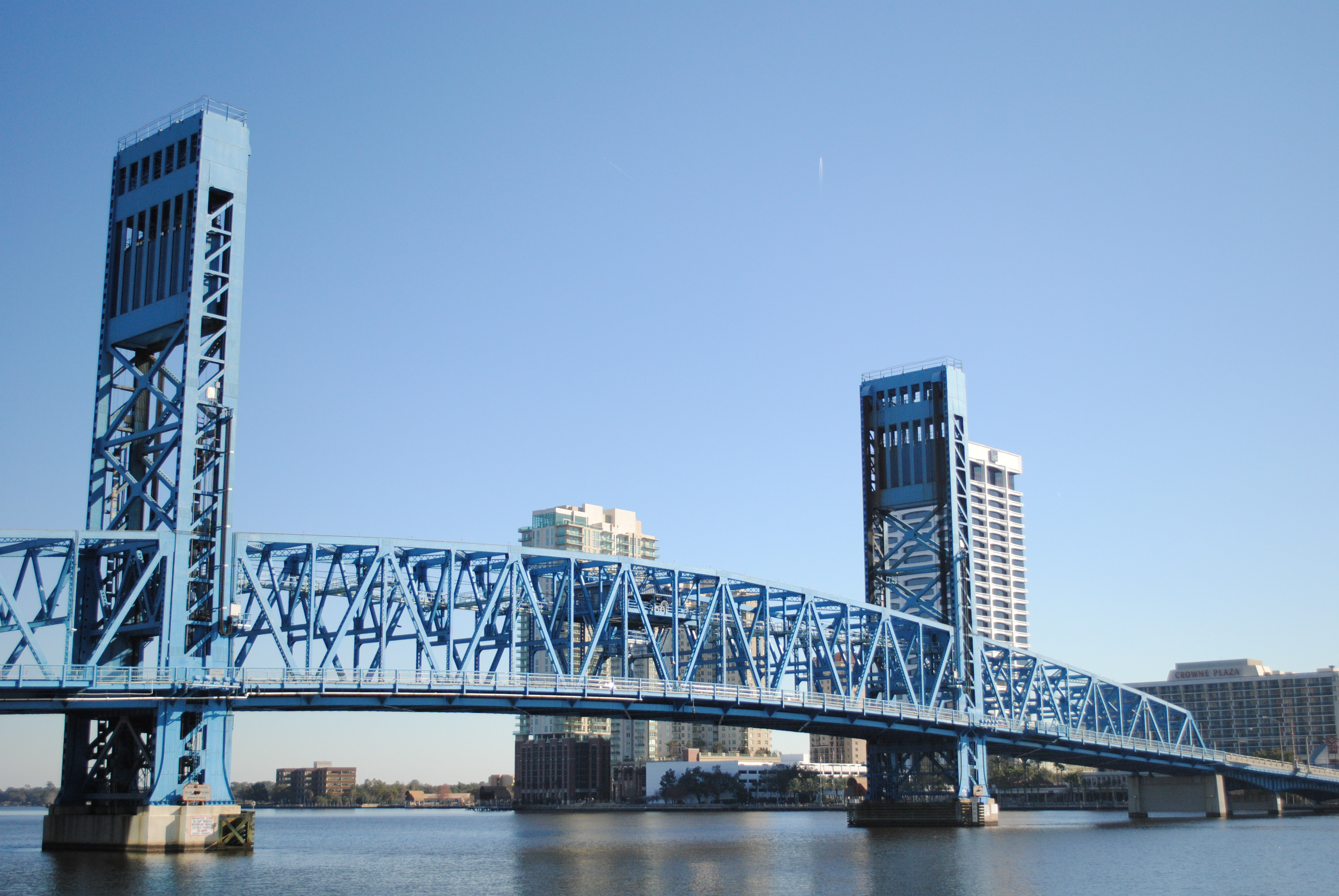
Main St Bridge

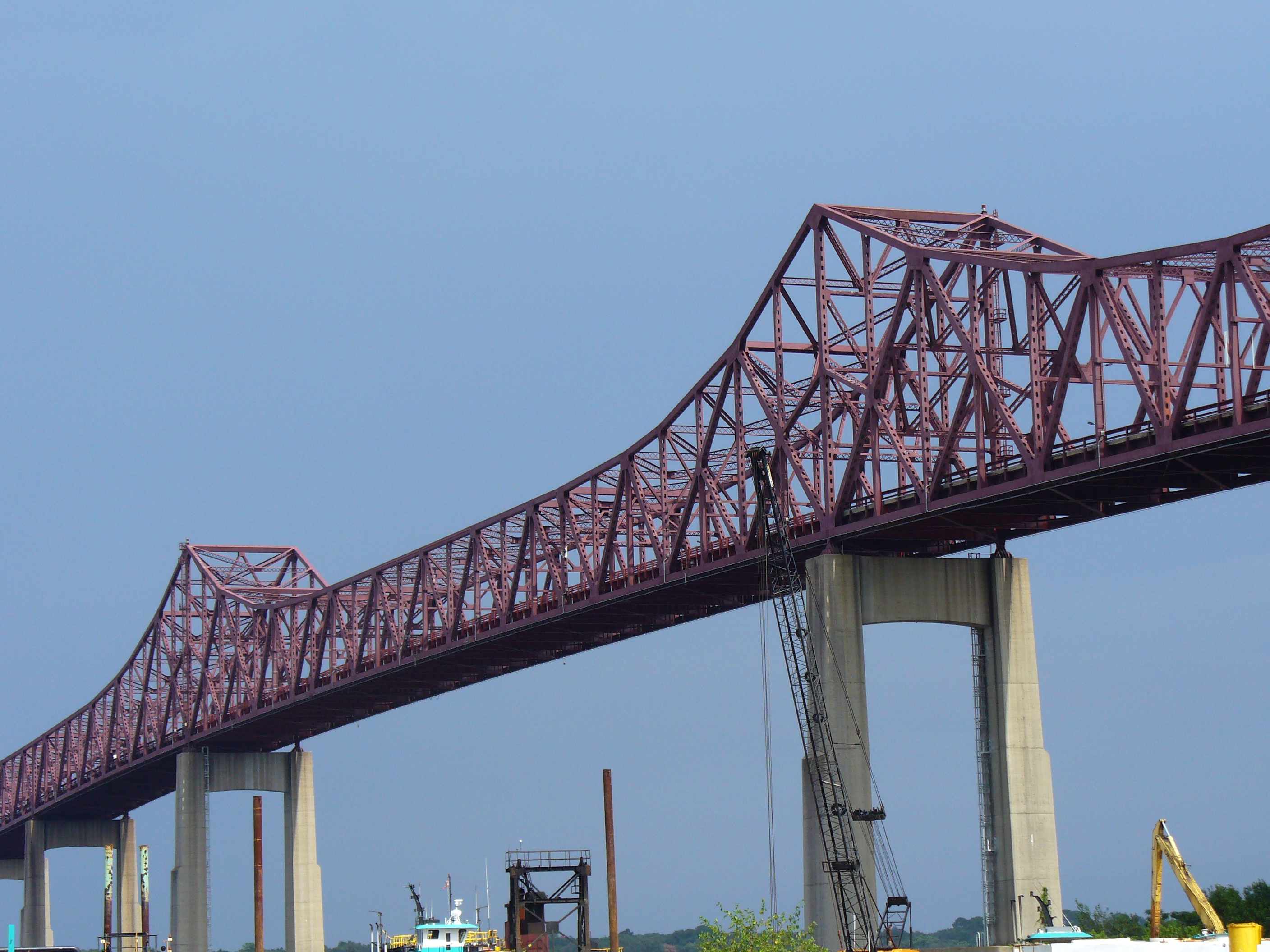
Mathews Bridge

== Parks and historic sites ==
- 1564 Fort Caroline (destroyed in 1568; reconstructed in late 20th century)
- 1797 Kingsley Plantation
- 1852 Old City Cemetery
- 1857 James Weldon Johnson Park (formerly Hemming Park, originally City Park)
- 1878 Old St. Luke's Hospital 314 North Palmetto
- 1899 Klutho Park (originally Springfield Park)
- 1919 Memorial Park, Olmsted Brothers and Roy A. Benjamin
- 1947 American Red Cross Volunteer Life Saving Corps Station, Art Moderne, Jefferson Davis Powell
- 1965 Friendship Fountain, Mid-century modern, Taylor Hardwick
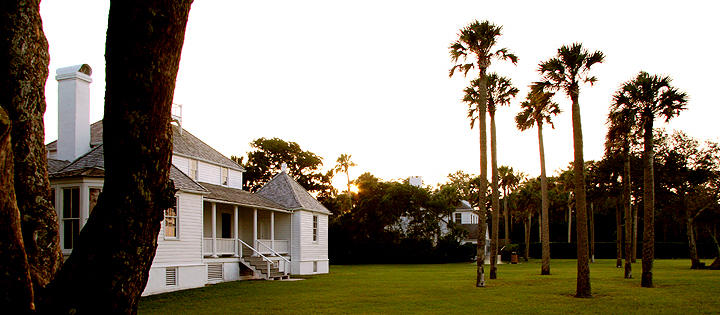
Kingsley Plantation

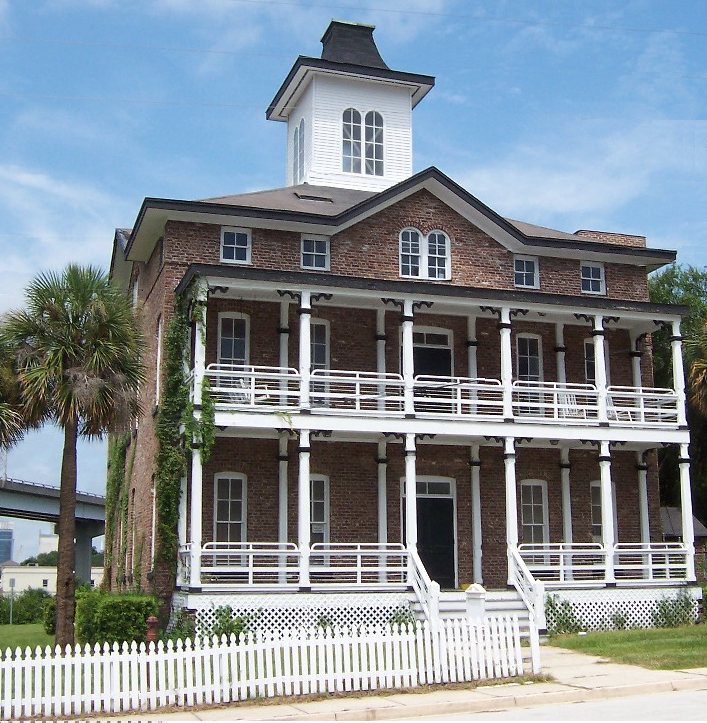
Old St. Luke Hospital

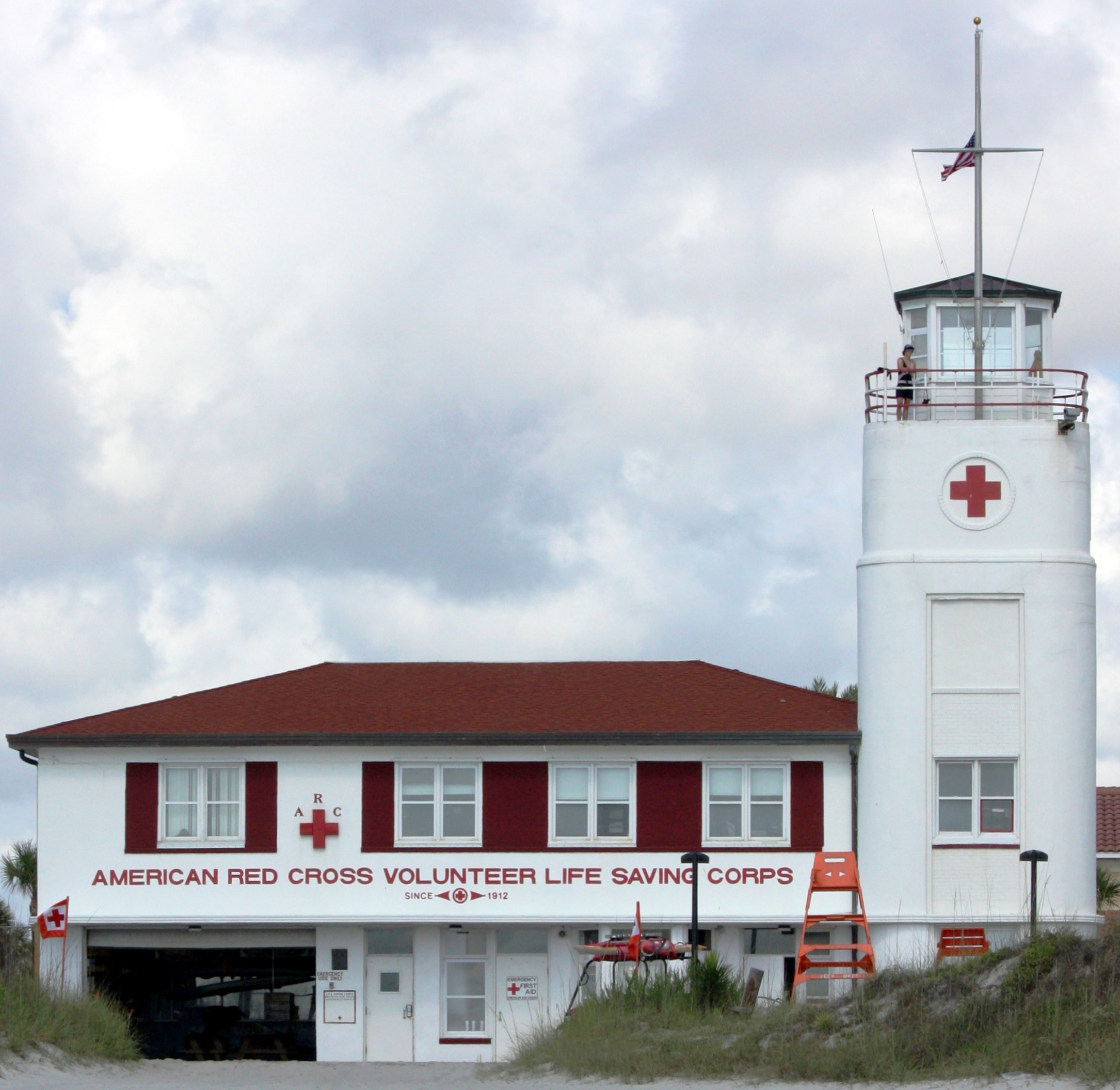
American Red Cross Volunteer Life Saving Corps Station

== Tallest buildings ==
The 10 tallest standard structures:

Std. rank	Name	Year	Location (Downtown)	Floors	Standard height ft	Std. hgt m	Notes
1	Bank of America Tower	1990	North Laura Street & West Bay Street	42	617	188	
2	Wells Fargo Center	1974	Laura Street & Independent Drive	37	535	163	
3	EverBank Center	1983	West Bay Street & Pearl Street	32	447	136	
4	The Peninsula at St. Johns Center	2006	1401 Riverplace Boulevard	36	437	133	
5	Riverplace Tower	1967	Riverplace Boulevard & Flagler Avenue	28	432	132	
6	SunTrust Tower	1989	Laura Street & Independent Drive	24	357	109	
7	The Strand at St. Johns Center	2006	1401 Riverplace Boulevard	28	328	100	
8	Eight Forty One	1954	841 Prudential Drive	22	309	94	
9	Two Prudential Plaza	1985	Museum Circle & San Marco Boulevard	21	305	93	
10	One Enterprise Center	1986	Water & Hogan Streets	21	299	91	

Chronology of the tallest buildings in Jacksonville:

Years tallest (Florida)	Years tallest (city)	Name	Std. hgt ft/m	Floors	Year completed	Notes
1902–1909	1902–1909	Dyal-Upchurch Building	82 / 25	6	1902	
1909–1912	1909–1912	121 Atlantic Place	135 / 41	10	1909	
1912–1913	1912–1913	Florida Life Building	148 / 45	11	1912	
1913–1926	1913–1926	Heard National Bank Building	180 / 55	15	1913	
	1926–1954	Barnett National Bank Building	224 / 68	18	1926	
	1954–1967	Eight Forty One	309 / 94	22	1955	
1967–1972	1967–1974	Riverplace Tower	417 / 127	28	1967	
1974–1981	1974–1990	Wells Fargo Center	535 / 163	37	1974	
	1990–present	Bank of America Tower	617 / 188	42	1990	

== Accolades ==
"Florida Architecture: 100 places, 100 years", compiled by the Florida chapter of the American Institute of Architects.

Rank	Building	Architect
4	University of North Florida Student Union	Dasher, Reynolds & Belyea
6	St. Paul's by-the-Sea Episcopal Church	Blake Ellis
14	Bolles School	Marsh & Saxelbye
26	Florida Theatre	Roy A. Benjamin
48	Epping Forest	Marsh & Saxelbye
51	Jacksonville Public Library	Robert A. M. Stern
55	Unitarian Universalist Church	Robert C. Broward
57	Haydon Burns Library	Taylor Hardwick
64	St. James Building	Henry John Klutho
68	Chart House Restaurant	Kendrick Bangs Kellogg
70	Riverside Baptist Church	Addison Mizner
87	Riverplace Tower	Welton Becket
92	Florida Life Building	Henry John Klutho
96	Westminster Woods	Robert C. Broward

== Styles and schools ==
Jacksonville architects used many design styles and belonged to a variety of architectural schools. Below is a list of those styles and schools.

- American Four-Square
- Art Deco/Moderne
- Beaux-Arts
- Brutalism
- Chicago School (also known as Commercial Style)
- Classical Revival (also known as Neoclassical architecture)
- Colonial Revival
- Craftsman (also known as American Craftsman)
- Dutch Colonial
- Eastlake/Stick
- Egyptian Revival
- Gothic Revival
- International
- Mediterranean Revival
- Modern
- Prairie School
- Queen Anne
- Renaissance Revival (also known as Neo-Renaissance)
- Shotgun
- Spanish Revival (also known as Spanish Colonial Revival)
- Tudor Revival

== See also ==
- List of tallest buildings in Jacksonville
- National Register of Historic Places listings in Duval County, Florida
