= Blake (given name) =

- Pronunciation: /ˈbleɪk/
- Gender: Unisex
- Language: English

Origin
- Language: Old English
- Origin: From an English surname
- Derivation: Old English: blac or blaac
- Meaning: unknown
- Region of origin: England

Other names
- Related names: Blakey, Black

Blake is a unisex given name, which originated from Old English. Its derivation is uncertain; it could come from "blac", a nickname for someone who had dark hair or skin, or from "blaac", a nickname for someone with pale hair or skin.

== Notable men ==
- Blake Acres (born 1995), Australian rules footballer
- Blake Adams (born 1975), American golfer
- Blake Adams (baseball) (born 2000), American baseball player
- Blake Ahearn (born 1984), American basketball coach
- Blake Aldridge (born 1982), British diver
- Blake Allen (born 1988), American composer
- Blake Anderson (born 1984), American actor
- Blake Anderson (American football) (born 1969), American football coach
- Blake Andrews (born 1968), American photographer
- Blake Annen (born 1991), American football player
- Blake Archbold (born 2001), Australian footballer
- Blake Austin (born 1991), Australian rugby league footballer
- Blake Ayshford (born 1988), Australian rugby league footballer
- Blake Bailey (born 1963), American writer
- Blake Baker (born 1982), American football coach
- Blake Ball (1938–2006), Canadian ice hockey player
- Blake Barnett (born 1995), American football player
- Blake Bartlett (born 1993), Bahamian sprinter
- Blake Bashoff (born 1981), American actor
- Blake Baxter (born 1963), American musician
- Blake Beavan (born 1989), American baseball player
- Blake Beemer (born 1991), American baseball player
- Blake Bell (born 1991), American football player
- Blake Bellefeuille (born 1977), American ice hockey player
- Blake Berris (born 1984), American actor
- Blake Bjorklund (born 1985), American stock car racing driver
- Blake Blackburn (born 1992), Australian sports shooter
- Blake Bodily (born 1998), American soccer player
- Blake Bortles (born 1992), American football player
- Blake Aoki Borysewicz (born 1993), Japanese-American basketball player
- Blake Nelson Boyd (born 1970), American actor
- Blake Brandel (born 1997), American football player
- Blake Brettschneider (born 1989), American soccer player
- Blake Broadhurst (born 1985), Australian rules footballer
- Blake Brockermeyer (born 1973), American football player
- Blake Brockington (1996–2015), American activist
- Blake Broszus (born 2000), Canadian fencer
- Blake Burdette (born 1980), American rugby union footballer
- Blake Burke (born 2003), American baseball player
- Blake Burkhalter (born 2000), American baseball player
- Blake Butler (1924–1981), English actor
- Blake Butler (author) (born 1979), American writer
- Blake Caldwell (born 1984), American cyclist
- Blake Campbell (born 1982), Australian rules footballer
- Blake Caparello (born 1985), Australian boxer
- Blake Caracella (born 1977), Australian rules footballer
- Blake Carpenter (born 1991), American politician
- Blake Cashman (born 1996), American football player
- Blake Cederlind (born 1996), American baseball player
- Blake Chancey (born 1962), American record producer
- Blake Chanslor (1920–2009), American businessman
- Blake Charlton (born 1979), American author
- Blake Christensen (born 1995), American ice hockey player
- Blake Christian (born 1997), American professional wrestler
- Blake Clark (born 1946), American actor and comedian
- Blake Coburn (born 1995), New Zealand cricketer
- Blake Cochrane (born 1991), Australian Paralympic swimmer
- Blake Coleman (born 1991), American ice hockey player
- Blake Comeau (born 1986), Canadian ice hockey player
- Blake Converse (born 1965), American admiral
- Blake Cooper (born 2001), American actor
- Blake Corum (born 2000), American football player
- Blake Costanzo (born 1984), American football player
- Blake Countess (born 1993), American football player
- Blake Crouch (born 1978), American author
- Blake Cullen (born 2002), English cricketer
- Blake Curd (born 1967), American politician
- Blake Davis (disambiguation), multiple people
- Blake Dean (disambiguation), multiple people
- Blake Debassige (born 1956), Canadian artist
- Blake DeLong (born 1980), American actor
- Blake Dermott (born 1961), Canadian football player
- Blake Desjarlais (born 1993), Canadian politician
- Blake DeWitt (born 1985), American baseball player
- Blake F. Donaldson (1892–1966), American physician
- Blake Doriot, American politician
- Blake Doyle (born 1954), American baseball coach
- Blake Dunlop (born 1953), Canadian ice hockey player
- Blake Edwards (disambiguation), multiple people
- Blake Elliott (born 1981), American football player
- Blake Ellis (disambiguation), multiple people
- Blake Emmons, Canadian singer
- Blake Enever (born 1991), Australian rugby union footballer
- Blake Enzie (born 2001), Canadian skeleton racer
- Blake Evans (born 1980), Canadian ice hockey player
- Blake McIver Ewing (born 1985), American singer-songwriter
- Blake Ezor (born 1966), American football player
- Blake Farber (born 1985), American music director
- Blake Farenthold (1961–2025), American politician
- Blake Feese (born 1982), American race car driver
- Blake Ferguson (disambiguation), multiple people
- Blake Fiddler (born 2007), American ice hockey player
- Blake Filippi (born 1980), American politician
- Blake Fisher (born 2003), American football player
- Blake Fitzpatrick (born 1955), Canadian photographer
- Blake Fleming (born 1972), American drummer
- Blake Foster (born 1985), American actor and martial artist
- Blake Francis (born 1998), American basketball player
- Blake Frazier (born 2005), American football player
- Blake Freeland (born 2001), American football player
- Blake Frischknecht (born 1995), American soccer player
- Blake Gailen (born 1985), American-Israeli baseball player
- Blake Gaudry (born 1991), American gymnast
- Blake Geoffrion (born 1988), American ice hockey player
- Blake Gibbons (born 1961), American actor
- Blake Gibson (born 1995), New Zealand rugby union footballer
- Blake Gideon (born 1989), American football coach
- Blake Gillikin (born 1998), American football player
- Blake Goldring (born 1958), Canadian philanthropist
- Blake Gopnik (born 1963), American art critic
- Blake Gottesman (born 1980), American politician
- Blake Govers (born 1996), Australian field hockey player
- Blake Green (born 1986), Australian rugby league footballer
- Blake Griffin (born 1989), American basketball player
- Blake Grima (born 1984), Australian rules footballer
- Blake Grossman, British corporate executive
- Blake Grupe (born 1998), American football player
- Blake Hamilton (born 1994), American basketball player
- Blake Hance (born 1996), American football player
- Blake Hardwick (born 1997), Australian rules footballer
- Blake Harnage (born 1988), American songwriter
- Blake Harrell (born 1979), American football coach
- Blake Harrison (born 1985), British actor
- Blake Haubeil (born 1999), American football player
- Blake Hawksworth (born 1983), American baseball player
- Blake Heron (1982–2017), American actor
- Blake Alphonso Higgs (1915–1986), Bahamian singer
- Blake Hillman (born 1996), American ice hockey player
- Blake Hoffarber (born 1988), American basketball player
- Blake Hood (born 1985), American actor
- Blake Horton (born 1994), Australian footballer
- Blake Horvath, American football player
- Blake Hounshell (1978–2023), American journalist
- Blake Huffman (1902–1985), Canadian politician
- Blake Hunter (born 1934), American television producer
- Blake Hutcheson, Canadian corporate executive
- Blake Irving (born 1959), American corporate executive
- Blake Jackson (born 1994), American football player
- Blake Jarwin (born 1994), American football player
- Blake Jenner (born 1992), American actor
- Blake Johnson, American politician
- Blake Johnson (Arkansas politician), American politician
- Blake Jones (born 1997), American stock car racing driver
- Blake Judd (born 1982), American musician
- Blake Kessel (born 1989), American ice hockey player
- Blake Koch (born 1985), American stock car racing driver
- Blake Krikorian (1967–2016), American entrepreneur
- Blake Kyd (born 1988), South African rugby union footballer
- Blake Lalli (born 1983), American baseball player
- Blake Lawrie (born 1997), Australian rugby league footballer
- Blake Lazarus (born 1988), Greek rugby league footballer
- Blake Leary (born 1990), Australian rugby league footballer
- Blake Lee (born 1983), American actor
- Blake Leeper (born 1989), American Paralympic athlete
- Blake Leibel (born 1981), Canadian murderer
- Blake Leigh-Smith (born 1990), Australian motorcycle racer
- Blake Lewis (born 1981), American singer
- Blake Leyh (born 1962), American composer
- Blake Lizotte (born 1997), American ice hockey player
- Blake Lloyd, Canadian engineer
- Blake Lothian (born 2002), American stock car racing driver
- Blake Lynch (born 1997), American football player
- Blake MacDonald (born 1976), Canadian curler
- Blake Malone (born 2001), American soccer player
- Blake Marnell, American activist
- Blake Marshall (born 1965), Canadian football player
- Blake Martinez (born 1994), American football player
- Blake Masters (born 1986), American politician and author
- Blake Masters (screenwriter), American screenwriter
- Blake Mawson (born 1984), Canadian actor
- Blake Mazza (born 1998), American football player
- Blake McCormick (born 1964), American television producer
- Blake McDonald (born 1990), American racing driver
- Blake McGrath (born 1983), Canadian dancer
- Blake Michael (born 1996), American actor
- Blake Miguez (born 1981), American politician
- Blake Miller (disambiguation), multiple people
- Blake Mills (born 1986), American singer and songwriter
- Blake Mitchell (born 1984), American football player
- Blake Mitchell (baseball) (born 2004), American baseball player
- Blake Moore (born 1980), American politician
- Blake Moore (American football) (born 1958), American football player
- Blake Morant, American academic administrator
- Blake Morgan, American musician
- Blake Morrison (born 1950), British poet and author
- Blake Morton (born 1991), American curler
- Blake Mott (born 1996), Australian tennis player
- Blake Mueller (born 1982), Australian rugby league footballer
- Blake Murphy (born 2000), Irish Gaelic footballer
- Blake Mycoskie (born 1976), American entrepreneur
- Blake Neely (born 1969), American composer
- Blake Nelson (born 1965), American author
- Blake Paul Neubert (born 1981), American painter
- Blake T. Newton (1889–1977), American politician
- Blake Nikitaras (born 2000), Australian cricketer
- Blake Nill (born 1962), Canadian football player
- Blake Nordstrom (1960–2019), American businessman
- Blake Ochoa (born 1985), Spanish baseball player
- Blake O'Connor (born 2000), Australian musician
- Blake Oshiro (born 1970), American politician
- Blake Ostler (born 1957), American philosopher
- Blake Papsin (born 1959), Canadian otolaryngologist
- Blake Parker (born 1985), American football player
- Blake Parlett (born 1989), Canadian ice hockey player
- Blake Paulson, American politician
- Blake Pavey (born 2002), Australian comedian
- Blake Pedersen (born 1965), Canadian politician
- Blake Pelly (1907–1990), Australian politician
- Blake Percival, American whistleblower
- Blake Perkins (born 1996), American baseball player
- Blake Pieroni (born 1995), American swimmer
- Blake Pietila (born 1993), American ice hockey player
- Blake Pietila (ice hockey, born 2000) (born 2000), American ice hockey player
- Blake Pope (born 2003), American soccer player
- Blake Pouliot (born 1994), Canadian violinist
- Blake Powell (born 1991), American soccer player
- Blake Price (born 1974), Canadian sports broadcaster
- Blake Proehl (born 1999), American football player
- Blake Purchase (born 2004), American football player
- Blake Quick (born 2000), Australian cyclist
- Blake Reid, Canadian singer-songwriter
- Blake Ricciuto (born 1992), Australian footballer
- Blake Richards (born 1974), Canadian politician
- Blake Richardson (disambiguation), multiple people
- Blake Ritson (born 1978), English actor and director
- Blake Robbins (born 1965), American actor
- Blake Robison, American actor
- Blake Roman, American actor
- Blake Roney (born 1958), American entrepreneur
- Blake Ross (born 1985), American software engineer
- Blake Rutherford (born 1997), American baseball player
- Blake Sabol (born 1998), American baseball player
- Blake Sandberg (born 1975), American musician
- Blake L. Sartini (born 1959), American entrepreneur
- Blake Schilb (born 1983), American-Czech basketball player
- Blake Schlueter (born 1986), American football player
- Blake Scholl (born 1981), American tech entrepreneur
- Blake Schoupp, Australian rugby league footballer
- Blake Schraader (born 1994), South African cricketer
- Blake Schwarzenbach (born 1967), American musician
- Blake Sennett (born 1973), American musician
- Blake Shapen (born 2001), American football player
- Blake Shelton (born 1976), American singer
- Blake Shepard, American voice actor
- Blake Shields, American actor
- Blake Shinn (born 1987), Australian jockey
- Blake Signal (born 1982), New Zealand lawn bowler
- Blake Sims (born 1992), American football player
- Blake Skjellerup (born 1985), New Zealand speed skater
- Blake Slatkin (born 1997), American songwriter
- Blake Sloan (born 1975), American ice hockey player
- Blake Smith (born 1991), American soccer player
- Blake Smith (baseball) (born 1987), American baseball player
- Blake Snell (born 1992), American baseball player
- Blake Snyder (1957–2009), American screenwriter
- Blake Solly, Australian rugby executive
- Blake Speers (born 1997), Canadian ice hockey player
- Blake Spence (born 1975), American football player
- Blake Stein (born 1973), American baseball player
- Blake Stephen (born 1960), Canadian ice hockey player
- Blake Stephens, American politician
- Blake Stepp (born 1982), American basketball player
- Blake Stern (1917–1987), American tenor
- Blake Stowell, American corporate executive
- Blake Strode (born 1987), American lawyer
- Blake Swihart (born 1992), American baseball player
- Blake Taaffe (born 1999), Australian rugby league footballer
- Blake Taylor (born 1995), American baseball player
- Blake Tekotte (born 1987), American baseball player
- Blake Thompson (born 1993), Australian footballer
- Blake Thomson (born 1997), Australian cricketer
- Blake Tillery (born 1983), American politician
- Blake Trahan (born 1993), American baseball player
- Blake Treinen (born 1988), American baseball player
- Blake R. Van Leer (1893–1956), American academic administrator
- Blake Wayne Van Leer (1926–1997), American naval officer
- Blake Wagner (born 1988), American soccer coach
- Blake Wallace (born 1992), Australian rugby league footballer
- Blake Walston (born 2001), American baseball player
- Blake Ward (born 1956), Canadian sculptor
- Blake Watson (born 1999), American football player
- Blake Wescott, American musician
- Blake Wesley (disambiguation), multiple people
- Blake Wheeler (born 1986), American ice hockey player
- Blake White (born 2000), American-Jamaican footballer
- Blake Whiteheart (born 2000), American football player
- Blake Whitlatch (born 1955), American football player
- Blake Colburn Wilbur (1901–1974), American surgeon
- Blake Wilson (rugby league), Australian rugby league footballer
- Blake S. Wilson, American researcher
- Blake Williams (born 1985), Australian motocross racer
- Blake Williams (basketball) (1924–2003), American basketball player
- Blake Windred (born 1997), Australian golfer
- Blake Wingle (born 1960), American football player
- Blake Wise (born 1989), American singer
- Blake Wood (born 1985), American baseball player
- Blake Woodruff (born 1995), American actor
- Blake Workman (1908–1983), American football player
- Blake Worsley (born 1987), Canadian swimmer
- Blake Wotherspoon (born 1997), Australian field hockey player
- Blake Young (disambiguation), multiple people

== Notable women ==
- Blake Bolden (born 1991), American ice hockey player
- Blake Dietrick (born 1993), American professional basketball player
- Blake Lindsley (born 1973), American actress
- Blake Lively (born 1987), American actress
- Blake Russell (born 1975), American runner

== Fictional characters ==
- Blake Carrington, a character on the television series Dynasty
- Blake Marler, a character on the drama series Guiding Light
- Blake Tower, a character in the comic book series Marvel Comics
- Blake Belladonna, a character from anime series RWBY

== See also ==
- Blake (disambiguation)
- Blake (surname)
