= List of Merritt Centennials award winners and NHL draftees =

The Merritt Centennials are a junior "A" ice hockey team based in Merritt, British Columbia. This is a list of award winners on this team, and players who have subsequently joined the National Hockey League (NHL).

== Players Drafted Directly To The NHL ==
- Greg Agar (California Golden Seals - 10th round, 162nd overall in the 1975 NHL Entry Draft)
- Maco Balkovic (Chicago Blackhawks - 5th round, 110th overall in the 1991 NHL Entry Draft)
- Mike Hamilton (Atlanta Thrashers - 6th round, 175th overall in the 2003 NHL Entry Draft)
- Casey Pierro-Zabotel (Pittsburgh Penguins - 3rd round, 90th overall in the 2007 NHL Entry Draft)

== Alumni Drafted To The NHL From the WHL or Other Leagues ==
- Jeff Bandura - Portland Winter Hawks (Vancouver Canucks - 2nd round, 22nd overall in the 1977 NHL Entry Draft)
- Paul Mulvey - Portland Winter Hawks (Washington Capitals - 2nd round, 20th overall in the 1978 NHL Entry Draft)
- Kevin Willison - Billings Bighorns (St. Louis Blues - 5th round, 72nd overall in the 1978 NHL Entry Draft)
- Don Nachbaur - Billings Bighorns (Pittsburgh Penguins - 3rd round, 60th overall in the 1979 NHL Entry Draft)
- Pat Rabbitt - Billings Bighorns (St. Louis Blues - 8th round, 159th overall in the 1980 NHL Entry Draft)
- Troy Mick - Portland Winter Hawks (Pittsburgh Penguins - 7th round, 130th overall in the 1988 NHL Entry Draft)
- Cal McGowan - Kamloops Blazers (Minnesota North Stars - 4th round, 70th overall in the 1990 NHL Entry Draft)
- Paul Kruse - Kamloops Blazers (Calgary Flames - 4th round, 83rd overall in the 1990 NHL Entry Draft)
- Brent Thurston - Spokane Chiefs (Vancouver Canucks - 7th round, 139th overall in the 1991 NHL Entry Draft)
- Mike Josephson - Kamloops Blazers (Chicago Blackhawks - 8th round, 196th overall in the 1994 NHL Entry Draft)
- Tyler Willis - Swift Current Broncos (Vancouver Canucks - 8th round, 196th overall in the 1995 NHL Entry Draft)
- Mike Brown - Kamloops Blazers (Florida Panthers - 1st round, 20th overall in the 1997 NHL Entry Draft)

== Alumni Drafted To The NHL From NCAA ==
- Rob Polman-Tuin - Michigan Tech (Edmonton Oilers - 8th round, 153rd overall in the 1980 NHL Entry Draft)

== Award winners and trophies ==
BCHL Interior Conference Regular Season Champions

- 1977-78 season (101 points)
- 1978-79 season (98 points)

BCHL Regular Season Champions

- 1977-78 season (101 points)

BCHL Interior Conference Playoff Champions - Ryan Hadfield Trophy

- 2000-01 season

Mowat Cup - Provincial Champions

- 1977-78 season

Doyle Cup - BC/Alberta Champions

- 1977-78 season

Most Valuable Player

- Jason Tapp (1996–97)
- Shane Glover (1997–98)
- Brandon Wong (2005–06)
- Casey Pierro-Zabotel (2006–07)

Brett Hull Trophy - Individual Scoring Champion

- Fred Berry (136 points - 1973-74)
- Brandon Wong (116 points - 2005-06)

Bob Fenton Trophy - Most Sportsmanlike

- Darrel Zelinski (1973–74)
- Shane Glover (1997–98)
- Neil Stevenson-Moore (1999-00)
- Brandon Campos (2005–06)

Joe Tennant Memorial Trophy - Coach of the Year

- Joe Tennant (1977–78)
- Ed Beers (1988–89)
- Brian Barrett (1992–93)
- Al Glendinning (2005–06)

Bruce Allison Memorial Trophy - Rookie of the Year

- Fred Berry
- Mike Josephson (1991–92)
- Mike Ouellette (2000–01)

Goaltender of the Year - Lowest Goals Against Average

- Rob Polman-Tuin (1977–78)
- Rob Polman-Tuin (1978–79)
- Barry Rysz (1988–89)

Wally Forslund Memorial Trophy - Best Goaltending Duo

- Rob Polman-Tuin (1977–78)
- Rob Polman-Tuin (1978–79)
- Barry Rysz (1988–89)

== See also ==
- Merritt Centennials
