= Strong Medicine (disambiguation) =

Strong Medicine is an American television series.

Strong Medicine may also refer to:

- Strong Medicine (Donaldson book), a 1962 book by Blake F. Donaldson
- Strong Medicine (film), a 1981 drama directed by Richard Foreman
- Strong Medicine (novel), a 1984 novel by Arthur Hailey
