= Glenn Lazarus =

Australian rugby league footballer and coach, and politician

Glenn Lazarus OAM
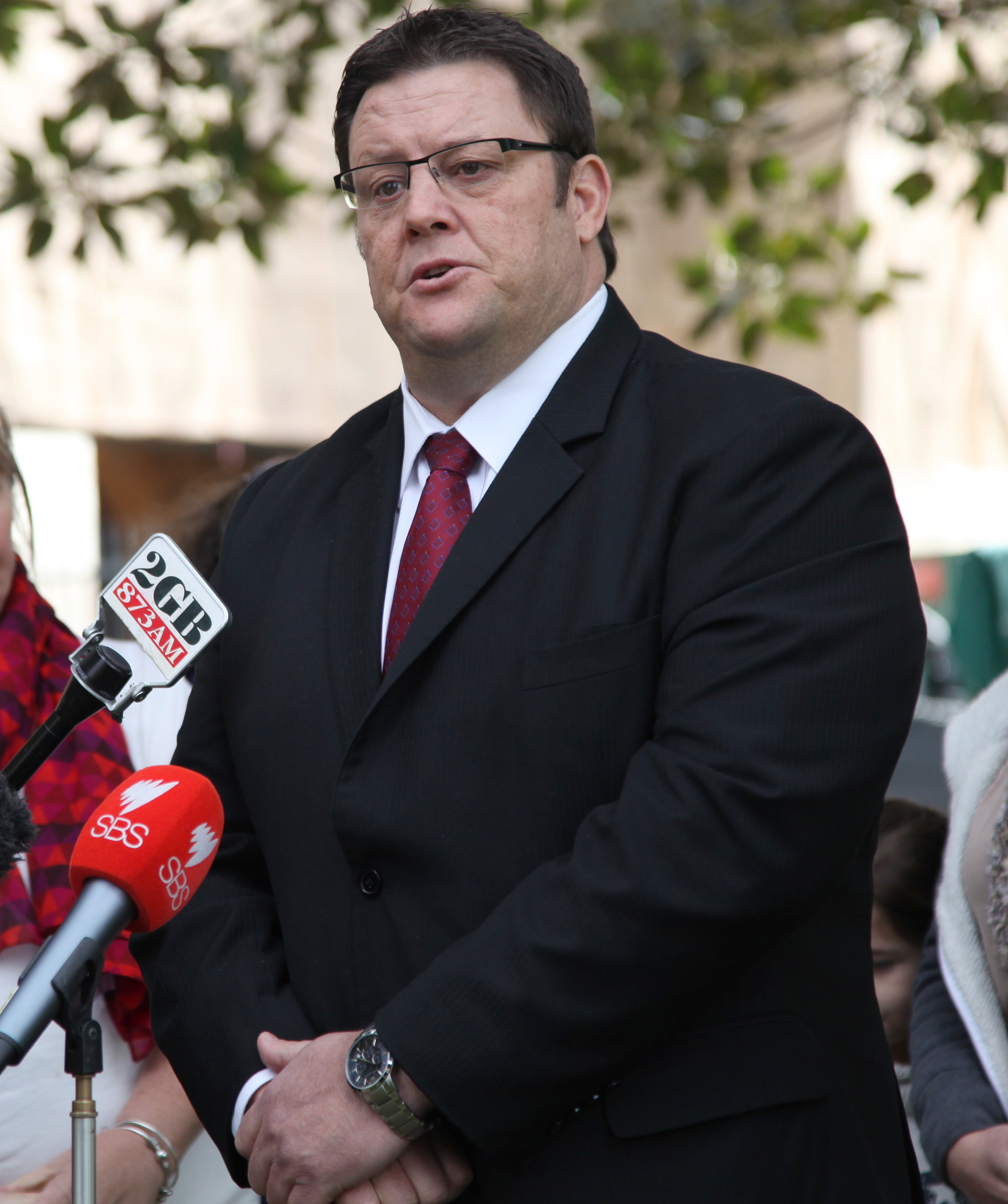
- Lazarus in 2015

Senator for Queensland
- In office 1 July 2014 – 2 July 2016
- Preceded by: Ron Boswell
- Succeeded by: Pauline Hanson

Leader of Palmer United in the Senate
- In office 16 October 2013 – 12 March 2015
- Deputy: Jacqui Lambie

Leader of the Glenn Lazarus Team
- In office 9 July 2015 – 14 July 2017
- Deputy: Kerrod Walters

Personal details
- Born: Glenn Patrick Lazarus; 11 December 1965 (age 60) Queanbeyan, New South Wales, Australia
- Party: Glenn Lazarus Team (2015–2017)
- Other political affiliations: Palmer United (2013–2015); Independent politician (2015)
- Spouse: Tess Sanders (m. 1990)
- Children: 3
- Education: Karabar High School
- Occupation: Rugby league footballer (National Rugby League)
- Profession: Athlete; Politician
- Website: http://glennlazarus.com.au
- Nickname: The Brick With Eyes
- Rugby league career

Playing information
- Height: 188 cm (6 ft 2 in)
- Weight: 115 kg (254 lb; 18 st 2 lb)
- Position: Prop
Club
Years	Team	Pld	T	G	FG	P
1987–91	Canberra Raiders	92	10	0	0	40
1992–97	Brisbane Broncos	118	9	0	0	36
1998–99	Melbourne Storm	44	2	1	0	10
	Total	254	21	1	0	86
Representative
Years	Team	Pld	T	G	FG	P
1988	President's XIII	1	1	0	0	0
1989–90	NSW City	2	0	0	0	0
1989–99	New South Wales	19	2	0	0	8
1990–99	Australia	21	1	0	0	4
1991–96	Country Origin	5	0	0	0	0
1997	New South Wales (SL)	3	0	0	0	0
1997	Australia (SL)	1	0	0	0	0
- Relatives: Blake Lazarus (nephew)

Glenn Patrick Lazarus OAM (born 11 December 1965) is an Australian former professional rugby league footballer, and a former Australian Senator. An Australian international and New South Wales State of Origin representative prop, Lazarus won premierships with the Canberra Raiders, Brisbane Broncos and Melbourne Storm, who he also captained. He is the only player in the history of the game to win grand finals with three separate clubs, with the grand final wins also being the first for each club. After his retirement from football he assisted several NRL clubs in a coaching capacity.

In the 2013 federal election, Lazarus was elected to the Australian Senate for the state of Queensland as the lead Queensland candidate for the Palmer United Party (PUP). He became PUP Senate leader at the commencement of his term on 1 July 2014. He quit PUP on 13 March 2015 citing issues with its leader Clive Palmer, and established his own political party, the Glenn Lazarus Team. He did not retain his seat in the 2016 federal election.

In 2021 Lazarus was inducted into the NSW Rugby League Hall of Fame. In June 2021, Lazarus was awarded the Medal of the Order of Australia in the 2021 Queen's Birthday Honours for "service to rugby league".

== Education ==
Lazarus was born in Queanbeyan, New South Wales. He attended Queanbeyan South Primary School and Karabar High School, Queanbeyan. He excelled at swimming and football, both Australian rules and especially rugby league.

== Rugby league career ==
Lazarus achieved a formidable reputation in prop forward position at club, state (NSW), and international levels. He is the only player in the history of the game to win premierships with three clubs: Canberra Raiders, Brisbane Broncos and Melbourne Storm. Lazarus was also named Players' Player for two consecutive Kangaroo Tours: 1990 and 1994. In addition, Lazarus scored the first rugby league try at the Melbourne Cricket Ground during a State of Origin game.

=== Canberra ===
Lazarus began his first-grade career with the Canberra Raiders in 1987, and was selected to make his debut for New South Wales in the 1989 State of Origin series. He played a starring role in the club's victory over the Balmain Tigers in the 1989 grand final. He travelled with the Raiders to England for the 1989 World Club Challenge, which was lost to Widnes.

Lazarus played in the Raiders' victory over the Penrith Panthers in the 1990 grand final. At the end of the 1990 NSWRL season, he went on the 1990 Kangaroo tour of Great Britain and France. He also played for Canberra in their grand final loss to Penrith in 1991.

=== Brisbane ===
In the summer preceding the 1992 season, Lazarus was recruited from Canberra by his former coach at the Raiders, Wayne Bennett and joined the Brisbane Broncos, with whom he played the largest portion of his career. During the 1992 Great Britain Lions tour of Australia and New Zealand, he helped Australia retain The Ashes. He played for the Broncos at prop forward in the 1992 grand final victory over the St. George Dragons, following which he travelled with the Broncos to England, where he played at prop forward in the 1992 World Club Challenge against British champions Wigan, helping Brisbane become the first NSWRL club to win the match in Britain. He then played for Australia at prop forward in the World Cup final victory over Great Britain at Wembley Stadium.

Lazarus played for the Broncos at prop forward in the 1993 grand final victory again over the St. George Dragons. This constituted a remarkable feat of playing in five consecutive grand finals. During the 1994 NSWRL season, Lazarus played at prop forward for defending premiers Brisbane when they hosted British champions Wigan for the 1994 World Club Challenge and lost. In 1996, he captained the Broncos in a game against the Penrith Panthers due to Allan Langer being injured. He was selected to go on the 1994 Kangaroo Tour, where he was voted the Players' Player of the tour. It was only a broken (dislocated) ankle suffered during a 1997 World Club Championship match that prevented Lazarus from playing in that year's Super League grand-final-winning Brisbane side.

=== Melbourne ===
Lazarus was recruited to the newly established Melbourne Storm by his former CEO (John Ribot) and teammate (Chris Johns) from the Broncos, both then responsible for setting up and managing the growth of new club in Melbourne. Lazarus commenced with the club in its inaugural year, 1998 and was named as the club's first captain and also given a newspaper column to write in The Herald Sun. He went on to lead the Melbourne Storm at prop forward in their 1999 grand final victory. Lazarus announced his retirement from the game with five premierships for three clubs (Canberra 1989–90, Brisbane 1992–93 and Melbourne 1999).

=== Post-playing ===
In 2000, Lazarus was awarded the Australian Sports Medal for his contribution to Australia's international standing in rugby league. He joined the coaching staff at the Canberra Raiders in 2000 and was set to coach the club's reserve grade team in 2001 before he was axed a week after being appointed.

In 2003, he was one of the first four former players inducted into the Broncos' official Hall of Fame. In 2005, the western grandstand of Olympic Park Stadium was named the Glenn Lazarus stand in his honour. Lazarus spent many years coaching junior rugby league in Brisbane. He also assisted the Canberra Raiders and Brisbane Broncos in an assistant coaching capacity.

In February 2008, Lazarus was named in the list of Australia's 100 Greatest Players (1908–2007), which was commissioned by the NRL and ARL to celebrate the code's centenary year in Australia. Lazarus has been 612 ABC Brisbane Breakfast rugby league tipster since 2008. In 2008 New South Wales announced their rugby league team of the century, naming Lazarus at prop.

At the end of the 2008 Queensland Cup season, Lazarus, who served as assistant coach at the Ipswich Jets club under the departing Kevin Walters, was named as head coach of the club from the 2009 season. Lazarus stepped down to focus on business interests in 2010.

Lazarus continues to undertake motivational speaking engagements and corporate appearances. He has also worked as a volunteer and ambassador for various not for profit organisations including the RSPCA and SES.

== Political career ==
Lazarus was selected to head the Palmer United Party (PUP) Senate ticket in Queensland at the 2013 federal election and was elected on a 9.89 percent primary vote. He got to the required 14.3 percent quota from a favourable preferential tally from group voting tickets. His term as a PUP Senator commenced on 1 July 2014 and he became PUP Senate leader.

He announced his resignation from PUP through Facebook on 13 March 2015 and became an independent Senator. He wrote: "I have a different view of team work. Given this, I felt it best that I resign from the party and pursue my senate role as an independent senator."

=== Glenn Lazarus Team ===
Glenn Lazarus Team
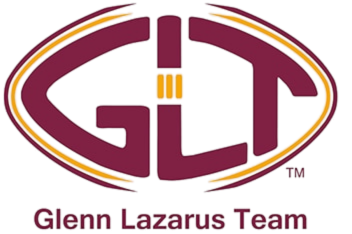
- Abbreviation: GLT
- Leader: Glenn Lazarus
- Founded: 14 May 2015
- Registered: 9 July 2015
- Dissolved: 14 July 2017
- Split from: Palmer United
- Senate: 1 / 76 (2015–2016

In May 2015, Lazarus announced his intention to form his own party. The party, Glenn Lazarus Team, was registered on 9 July 2015. Lazarus and the Glenn Lazarus Team were unsuccessful in the 2016 federal election and did not secure any seats in the Parliament. As this was a double dissolution election, Lazarus' Senate term ended on 2 July 2016. The party was voluntarily deregistered on 14 July 2017.

== Personal life ==
Lazarus is married and has three children.
