= St. Paul's by the Sea =

St. Paul's by the Sea may refer to:

- St. Paul's by-the-Sea Episcopal Church in Jacksonville Beach, Florida
- St. Paul's by-the-sea Protestant Episcopal Church in Ocean City, Maryland
