= Blake Ellis =

Blake Ellis may refer to:

- Blake Ellis (architect), American architect
- Blake Ellis (tennis) (born 1999), Australian tennis player
