= Blake Young =

Blake Young may refer to:

- Kobe Tai (born 1972), former pornographic actress and adult model, sometimes credited as Blake Young
- Blake Young (motorcycle racer) (born 1987), American motorcycle racer
- Blake Young fka Young Chozen American Hip hop Artist
