= Merritt Centennials =

Canadian junior ice hockey team

- City: Merritt, British Columbia
- League: BCHL (1961-2024); KIJHL (2024-2026); BCHC (2026-present)
- Conference: Okanagan/Shuswap
- Division: Bill Ohlhausen
- Founded: 1961
- Home arena: Nicola Valley Memorial Arena
- Colours: Red, black, white
- President: Ken Carruthers
- General manager: Brad Anstey
- Head coach: Wes McLeod
- Website: merrittcentennials.com

Franchise history
- 1961–1964: Kamloops Rockets
- 1964–1967: Kamloops Kraft Kings
- 1967–1973: Kamloops Rockets
- 1973: White Rock Centennials
- 1973–1985: Merritt Centennials
- 1985–1987: Merritt Warriors
- 1987–2024: Merritt Centennials (BCHL)
- 2024-2026: Merritt Centennials (KIJHL)
- 2026-present: Merritt Centennials (BCHC)

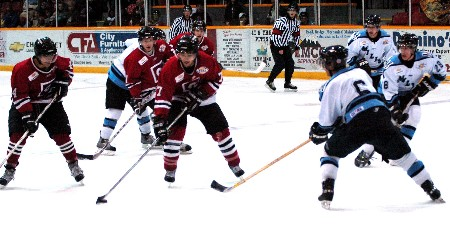
2007 regular season game against the Quesnel Millionaires

The Merritt Centennials are a Junior 'A' ice hockey team based in Merritt, British Columbia. They are set to compete in the Interior Division in the British Columbia Hockey Conference (BCHC) beginning in the 2026–27 season after playing in the Kootenay International Junior Hockey League (KIJHL). They play their home games at the Nicola Valley Memorial Arena. The franchise was established in Kamloops in 1961 as part of the British Columbia Hockey League (BCHL) and moved to White Rock in 1973 when the WCHL's Vancouver Nats moved to Kamloops and became the Chiefs. The Centennials settled in Merritt midway through the 1973–74 season. In 2024, the team announced they would be leaving the BCHL to join the KIJHL.

The Centennials have once finished with the best record in the BCHL. They won the Mowat Cup and BC/Alberta Junior "A" Championship in 1978.

The Cents, as the team is known, were the longest continuously run franchise in the BCHL before leaving. Eleven former Centennials players have gone on to play in the National Hockey League.

== History ==
=== 1973–1985 ===
After 12 seasons as the Kamloops Rockets, one of the inaugural teams in the Okanagan-Mainline Junior A Hockey League and became the British Columbia Junior Hockey League (BCJHL) in 1967, the Rockets relocated to White Rock, British Columbia in 1973 to make room for the Kamloops Chiefs of the major junior Western Canada Hockey League. The Rockets then became known as the White Rock Centennials.

1973–74 BCJHL Rookie of the Year Fred Berry

The Centennials started the 1973–74 season in White Rock but finished it in Merritt, where they finished the season last in the Interior Division with a record of 20–42–2. Season highlights included Fred Berry becoming the first Cents player to lead the BCJHL in scoring with 136 points. As of 2008, that total still stood as a team record for points in a season. Berry and Darrel Zelinski also finished 1–2 overall in BCJHL scoring. The Centennials first playoff ended in the first round in six games to the eventual BCJHL champion Kelowna Buckaroos. At the postseason awards, Berry took home rookie of the year while Zelinski was named most sportsmanlike player.

The following season, the Cents improved in the overall standings but finished last in the Interior Division at 26–38–2. Zelinski continued his torrid scoring pace, finishing fifth in league scoring with 50 goals, 61 assists, and 111 points in 66 games. In the playoffs, Merritt once again faced Kelowna in the first round and lost in seven games.

By the 1975–76 season, the BCJHL had realigned into a single table and removed the division format. The Centennials finished above .500 for the first time in five years by two games, and were fourth in the realigned BCJHL. Zelinski again finished near the top of the scoring race with 50 goals, 69 assists, and 119 points in 66 games. Merritt defeated the Langley Lords in six games in the opening round of the playoffs. In the second round, the Nanaimo Clippers, who had finished second overall in the regular season, eliminated the Cents in seven games.

In the 1975–76 season, forward Greg Agar became the franchise's first player chosen in the NHL entry draft, going in the 10th round, 162nd overall to the California Golden Seals. Agar also is the first player chosen directly from a BCJHL team.

The Centennials tied for last place in the league with the Kamloops Braves in the 1976–77 season after losing players like Darrel Zelinski. The team saw the addition of players like Ed Beers and Gary Sirkia along with coach Joe Tennant.

For the 1977–78 season, the team added players like Ken Stroud, Rob Polman-Tuin, and Kelly Ferner, and had continued development of Ed Beers and Gary Sirkia. The Cents finished at top of the BCJHL standings with a record of 50–15–1 for a franchise record 101 points. As of 2007, that total stood as the fourth-most ever points accumulated by one team in a season in league history. The team also had 489 goals scored in the season, led by six different players with 90 points or more. Stroud, Ferner, Beers, and Sirkia all finished in the league's top 15 in scoring, each with more than 111 points, while Pat Rabbitt and Blake Stephen earned 93 points each. Merritt also had four 50-plus goal scorers in Stroud, Ferner, Beers, and Rabbitt. As of 2007, Stroud's 86 assists that season still stood as a team record.

The Centennials did not participate in the 1978 BCJHL playoffs as they were chosen by the league to represent them in the Centennial Cup Junior "A" playoffs. In the national championships, the Centennials first faced the Pacific Junior A Hockey League's Richmond Sockeyes for the Mowat Cup provincial championship. Merritt swept the best of five series 3–0 and advanced to the BC/Alberta Junior "A" Championship against the Alberta Junior Hockey League's Calgary Canucks, where the Centennials defeated them in six games. The Cents then lost the Abbott Cup championship against the Saskatchewan Junior Hockey League's Prince Albert Raiders four games to one. The team won several post-season awards such as Joe Tennant with coach of the year and Rob Pulman-Tuin with the goaltender of the year and best goaltending duo awards.

The 1978–79 season had the Centennials second overall in the league, with 98 points in 62 games. Polman-Tuin lead all goaltenders in goals against average for the second straight year at 2.54 and won his second straight goaltender and goaltending duo of the year awards. The Cents defeated Kelowna in the Interior Division semifinals 4-games-to-2 before being upset by Kamloops, who had finished the regular season 24 points behind the first place Merritt, in the Interior Division finals 4-games-to-2.

The Centennials finished last in the division in the 1979–80 season with a record of 20–38–2 and second to last overall in the league. The season was also the first time since moving to Merritt that the team failed to make the playoffs. The downward trend lasted for several seasons, with the team consistently finishing near the bottom of the league. In the 1982–83 season, team set a BCJHL record for fewest goals scored in a 56-game season with 166. In the 1983–84 season, the team set another record for most goals allowed in a season with 543, an average of 9.05 against per game, even while forward Brent Demerais set a single-season team record with 66 goals.

The team improved in the 1984–85 season and the Centennials ended the season third in the Interior Division with a record of 24–27–1. The team was led by the trio of Pat Ryan, Kevin Cheveldave, and Mark Bogoslowski, each of whom placed among the top 15 league scorers. The Cents also returned to the postseason where they beat Vernon in a seven-game series in the division semifinals before being swept in the division finals by a first place Penticton squad that had lost only five games all season

=== Merritt Warriors: 1985–1987 ===
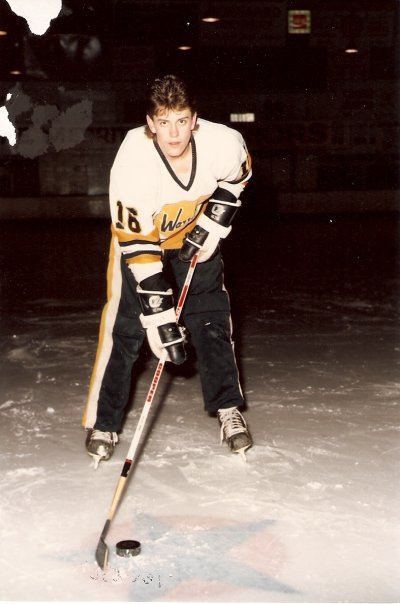
Former player Bill Birks shown as a member of the Merritt Warriors

Prior to the 1985–86 season, team owners tried to appeal to the First Nations population in the Nicola Valley and also identify more with the Merritt minor hockey association. As a result, the team colours became white, black, and yellow and the team name was changed from the Centennials to the Warriors. The team improved on their record from the previous season, going 27–23–2, but were once again swept by the Knights in four games. The following season, the Warriors won just 10 games, but still qualified for the playoffs and were again swept in the first round.

=== 1987–2000 ===
The 1987–88 season began with the team changing its name back to the Centennials and their red, black, and white colour scheme. After a record of 25–27–0, the Cents were swept from the playoffs for the third-straight time in the first round. The team improved the following 1988–89 season with nine more wins. Goaltender Barry Rysz finished second overall in goals-against-average at 4.39 and was awarded the Best Goaltender of the Year, while head coach Ed Beers was recognized with the Coach of the Year. In the playoffs, the Cents defeated Salmon Arm in the division semifinals in five games before being swept in four games by Vernon Lakers.

At the 1991 NHL entry draft, the Chicago Blackhawks made Cents defenceman Maco Balkovec the highest player ever drafted directly from the team in the fifth round, 110th overall.

After missing the playoffs in 1992 for the first time in seven seasons, the Cents earned 14 more wins in the 1992–93 season. Brian Barrett, who took over as coach of the team midway through the season, was named coach of the year for the Interior Conference. The Centennials then struggled in the 1993–94 season and traded several players, including Bill Muckalt and Joe Rybar to the Kelowna Spartans, midway through the season. The Centennials missed the playoffs while Kelowna Spartans would go all the way to the Centennial Cup championship, losing to the Olds Grizzlys. At the 1994 NHL entry draft, Muckalt was chosen in the ninth round, 221st overall by the Vancouver Canucks. Former Centennial and 1991–92 BCJHL rookie of the year Mike Josephson, who had moved on to the Western Hockey League's Kamloops Blazers, was chosen 196th overall by Chicago.

The Centennials did not return to the playoffs until after the 1995–96 season. Merritt eliminated the South Surrey Eagles 2–0 in the best-of-three series and advanced to the league quarterfinals, where it faced the Chilliwack Chiefs. The Chiefs defeated Merritt in five games. The team spent the next several seasons finishing in the middle of the standings and eliminated early in the playoffs.

The Centennials "Maple Leaf" logo used from 1996 to 2007

In the 1997 NHL entry draft, 1994–95 player Mike Brown became the first former Centennial to be drafted in the first round when Florida chose him 20th overall from the WHL's Red Deer Rebels. In 1997, Cents goaltender Jason Tapp was awarded the Interior Division's most valuable player and in 1998, Shane Glove won the Interior Division's most valuable player and most sportsmanlike player.

Merritt finished the 1990s with its best season in eleven years. Placing fourth in the Interior Division for the third straight year, the team was led by the goaltending of Jamie Holden who finished fifth in the league with a 3.45 goals against average. In the playoffs, Merritt upset first place Penticton in six games in the first round and met the Vernon Vipers in the Interior Conference finals and fell in game seven. The Cents were represented at the postseason awards with forward Neil Stevenson-Moore sharing the Interior Conference's most sportsmanlike award with Prince George's Mike Lalonde.

=== 2000–2009 ===
In the 2000–01 season, the Cents finished record of 30–21–9 and 69 points for second place in the division. The Cents swept the Prince George Spruce Kings in the opening round before facing the Penticton Panthers, who had finished the season first in the division, 29 points ahead of the Centennials. The first place Panthers were then upset by Merritt with the Cents outscoring Penticton 16 to 7 in a four-game sweep and earning the franchise's first appearance in the Fred Page Cup finals. In the finals, the Victoria Salsa took the championship. Forward Mike Ouelette won Rookie of the Year for the Interior Conference.

After struggling early in the 2001–02 season, the Centennials hired Al Glendinning as head coach in January 2002 taking over from Red Deer-native Kevin McKay. Glendinning led the Cents to the playoffs, but were swept 4–0 in the first round.

At the 2003 NHL entry draft, Mike Hamilton became just the third player in franchise history to be drafted directly to the National Hockey League when the Atlanta Thrashers chose him in the 6th round, 175th overall. The Cents also acquired future professional players Bryan Leitch, Casey Pierro-Zabotel, and a league-leading scorer in Brandon Wong.

After several more middle-of-pack seasons, including a below .500 season in 2004–05, the 2005–06 team had a finish with a record of 33–18–1–8. This season included a stretch that saw the team lose one regulation game in their final twenty games and the 75 points were Merritt's best season in 27 years. In the first round of playoffs, the Centennials defeated the Trail Smoke Eaters in five games. The Cents faced the first place Penticton Vees in the second round and were then swept in four games. Following the season, Brandon Wong was awarded the Interior Conference most valuable player and BCHL top scorer, Brandon Campos won Interior Conference most sportsmanlike player, and Al Glendinning won Interior Conference coach of the year.

The Centennials had another middle place finish in 2006–07, but was led by Casey Pierro-Zabotel and Wade MacLeod, who finished third and fourth respectively in league scoring. Zabotel posted 116 points in 55 games while MacLeod earned 105 points in 60 games. Zabotel also represented the Centennials on the gold medal winning team at the inaugural World Junior A Challenge. The Cents lost in the seventh game of the opening round against the Trail Smoke Eaters. After the season, Zabotel won Interior Conference most valuable player, marking the first time that a Centennials player had claimed that award in back to back seasons. At the 2007 NHL entry draft, Zabotel became the fourth player in franchise history to be drafted directly to the NHL when the Pittsburgh Penguins chose him in the 3rd round, 80th overall, and the highest player ever drafted directly from the Centennials.

The Cents fell to 13–38–1–8 in 2007–08 and last overall in the league. The season marked the first time in 12 seasons, and first time in seven seasons under Al Glendinning, that Merritt missed the playoffs. The following season, the Centennials missed the playoffs once more and Glendinning was fired in 2009.

=== 2009–2024 ===
Joey Bouchard was slated to become bench boss for the 2009–10 season, but would relinquish his duties prior to the start of the season, before Dylan and Tyler Forsyth took over as general manager and coaches. Former Centennial and Merritt born-and-raised Luke Pierce joined as an assistant coach, but took over as head coach following the Forsyths' being let go from their duties early in the season, finishing with a record of 22–26–2–0.

The 2011-12 season had the Centennials finish with a winning record of 34–18–6–2. The team made it to the second round of the playoffs before being eliminated by the Vees. The Centennials then were eliminated in the first round of the playoffs for the following three seasons and Pierce was hired by the Western Hockey League's Kootenay Ice.

Pierce was replaced by assistant coach Joe Martin in 2015.

=== 2024 Withdrawal from BCHL ===
On 31 March 2024, it was announced that the Merritt Centennials would be ceasing BCHL operations at the end of the 2023-24 BCHL season. It was further announced that an expansion team would join the KIJHL under new ownership beginning in the 2024–25 season as part of the Bill Ohlhausen Division. According to the announcement, the team would keep the same name and continue to play out of the Nicola Valley Memorial Arena under a 5-year lease.

=== Joining the BCHC (2026) ===
On April 20, 2026, the Centennials were named as one of 22 teams joining the BCHC, leaving the KIJHL with the remaining 12 teams.

== Team colours and mascot ==
=== Logo ===
The old "Maple Leaf" style jerseys used from 1996 to 2007

The Cents logo is a red square with a black hockey stick and puck forming the letter "C". The logo lies on a field of white in the middle of the chest on both uniforms.

In 1973–74, the original logo featured a white square with a black hockey stick and puck in it forming the letter "C". The logo laid on a field of red in the middle of the chest. This was prior to having home and away uniforms. In the late 1970s, the logo changed to a red square with a black hockey stick and puck forming the letter "C" with the words "Merritt" above the logo and "Centennials" below the logo. On the home jerseys, the logo laid on a field of white, while on the away jerseys, the logo laid on a field of red.

When the team briefly changed its name to the Warriors for the 1985–87 seasons, the logo changed to a yellow oval with the word "Warriors" written in black cursive font. Following the 1986–87 season, the team name reverted to the Centennials and the team went back to using the square logo.

Prior to the 1995–96 season, the logo changed to a red maple leaf with the word "Merritt" in small print on the right side of the leaf's stem and the word "Centennials" in larger print directly underneath the maple leaf, overlapping the bottom three lines in the maple leaf's "swoosh".

As part of the Cents 35th anniversary in Merritt, the team's board of directors opted to return to the original square logo, beginning with the 2007–08 season.

=== Uniforms ===
The current team colours are red, black and white, and they can be seen on both the home and road uniforms. The home jersey is dominantly white in colour. There are two black stripes and one red stripe across each arm and across the waist. The road uniform is red in colour with a similar design, except that there are two black stripes and two white stripes across the waist and across each arm.

== Season-by-season results ==
Note: GP = Games played, W = Wins, L = Losses, T = Ties, OTL = Overtime Losses, D = Defaults, Pts = Points, GF = Goals for, GA = Goals against

Records as of February 17, 2024.

Season by season as members of the Kootenay International Junior Hockey League
Season	GP	W	L	OTL	SOL	GF	GA	Points	Finish	Playoffs
2024–25	44	26	13	3	2	146	122	57	3rd of 6 Ohlhausen Div; 3rd of 11 O/S Conf; 7th of 21 KIJHL	Lost Div. Semi 1-4 (Grizzlies)

=== Playoffs ===
Records as of March 1, 2025.

Season	1st Round	2nd Round	3rd Round	Finals
2024–25	L, 1–4, Revelstoke	—	—	—

== Players ==
=== NHL alumni ===
Eleven former Centennials players have gone on to play in the National Hockey League. The first was Fred Berry, who played three games with the Detroit Red Wings in 1976–77.

- Jeff Bandura
- Ed Beers
- Fred Berry
- Mike Brown
- Ron Flockhart
- Link Gaetz
- Alan Kerr
- Paul Kruse
- Bill Muckalt
- Paul Mulvey
- Don Nachbaur

Four Centennials players have also been selected directly from the BCHL to the National Hockey League (NHL), with the most recent is Casey Pierro-Zabotel, who went in the third round, 80th overall in the 2007 NHL entry draft to the Pittsburgh Penguins. Other Centennials that have been drafted directly to the NHL include Greg Agar, Maco Balkovec, and Mike Hamilton, although none have played in an NHL game as of 2019. Agar was also the first active BCJHL player chosen in an NHL draft.

== Head coaches ==
- Gord MacBeth, 1973–74
- Fred Switzer, 1974–75
- Don Prowal/Gary Swanson, 1975–76
- Gary Swanson, 1976–77
- Joe Tennant, 1977–1979
- Brian Barrett, 1979–1982
- Len McNamara, 1982–83
- Enio Saccialotto/Roddy Rodgers/Chuck Tapp, 1983–84
- Chuck Tapp, 1984–1986
- Brian Barrett, 1986–87
- Ed Beers, 1987–1989
- John "Butch" Tent, 1989–1991
- Tim Clayden/Shawn Dineen, 1991–92
- Scott Farrell/Brian Barrett, 1992–93
- Wes Phillips/Ryan Stewart, 1993–94
- Dave Shyiak, 1994–95
- Bryant Perrier, 1995–1997
- Ed Beers/Brian Barrett, 1997–98
- Mike Vandekamp, 1998–2001
- Kevin MacKay/Al Glendinning, 2001–02
- Al Glendinning, 2002–2009
- Dylan Forsythe, 2009
- Luke Pierce, 2009–2015
- Joe Martin, 2015–2019
- Barry Wolff, 2019
- Derek Sweet-Coulter, 2019-2021
- Dave Chyzowski, 2021-22
- Curtis Toneff, 2022-2024
- Wes McLeod 2024-present

== Franchise records ==
=== Career scoring leaders ===
These are the top-ten point-scorers in franchise history. Figures are updated after each completed BCHL regular season.

Note: Pos = Position; GP = Games played; G = Goals; A = Assists; Pts = Points; P/G = Points per game * = still active with the team

Updated at completion of 2007–08 season

Player	Pos	GP	G	A	Pts	P/G
Darrel Zelinski	F	196	160	187	347	1.8
Al Rushton	F	165	127	142	269	1.6
Casey Pierro-Zabotel	C	190	92	118	210	1.1
Bill Muckalt	RW	157	103	105	208	1.3
Guy Prince	F	160	67	111	178	1.1
Brent Demerais	F	103	83	74	157	1.5
Gary Sirkia	F	123	52	103	155	1.3
Wade MacLeod	F	101	65	81	146	1.4
Ken Stroud	F	66	54	86	140	2.1
Kelly Ferner	LW	57	56	82	138	1.4

=== Individual ===
- Most goals in a season: Brent Demerais, 66 (1983–84)
- Most assists in a season: Ken Stroud, 83 (1977–78)
- Most points in a season: Ken Stroud, 140 (54g, 86a) (1977–78)
- Most penalty minutes in a season : Robert Pfoh, 376 (1982–83)
- Most points in a season by a defenseman: Maco Balkovec, 78 (14g, 64a) (1990–91)

=== Team ===
- Most points in a season: 101 (1977–78)
- Most wins in a season: 50 (1977–78)
- Most goals-for in a season: 489 (1977–78)
- Fewest goals-for in a season: 166 (1982–83)
- Fewest goals-against: 176 (1978–79)
- Most goals-against: 543 (1983–84)

== BCHL records ==
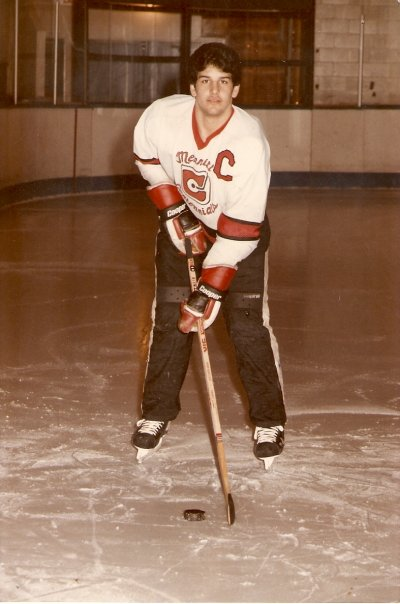
Former Cents player John "Butch" Tent. He holds the BCHL record for most seasons played. (Tied with Powell River's Heath Dennison)

- Most shutouts, one season: Rob Polman-Tuin, 5 (1978–79) tied with Surrey's Chris Peck (1996–97), Penticton's David Rathjen (1999–2000), Nanaimo's David LeNeveu (2000–01), and Cowichan Valley's Tim Boron (2001–02)
- Most assists in a single game: Ken Stroud, 9 (1977) tied with Vernon's Ernie Gare (1971) and Vernon's Duane Dennis (1989)
- Most total points in a single game: Ken Stroud, 12 (1977) tied with Penticton's Joe Murphy (1985)
- Fastest two goals in a game: Carl Poeschek, 6 seconds (1979) tied with Kelowna's Bill Haynes (1975) and Langley's Russ Wilderman (1975)
- Most seasons played with one team: John "Butch" Tent, 5 tied with Powell River's Heath Dennison.
- Most seasons played in the BCHL: John "Butch" Tent, 5 tied with Richard Sloan, Heath Dennison, Clint Black, Pat Hodgins, Brent Berry, Rob Millikin, Sjon Wynia, and Brian Henderson.
- Most goals allowed in a season: 543 (1983–84 season)

== Awards and honours ==
The Merritt Centennials have captured numerous awards during the franchise's history. Centennials players have been named the BCHL Interior Conference most valuable player four times in the past twelve seasons. Forward Brandon Wong won the Interior Conference most valuable player award in 2005–06 along with being the winner of the Brett Hull trophy as BCHL Individual Scoring Champion. As a team, the Centennials have won the Interior Conference twice and once been the regular season champion of the BCHL.

BCHL Regular Season Champions

- 1977–78

BCHL Interior Conference Regular Season Champions

- 1977–78, 1978–79

Ryan Hadfield Trophy
BCHL Interior Conference Playoff Champions

- 2000–01

BCHL Interior Conference Most Valuable Player

- Jason Tapp (1996–97)
- Shane Glover (1997–98)
- Brandon Wong (2005–06)
- Casey Pierro-Zabotel (2006–07)

Brett Hull Trophy
BCHL Top Scorer

- Fred Berry (136 points – 1973–74)
- Brandon Wong (116 points – 2005–06)

Bob Fenton Trophy
BCHL Interior Conference Most Sportsmanlike Player

- Darrel Zelinski (1973–74)
- Shane Glover (1997–98)
- Neil Stevenson-Moore (1999-00)
- Brandon Campos (2005–06)

Bruce Allison Memorial Trophy
BCHL Interior Conference Rookie of the Year

- Fred Berry (1973–74)
- Mike Josephson (1991–92)
- Mike Ouellette (2000–01)

Goaltender of the Year
Lowest Goals Against Average – Regular Season

- Rob Polman-Tuin (1977–78)
- Rob Polman-Tuin (1978–79)
- Barry Rysz (1988–89)

Joe Tennant Award
BCHL Interior Conference Coach of the Year

- Joe Tennant (1977–78)
- Ed Beers (1988–89)
- Brian Barrett (1992–93)
- Al Glendinning (2005–06)

Distinguished Volunteer Award
BCHL Interior Conference Best Volunteer

- Rusty Brewer (1990–91)

== See also ==
- List of ice hockey teams in British Columbia
- List of Merritt Centennials award winners and NHL draftees

Preceded by Richmond Sockeyes	Mowat Cup Champions; 1978	Succeeded by Richmond Sockeyes
Preceded by Richmond Sockeyes	Alberta/BC Junior "A" Championship Champions; 1978	Succeeded by Spruce Grove Mets
Preceded by Kelowna Buckaroos	BCHL Regular Season Champions; 1977–78	Succeeded by Bellingham Blazers
Preceded by Kelowna Buckaroos	BCHL Interior Conference Regular Season Champions; 1977–78 and 1978–79	Succeeded by Penticton Knights
Preceded by Vernon Vipers	BCHL Interior Conference Playoff Champions; 2001	Succeeded by Vernon Vipers
