= Paul Kruse =

Canadian ice hockey player

- Born: March 15, 1970 (age 56) Merritt, British Columbia, Canada
- Height: 6 ft 0 in (183 cm)
- Weight: 202 lb (92 kg; 14 st 6 lb)
- Position: Left wing
- Shot: Left
- Played for: Calgary Flames; New York Islanders; Buffalo Sabres; San Jose Sharks; Sheffield Steelers; Belfast Giants; EHC Linz
- NHL draft: 83rd overall, 1990; Calgary Flames
- Playing career: 1990–2004

Paul Johannes Kruse (born March 15, 1970) is a Canadian former ice hockey left wing. He played in the National Hockey League. with the Calgary Flames, New York Islanders, Buffalo Sabres, and San Jose Sharks between 1991 and 2001. He was drafted in the fourth round, 83rd overall, by the Calgary Flames in the 1990 NHL entry draft.

== Playing career ==
After playing three seasons in the Western Hockey League with the Moose Jaw Warriors and Kamloops Blazers, Kruse joined the International Hockey League's Salt Lake Golden Eagles. After splitting three seasons between the Golden Eagles and the Flames, he joined the Flames full-time in the 1993–94 season.

During the 1996–97 season, Kruse was acquired by the New York Islanders. At the trade deadline of the 1997–98 season, he was traded, along with Jason Holland, to the Buffalo Sabres for Jason Dawe. Kruse was a member of the Buffalo Sabres team which went to the Stanley Cup Finals in the 1998–99 season, appearing in ten playoff games during the run.

Kruse's last NHL appearance came when he dressed for one game for the 2000–01 San Jose Sharks. He went to Europe after the season, playing two years in the United Kingdom's British Ice Hockey Superleague for the Sheffield Steelers and the Belfast Giants and one more year playing in Austria playing for EHC Black Wings Linz before retiring.

Kruse is married with two daughters.

== Career statistics ==
=== Regular season and playoffs ===
			Regular season					Playoffs
Season	Team	League	GP	G	A	Pts	PIM	GP	G	A	Pts	PIM
1986–87	Merritt Warriors	BCJHL	35	8	15	23	120	—	—	—	—	—
1987–88	Merritt Centennials	BCJHL	44	12	32	44	223	4	1	4	5	18
1987–88	Moose Jaw Warriors	WHL	1	0	0	0	0	—	—	—	—	—
1988–89	Kamloops Blazers	WHL	68	8	15	23	209	16	0	0	0	35
1989–90	Kamloops Blazers	WHL	67	22	23	45	291	17	3	5	8	79
1989–90	Kamloops Blazers	M-Cup	—	—	—	—	—	3	1	2	3	8
1990–91	Calgary Flames	NHL	1	0	0	0	7	—	—	—	—	—
1990–91	Salt Lake Golden Eagles	IHL	83	24	20	44	313	—	—	—	—	—
1991–92	Calgary Flames	NHL	16	3	1	4	65	—	—	—	—	—
1991–92	Salt Lake Golden Eagles	IHL	57	14	15	29	267	—	—	—	—	—
1992–93	Calgary Flames	NHL	27	2	3	5	41	—	—	—	—	—
1992–93	Salt Lake Golden Eagles	IHL	35	1	4	5	206	—	—	—	—	—
1993–94	Calgary Flames	NHL	68	3	8	11	185	7	0	0	0	14
1994–95	Calgary Flames	NHL	45	11	5	16	141	7	4	2	6	10
1995–96	Calgary Flames	NHL	75	3	12	15	145	3	0	0	0	4
1996–97	Calgary Flames	NHL	14	2	0	2	30	—	—	—	—	—
1996–97	New York Islanders	NHL	48	4	2	6	11	—	—	—	—	—
1997–98	New York Islanders	NHL	62	1	7	8	138	—	—	—	—	—
1997–98	Buffalo Sabres	NHL	12	1	1	2	49	1	1	0	1	4
1998–99	Buffalo Sabres	NHL	43	3	0	3	114	10	0	0	0	4
1999–00	Buffalo Sabres	NHL	11	0	0	0	43	—	—	—	—	—
1999–00	Utah Grizzlies	IHL	44	10	13	23	71	5	0	3	3	28
2000–01	Chicago Wolves	IHL	71	8	12	20	180	16	2	3	5	22
2000–01	San Jose Sharks	NHL	1	0	0	0	5	—	—	—	—	—
2001–02	Sheffield Steelers	BISL	44	12	16	28	152	8	2	2	4	20
2002–03	Belfast Giants	BISL	25	5	13	18	92	18	3	9	12	53
2003–04	EHC Linz	EBEL	16	4	3	7	64	3	0	0	0	2
NHL totals			423	38	33	71	974	28	5	2	7	36
