= Blake Lazarus =

Greece international rugby league footballer

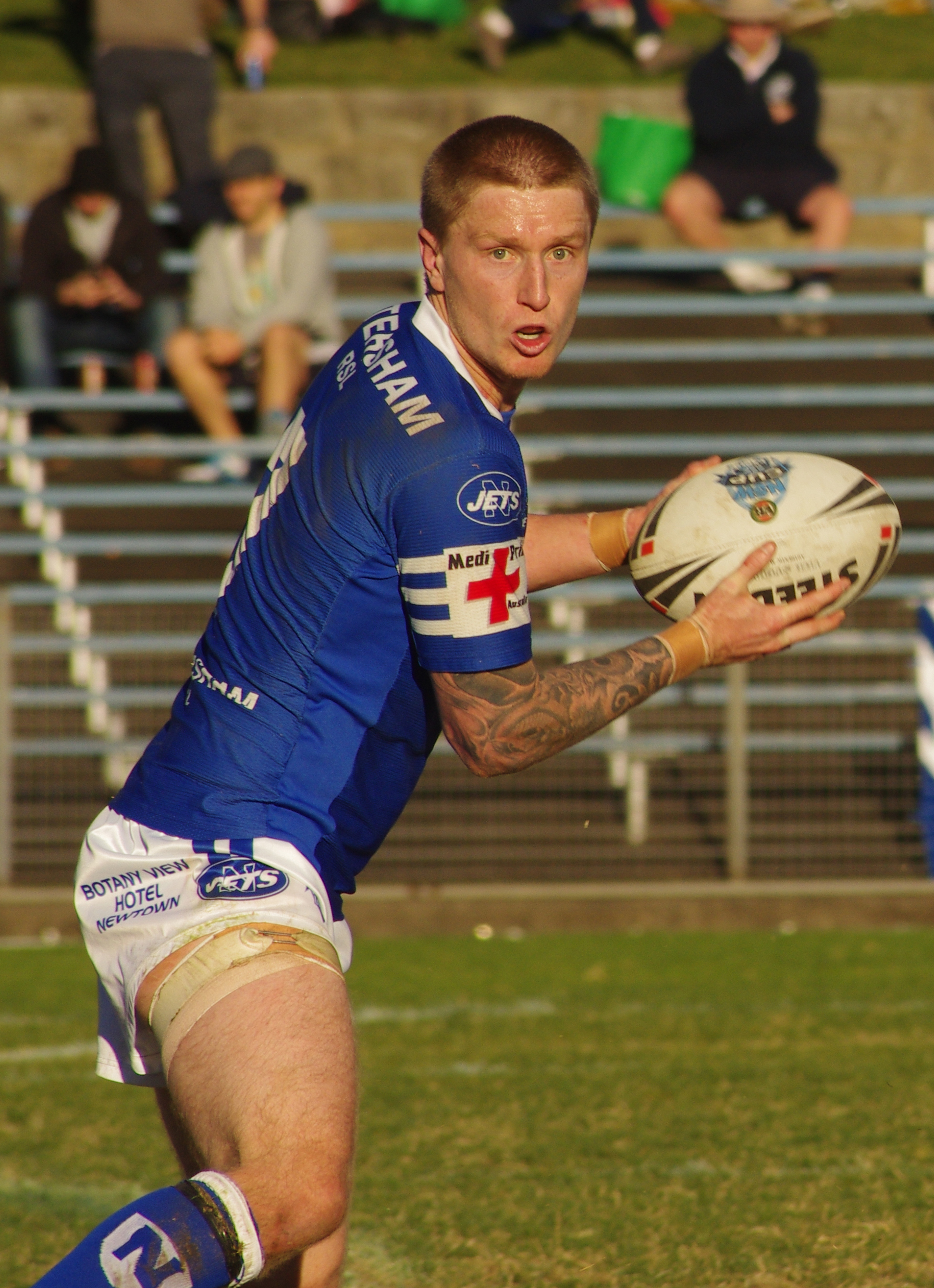

Personal information
- Full name: Blake Lazarus
- Born: 9 June 1988 (age 38) New South Wales, Australia
- Height: 185 cm (6 ft 1 in)
- Weight: 90 kg (14 st 2 lb)

Playing information
- Position: Five-eighth, Halfback, Fullback
Club
| Years | Team | Pld | T | G | FG | P |
|---|---|---|---|---|---|---|
| 2009–10 | Wests Tigers | 2 | 0 | 2 | 0 | 4 |
| 2010–11 | Avignon Bisons | 12 | 3 | 7 | 0 | 0 |
| 2011–2012 | Newtown Jets | 23 | 7 | 23 | 1 | 0 |
| | Total | 37 | 10 | 32 | 1 | 4 |
Representative
| Years | Team | Pld | T | G | FG | P |
| 2012–14 | Greece | 2 | 4 | 10 | 0 | 36 |
- Source: As of 30 January 2019
- Relatives: Glenn Lazarus (uncle)

Blake Lazarus (born 9 June 1988) indigenous Australian, a former professional rugby league footballer who played for the Wests Tigers in the NRL competition, later expanding his career playing in the French elite competition for Avignon Bisons. In 2011, he returned to Australia continuing his career with the Sydney Roosters and Newtown.

== Background ==
Lazarus was born in New South Wales, Australia. He is of Greek, Irish and Australian Aboriginal heritage.

== Playing career ==
Lazarus played junior football with Eagle Vale St Andrews. His uncle is five time rugby league Grand Final winner Glenn Lazarus.

After injuries to Tim Moltzen and Robert Lui, Lazarus was chosen to make his debut in round six of the 2010 NRL season. He had one more appearance for the season against the Penrith Panthers.

Having been released by Wests Tigers, Lazarus joined the Avignon Bisons in France at the end of the 2010 season.

In 2011 Lazarus played for Newtown in the NSW Cup and also represented the Greek national side against Vanuatu.

Lazarus again represented Greece in 2014, scoring 3 tries and kicking 8 goals from 9 attempts in a game against Thailand.
