= Blake Ferguson =

Blake Ferguson may refer to:

- Blake Ferguson (rugby league) (born 1990)
- Blake Ferguson (American football) (born 1997)
