= Karabar High School =

School in New South Wales, Australia

Location
- Donald Road, Karabar, Queanbeyan, Southern Tablelands region, New South Wales; Australia; 35°21′55″S 149°13′30″E

Information
- Type: Government-funded co-educational dual modality partially academically selective and comprehensive secondary day school
- Motto: Life is for living
- Established: 1977; 49 years ago
- School district: Queanbeyan; Rural South and West
- Educational authority: New South Wales Department of Education
- Principal: Ann-Marie Shannon
- Teaching staff: 166.1 FTE (2018)
- Years: 7–12
- Enrolment: 1,142 (2018)
- Campus type: Regional
- Slogan: Quality education – Quality future
- Website: karabar-h.schools.nsw.gov.au

Karabar High School is a government-funded co-educational dual modality partially academically selective and comprehensive secondary day school, located on Donald Road, Karabar, a suburb of Queanbeyan in the Southern Tablelands region of New South Wales, Australia. The principal is Ann-Marie Shannon.

== See also ==
- List of government schools in New South Wales: G–P
- List of selective high schools in New South Wales
- Selective school (New South Wales)
- Education in Australia
