= Blake Ellis (architect) =

American architect

Blake Ellis is an American architect. His work includes St. Paul's by-the-Sea Episcopal Church in Jacksonville Beach, Florida. He is based in Valdosta, Georgia.

According to the architect's website he has also designed campuses for the Technical College System of Georgia, two new colleges for the Georgia Board of Regents and a Master Development plan for Valdosta State University. He studied at Georgia Institute of Technology.

== Other works ==
Honey Creek Chapel

- Francis and Diane Lott House (1969) in Douglas, Georgia Constructed using redwood.
- Camp, conference center and Episcopal Conference Center Chapel in Camden County, Georgia at Honey Creek including the Chapel of Our Savior.
- West Hall administration building rear addition(?) and renovation at Valdosta State College, North Patterson Street at Georgia Avenue. A modernist addition to the Spanish Colonial Revival was done in the 1960s and later remodeled.
