= Blake Davis =

Blake Davis or Davies may refer to:

- Blake Davis (baseball) (born 1983), American baseball player
- Blake Davis (actor) (born 1991), Australian actor
- Blake Davies, musician in Turbowolf and Captain Everything!
