= Blake Dean =

Blake Dean may refer to:

- Blake Dean (baseball) (born 1988), college baseball coach
- Blake Dean (Home and Away), fictional character on Australian soap opera Home and Away
- Blake Dean (cricketer) (born 1987), captain coach of Queanbeyan District Cricket Club and player with ACT Comets and Sydney Thunder
- Blake Dean, a location within the upper course of Hebden Water in West Yorkshire, England
