= Jeff Bandura =

Canadian ice hockey player (born 1957)

- Born: April 2, 1957 (age 69) White Rock, British Columbia, Canada
- Height: 6 ft 1 in (185 cm)
- Weight: 195 lb (88 kg; 13 st 13 lb)
- Position: Defence
- Shot: Right
- Played for: New York Rangers; HC Fribourg-Gotteron
- NHL draft: 22nd overall, 1977; Vancouver Canucks
- Playing career: 1977–1984

Jeff Mitchell Joseph Bandura (born April 2, 1957) is a Canadian former professional ice hockey player. He played 2 games in the National Hockey League with the New York Rangers during the 1980–81 season. The rest of his career, which lasted from 1977 to 1985, was mainly spent in the minor leagues.

Born in White Rock, British Columbia, Bandura played junior hockey in the Western Canada Hockey League for the Calgary Centennials, Edmonton Oil Kings and Portland Winter Hawks.

He was drafted in the second round, 22nd overall by the Vancouver Canucks in the 1977 NHL entry draft. He played in the Canucks organization in the minors (Central Hockey League) with the Tulsa Oilers and Dallas Black Hawks before being traded along with Jere Gillis to the New York Rangers. After the trade, he spent the majority of his time with the Rangers affiliate the New Haven Nighthawks of the American Hockey League before being called up by the New York Rangers in the 1980–81 season, where he would play 2 games.

He then played one season for HC Fribourg-Gotteron in Switzerland. After returning from Europe, Bandura played one more season in the AHL for the Maine Mariners; the Mariners went on to win the Calder Cup. He retired from hockey after that season.

== Career statistics ==
=== Regular season and playoffs ===
			Regular season					Playoffs
Season	Team	League	GP	G	A	Pts	PIM	GP	G	A	Pts	PIM
1973–74	Merritt Centennials	BCJHL	40	1	14	15	35	—	—	—	—	—
1974–75	The Pass Red Devils	AJHL	4	0	0	0	26	—	—	—	—	—
1974–75	Calgary Centennials	WCHL	66	3	12	15	157	—	—	—	—	—
1975–76	Calgary Centennials	WCHL	32	4	16	20	59	—	—	—	—	—
1975–76	Edmonton Oil Kings	WCHL	35	6	21	27	64	5	0	3	3	14
1976–77	Portland Winter Hawks	WCHL	71	3	28	31	224	10	4	3	7	18
1977–78	Tulsa Oilers	CHL	60	2	18	20	88	7	0	1	1	14
1978–79	Dallas Black Hawks	CHL	65	4	25	29	169	9	0	1	1	28
1979–80	Dallas Black Hawks	CHL	80	4	26	30	114	—	—	—	—	—
1980–81	Dallas Black Hawks	CHL	11	0	2	2	15	—	—	—	—	—
1980–81	New York Rangers	NHL	2	0	1	1	0	—	—	—	—	—
1980–81	New Haven Nighthawks	AHL	55	1	14	15	131	4	0	0	0	13
1981–82	HC Fribourg-Gottéron	NLA	7	0	0	0	11	—	—	—	—	—
1982–83	Spokane Chiefs	WIHL	—	5	25	30	30	—	—	—	—	—
1983–84	Maine Mariners	AHL	9	1	0	1	6	1	0	0	0	0
1983–84	Spokane Chiefs	WIHL	—	—	—	—	—	—	—	—	—	—
1984–85	Spokane Chiefs	WIHL	38	8	23	31	41	—	—	—	—	—
CHL totals			216	10	71	81	386	16	0	2	2	42
NHL totals			2	0	1	1	0	—	—	—	—	—
