= St. Paul's by-the-Sea Episcopal Church =

Episcopal church in Jacksonville Beach, Florida

Coordinates: 30.299490°N 81.395932°W

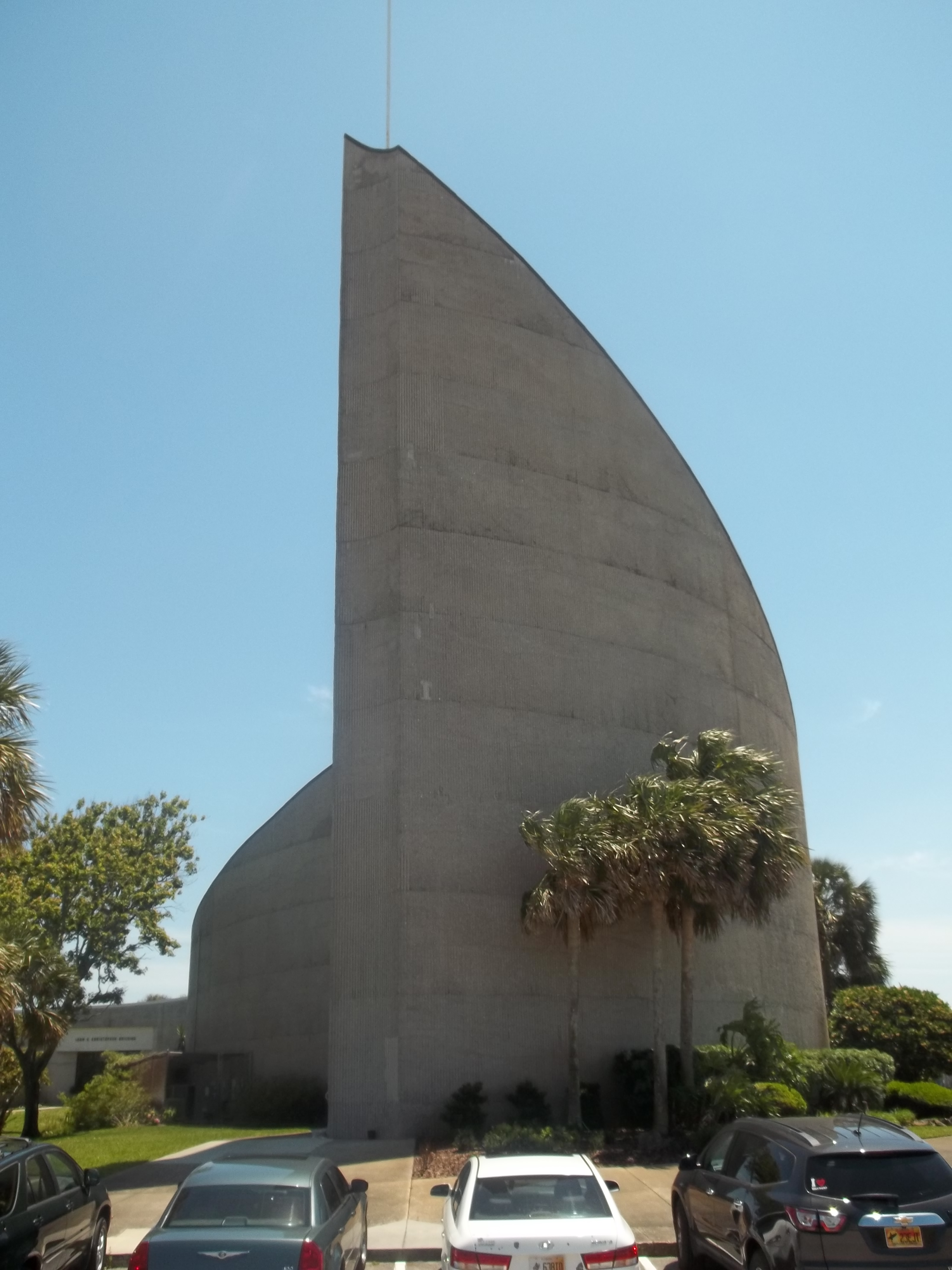

St. Paul's by-the-Sea Episcopal Church is an Episcopal church in Jacksonville Beach, Florida. The first church to be established in the Jacksonville Beaches, it dates to 1887 with the construction of its original building. The current building was dedicated in 1967.

== Early history ==
In 1886, a small group of locals in Pablo Beach, Florida (now Jacksonville Beach) and regular guests of the Murray Hall Hotel joined to host Episcopal services. Service was held at the hotel, as there were no churches in the Jacksonville Beaches area at the time. The following year, congregants raised $800 to build their own chapel, which was designed by architect Robert Sands Schuyler. The Atlantic Railroad donated land on the corner of 2nd Avenue South and 2nd Street.

The chapel sat empty in 1902 and 1923. Year-round services began in 1925, and St. Pauls-by-the-Sea became its own parish in 1940. As the congregation grew, the church made plans for a new, larger building. It acquired land at 11th Avenue and 5th Street North and moved the original chapel building there in 1953. It was renovated and expanded a few years later. In 1967 the congregation dedicated its current building, a substantially larger modern structure. Three years later, the congregation sold the original chapel to Central Christian Church at the Beaches, now Beaches Chapel. Its new owners relocated the structure to their property in nearby Neptune Beach. Beaches Chapel later built its own larger church, and used the small chapel primarily for Sunday services, weddings, and for the students at its school. In 2011, Beaches Chapel sold the building for $1 to the Beaches Area Historical Society, who moved it once more to Beaches Museum & History Park on Beach Boulevard, near its original location.

== Current building ==
The modern church was dedicated in 1967. It was designed in the modern style by Blake Ellis and is made of coquina concrete. On April 18, 2012, the American Institute of Architects' Florida Chapter included the building in its list of "Florida Architecture: 100 Years. 100 Places".
