= Blake Edwards (disambiguation) =

Blake Edwards (1922–2010) was an American film director.

Blake Edwards may also refer to:

- Blake Edwards (cricketer) (born 1999), Australian cricketer
- Blake Edwards (water polo) (born 1992), Australian water polo player
