= Blake Wesley =

Blake Wesley may refer to:

- Blake Wesley (basketball), (born 2003) American basketball player
- Blake Wesley (ice hockey), (born 1959) Canadian ice hockey player

== See also ==
- Wesley Blake, (born 1987) American professional wrestler
