= Blake Sandberg =

American painter and musician

- Born: 1975 (age 50–51); Austin, Texas
- Education: University of Texas at Austin
- Known for: Painting, Writing, Music

Blake Sandberg is an artist, musician, filmmaker, skateboarder, company owner, and writer who lives and works in New York City. Sandberg is known for his painting and drawing; as well as his post-punk band Aliens. Sandberg also founded and runs a skateboard and printed goods company called Severed Leg Productions.

== Education ==
Sandberg studied at the University of Texas at Austin, awarded an arts scholarship from the school. He later decided to leave college and move to NYC. While enrolled, Sandberg worked independently with artists Peter Saul, Richard Jordan, and Michael Ray Charles.

== Art career ==
In 1997, Sandberg moved to New York City to engage with and experience the Lower East Side art scene. He first set up his studio in a small storefront on Avenue B and began making work in and inspired by New York City. In 1999, Sandberg was included in his first major group exhibition at Frederieke Taylor Fine Art, showing alongside some of Sandberg's childhood heroes, including Phillip Guston, Andy Warhol, and de Kooning.

In January 2001, Sandberg moved into a larger studio on Broadway in Lower Manhattan and expanded the scale of his work. Beginning a new series that would be exhibited at Exit Art in 2001 to critical review. In late 2003, Sandberg received his first solo exhibition in New York City at Aaron Payne Fine Art in Williamsburg, Brooklyn. His work has been exhibited in Chelsea galleries, Michael Steinberg, Guided By Invoices, and Vanessa Buia Gallery, among others. Since the 2000s, Sandberg has exhibited internationally, exhibiting work in shows in Austin, Marfa, San Francisco, London, and Tokyo.

=== September 11th related illnesses ===
Living in close proximity to the World Trade Center on 9/11/2001, Sandberg was exposure to dust and fumes from Ground Zero of the September 11 attacks. Sandberg has been hospitalized and treated for a series of related chronic illnesses in the years since the attack.

== Aliens (band) ==
Sandberg is the guitarist, songwriter, and front man of the NYC based band Aliens. Aliens released their album "Head First" in 2007.
