= Fred Berry (ice hockey) =

Canadian ice hockey player (born 1956)

- Born: March 26, 1956 (age 70) Stony Plain, Alberta, Canada
- Height: 5 ft 10 in (178 cm)
- Weight: 170 lb (77 kg; 12 st 2 lb)
- Position: Centre
- Shot: Left
- Played for: Detroit Red Wings
- NHL draft: 40th overall, 1976; Detroit Red Wings
- WHA draft: 69th overall, 1976; Winnipeg Jets
- Playing career: 1976–1987

Frederick Allan Berry (born March 26, 1956) is a Canadian former professional ice hockey forward, who played three games in the National Hockey League (NHL) with the Detroit Red Wings during the 1976–77 season. The rest of his career, which lasted from 1976 to 1987, was spent in various minor leagues.

== Playing career ==
During his final year in the British Columbia Junior Hockey League, he scored 60 goals and 136 points in 60 games to lead the league. The following year, he moved up to the New Westminster Bruins of the Western Canada Junior Hockey League, and had 75 points in 69 games. The Bruins won the league title and advanced to the 1975 Memorial Cup where they lost to the Toronto Marlboros, the Ontario champions. Berry returned for a second season in New Westminster and scored 59 goals and 146 points. Once again, the Bruins took the WCJHL title, advancing to the 1976 Memorial Cup, this time losing to the Hamilton Fincups.

He was drafted in the third round, 40th overall by the Detroit Red Wings in the 1976 NHL entry draft. He played one season in the minors before getting called up by Detroit in the 1976–77 season, playing three games. He went on to play nine seasons in the minors after that.

== After hockey ==
Berry and his brother Bill founded Hockey Haven, a hockey retailer in Milwaukee. For many years, Berry was also associated with collegiate hockey in Wisconsin, coaching the Marquette University Warriors from 1987 to 1991. He was named head coach and general manager of the Milwaukee Power, a Tier III junior team in the North American 3 Hockey League, for the 2018–19 season.

== Career statistics ==
=== Regular season and playoffs ===
			Regular season					Playoffs
Season	Team	League	GP	G	A	Pts	PIM	GP	G	A	Pts	PIM
1973–74	Merritt Centennials	BCJHL	60	60	76	136	91	—	—	—	—	—
1973–74	Victoria Cougars	WCHL	1	0	1	1	0	—	—	—	—	—
1974–75	New Westminster Bruins	WCHL	69	32	43	75	120	18	12	12	24	38
1974–75	New Westminster Bruins	M-Cup	—	—	—	—	—	3	2	1	3	2
1975–76	New Westminster Bruins	WCHL	72	59	87	146	164	17	6	15	21	45
1975–76	New Westminster Bruins	M-Cup	—	—	—	—	—	4	0	3	3	0
1976–77	Detroit Red Wings	NHL	3	0	0	0	0	—	—	—	—	—
1976–77	Kalamazoo Wings	IHL	66	17	42	59	146	10	9	8	17	12
1977–78	Kansas City Red Wings	CHL	65	11	14	25	79	—	—	—	—	—
1978–79	Kalamazoo Wings	IHL	19	7	11	18	43	—	—	—	—	—
1978–79	Toledo Goaldiggers	IHL	49	27	43	70	91	—	—	—	—	—
1979–80	Hampton Aces	EHL	6	3	4	7	4	—	—	—	—	—
1979–80	Toledo Goaldiggers	IHL	33	11	29	40	33	—	—	—	—	—
1979–80	Milwaukee Admirals	IHL	26	9	22	31	29	2	1	1	2	0
1980–81	Milwaukee Admirals	IHL	72	35	71	106	73	7	5	7	12	4
1981–82	Milwaukee Admirals	IHL	76	47	65	112	114	5	4	4	8	6
1982–83	Milwaukee Admirals	IHL	71	47	74	121	57	10	3	5	8	0
1983–84	Milwaukee Admirals	IHL	82	38	58	96	50	4	3	1	4	2
1985–86	Milwaukee Admirals	IHL	81	31	58	89	51	5	3	2	5	2
1986–87	Milwaukee Admirals	IHL	57	18	31	49	50	—	—	—	—	—
IHL totals			632	287	504	791	737	43	28	28	56	26
NHL totals			3	0	0	0	0	—	—	—	—	—
