= Blake Ostler =

American lawyer

Blake Thomas Ostler (born 1957) is an American philosopher, theologian, and lawyer. He has written numerous articles on the topics of Mormon theology, philosophy, and thought.

== Background ==
Blake Thomas Ostler was born in 1957 in Murray, Utah. Ostler served a mission to Milan, Italy from 1977 to 1979. He later married Christine Edwards, whom he met while attending Brigham Young University. They have five children. Ostler received his BA in philosophy and BS in psychobiology in 1981 from Brigham Young University (BYU). He received his JD as a William Leary Scholar from the University of Utah in 1985. In each of his these degrees, Ostler graduated with honors. He is a practicing attorney specializing in education law, commercial litigation; franchise law and litigation, construction law and litigation, property and development law and litigation educational law, employment law and intellectual property. Ostler and his wife completed a Spanish-speaking mission in Utah where he taught English and gave legal advice to immigrants and non-English speakers.

== Mormon studies works ==
Ostler has published widely on Mormon philosophy in journals such as Religious Studies, International Journal for the Philosophy of Religion, Dialogue: A Journal of Mormon Thought, BYU Studies and the FARMS Review of Books. He is best known for his award-winning and groundbreaking four-volume series entitled Exploring Mormon Thought. The first volume, The Attributes of God, addresses the attributes of God from a Mormon perspective. Ostler argues that God cannot know what acts a person will freely do in the future. The first volume also expounds a Mormon Christology or theory of Christ as both fully human and fully divine at once. Ostler also assesses the attributes of divine power, divine mutability, divine pathos, divine temporality and human and divine nature.

The second volume, The Love of God and the Problems of Theism, addresses Mormon soteriology or theory of salvation. Ostler addresses whether God's love can be properly called "unconditional" in Mormon thought. He also addresses the problems of petitionary prayer. He develops a theory of ethics based upon a modified agape theory of ethics. He then addresses and critiques salvation by grace in classic Christian thought. He develops a theory of human nature and sin departing from self-deception theory. He elucidates and exegetes several scriptural passages based upon self-deception as the underlying cause of the human condition of alienation. Ostler elucidates a "Compassion Theory of Atonement" and describes how free acceptance of Christ's gracious gift of divine light leads to interpersonal healing and overcoming alienation. He presents two arguments that creation ex nihilo (out of nothing) is logically incompatible with both libertarian and compatibilist views of free will. Finally he argues that Joseph Smith's "King Follett Discourse," given 7 April 1844, has been misunderstood. He argues that Joseph Smith did not teach that God the Father became divine after not having been divine for an eternity prior to experiencing a mortality; but that Joseph Smith quoted John 5:19 to show that the Son did what the Father had done before him. Because Christ was fully divine before becoming mortal, it follows (he argues) that the Father must also have been fully divine before becoming mortal.

The third volume, Of God and Gods, addresses the relation of the Israelite council of gods, the early Christian view of the Godhead and the angel of Yahweh, and finally analyzes the Mormon view of the Godhead as a social trinity that reconciles these views. Ostler relies on critical biblical scholarship to argue that what Joseph Smith's critics took to be theological innovations contrary to scripture are in fact a faithful understanding of the Hebrew scriptures. He elucidates the Near Eastern background of the biblical beliefs in a council of gods overseen by a Most High God. He also critiques the most prominent views of the Latin and Social Trinity.

The fourth volume, God's Plan to Heal Evil, (published in 2019) addresses the problem of evil. Ostler presents three different approaches to theodicy (explanation of why God allows evil) based upon three very different views of God's relation to the natural universe in Mormon thought—a naturalistic theodicy, a process theodicy, and a Plan of Atonement theodicy.

Ostler has published a short volume (Fire on the Horizon: A Meditation on the Endowment and Love of Atonement) relying on continental philosophers in the existential tradition Martin Buber and Søren Kierkegaard to discuss what he calls "revelatory discourse" and present an ethic of such discourse.

Ostler plans a fifth volume in the Exploring Mormon Thought series to address spiritual knowledge and epistemology as well as the mind-body problem and consciousness within the Latter-day Saint tradition. Ostler adopts an epistemology of "supra-verbal" experiential knowledge and subjectivity (following the Danish philosopher Søren Kiekegaard and the German philosopher Immanuel Kant) to elucidate a theory of religious knowledge. It also addresses the problems arising from competing claims among various world religions. Ostler argues that Mormonism adopts a form of soteriological and epistemological inclusivism as a solution to the latter problem. Regarding consciousness, Ostler accepts a form of non-dualist emergentism consistent with Latter-day Saint commitments regarding free-will and God’s power.

Ostler accepts the Book of Mormon as an actual historical account, but as edited and expanded in light of Joseph Smith's vocabulary and capacity for expression within his world view. He argues that it is a modern expansion of an ancient document. Because Ostler adopts the expansion theory, he affirms that the Book of Mormon was translated through the gift of God and reflects a revelation of the content of an ancient source though we have access only to its modern translation.

Ostler currently practices law in Salt Lake City.

== Publications ==
- Exploring Mormon Thought: The Attributes of God (October 1, 2001) ISBN 1-58958-003-6
- Exploring Mormon Thought: The Problems With Theism And the Love of God (March 2006) ISBN 1-58958-095-8
- Exploring Mormon Thought: Of God and Gods (April 2008) ISBN 1-58958-107-5
- Fire on the Horizon: A Meditation on the Endowment and Love of Atonement (2013) ISBN 978-1-58958-553-9 (paperback)
- Exploring Mormon Thought: God's Plan to Heal Evil (2020) ISBN 978-1-58958-191-3 (hardback)
