= Blake Lloyd =

Blake Lloyd is an electrical engineer with Iris Power Engineering in Mississauga, Ontario. Lloyd was named a Fellow of the Institute of Electrical and Electronics Engineers (IEEE) in 2016 for his contributions to the development of non-intrusive diagnostics for electrical motors and generators.
