= Blake O'Connor =

- Born: 5 October 2000 (age 24) Windsor, New South Wales, Australia
- Genres: Country
- Occupation: Singer-songwriter
- Instruments: Vocals; guitar (bass, electric, acoustic); harmonica
- Years active: 2017–present
- Website: www.blakeoconnormusic.com

Blake O'Connor is an Australian country music singer and songwriter. He released his debut studio album Everything I Feel in July 2019, which landed at #1 ARIA Australian Country Charts and peaked at number 31 on the all genres international ARIA Albums Chart.

== Biography ==
=== 2000–2015: Early life and career beginnings ===
Blake O'Connor was born in Windsor, New South Wales, before moving with his family to Bathurst and Port Macquarie. His grandparents gifted him an acoustic guitar for his sixth birthday. At 14, Blake had his first gig at a wedding which inspired his first song he wrote especially for the occasion. In 2015, he was a featured artist in the NSW School's Spectacular in Sydney and then made the decision to leave school to focus full-time on music.

=== 2016–2020: Everything I Feel ===
In January 2017, O'Connor visited Tamworth, New South Wales and won the Mount Franklin talent quest, the Capitol Country Music Association male vocal category, the Coca-Cola country best youngster in Tamworth and performed three times on the Peel Street stage and once on the ABC stage. Later in 2017, O'Connor entered and won the Coca-Cola Country competition and CCMA Junior talent quest, receiving a scholarship to attend the CMAA Academy.

In June 2018, O'Conner self-released his debut, self-titled extended play.

In January 2019, O'Connor became the 40th winner of the Toyota Star Maker at the Tamworth Country Music Festival.

In July 2019, O'Connor released his debut studio album Everything I Feel which he said "it's about everything I've been through in the last year with my emotions and experience." The album debuted at number 1 on the ARIA Country Album Chart and 31 on the ARIA All-Genre Charts. In September 2019, O'Connor released "Worth a Little More" as the album's second single, along with its video.

=== 2021–present: Finding Light ===
In February 2021, O'Connor released "Willin' and Ready", followed by "Soul Feeling" in July 2021. Both singles are from his forthcoming second studio album, Finding Light. The album was announced in January 2023, with a release date of 10 March 2023.

== Discography ==
=== Albums ===
Title	Details	Peak chart positions
Title	Details	AUS
Everything I Feel	Released: 12 July 2019; Format: CD, digital download, streaming; Label: Blake O'Connor	31
Finding Light	Released: 10 March 2023; Format: CD, digital download, streaming; Label: Blake O'Connor	100

=== Extended plays ===
Title	EP details
Blake O'Connor	Released: June 2018; Label: Blake O'Connor; Format: CD, digital download, streaming,

=== Singles ===
Year	Title	Album
2018	"Travelling Man"	Blake O'Connor
2019	"Beautiful As You"	Everything I Feel
2019	"Worth a Little More"	Everything I Feel
2021	"Willin' and Ready"	Finding Light
2021	"Soul Feeling"	Finding Light
2021	"Kickin' a Rock"	Finding Light
2022	"Little Bit Longer"	Finding Light
2023	"Time to Kill"	Finding Light

=== Other appearances ===
List of other non-single song appearances
Title	Year	Album
"Hole in My Head" (with Sinead Burgess)	2023	Halfway Down Under: A Tribute to Jim Lauderdale

== Awards ==
=== Country Music Awards of Australia ===
The Country Music Awards of Australia (CMAA) (also known as the Golden Guitar Awards) is an annual awards night held in January during the Tamworth Country Music Festival, celebrating recording excellence in the Australian country music industry. They have been held annually since 1973.

Year	Nominee / work	Award	Result	Ref.
2020	Blake O'Connor	Male Artist of the Year	Nominated	
2020	"Worth a Little More" by Blake Connor	New Talent of the Year	Won	
