= Blake Fitzpatrick =

Canadian artist (born 1955)

- Born: 21 July 1955; Oshawa, Ontario
- Education: B.A.A. Ryerson Polytechnical Institute, Toronto; M.F.A. Ohio State University; PhD, Ontario Institute for Studies in Education, University of Toronto

Blake Fitzpatrick FRSC is a photographer, curator and writer, who is concerned with the photographic representation of the nuclear era, contemporary militarism and the Berlin Wall as a mobile ruin.

== Early years ==
Blake Fitzpatrick was born in 1955 in Oshawa, Ontario. His earliest artistic influences came just after high school in the mid-1970s when he discovered The Americans by Swiss photographer Robert Frank. As a result, Fitzpatrick developed an interest in photography, which took him to Ryerson Polytechnical Institute in Toronto, for his B.A.A.. Later, he discovered the work of the artist, theorist and teacher Allan Sekula, author of the seminal essay "On the Invention of Photographic Meaning," and studied with him at Ohio State University. He graduated in 1984 with a MFA, then got his PhD, from the Ontario Institute for Studies in Education, University of Toronto.

== Career ==
Fitzpatrick made a long-term study of the history and effects of the uranium-processing industry on the town of Port Hope, Ontario, where he and his family were living. To describe what happened to this town, Fitzpatrick created an installation entitled Uranium Landscapes, first seen in an exhibition in Toronto in 1995. Starting in 2019, he created a documentary titled Future Mound through photography, video and writing, based on the development of the Port Hope Long-Term waste Management Facility, an above-ground storage mound for radioactive waste – due to radium and uranium refining – deposited throughout Port Hope. It is the most expensive municipal cleanup in Canadian history with a budget of $1.28 billion in federal funding.

In 2008, Fitzpatrick had an exhibition of his recent work at the Visual Arts Centre of Clarington, curated by Maralynne Cherry. In 2014, Freedom Rocks: The Everyday Life of the Berlin Wall, a long-term collaborative project that he produced with artist and Ryerson colleague Vid Ingelevics was exhibited at the Goethe-Institut in Los Angeles and was published in photography journals. The exhibition travelled widely and in different versions appeared elsewhere.

Fitzpatrick is a member of the Atomic Photographers Guild, an international collective of more than 20 photographers committed to documenting the on-going nuclear activity of the post "mushroom cloud" atomic era. He has curated or co-curated shows of contemporary artists who responded to zones of conflict and include War at a Distance: Visual Culture and the Framing of Public Conversations about Canadian Forces in Afghanistan; Disaster Topographics; and The Atomic Photographers Guild: Visibility and Invisibility in the Nuclear Era (2001). In 2013, he co-curated an exhibition of the work of Arthur S. Goss, titled Arthur S. Goss: Works and Days for the Ryerson Image Centre.

Fitzpatrick's writing and visual work have appeared in numerous journals and in edited collections including The Cultural Work of Photography in Canada (McGill-Queen's University Press (MQUP), 2011), Camera Atomica (Art Gallery of Ontario, 2015) and Through Post-Atomic Eyes (MQUP, 2020). He is co-editor of Critical Distance in Documentary Media (Palgrave Macmillan 2018) and contributed a chapter on the aerial image in contemporary documentary art for the volume. In 2020, with R. D. Tredici, he wrote Port Hope in the Era of Nuclear Waste which was published in C. Lauzon and John O'Brian (eds.), Through Post-Atomic Eyes (Montreal: MQUP).

Fitzpatrick has held a number of senior academic positions including the position of Dean, School of Design and Communication Arts at Durham College, Oshawa as well as Dean, Faculty of Art, at the Ontario College of Art and Design. He is presently a professor in the School of Image Arts, Ryerson University, Toronto and served as its chair as well as being co-director of the Documentary Media Research Centre. In 2020, he was elected to the Royal Society of Canada.

== Bibliography ==
- Del Tredici, Robert (1987). At Work in the Fields of the Bomb. Vancouver: Douglas & McIntyre. OCLC 16129563.
