= Blake Thompson =

Australian professional soccer player

Personal information
- Full name: Blake Edward Thompson
- Date of birth: 4 July 1993 (age 33)
- Place of birth: Gold Coast, Australia
- Height: 1.88 m (6 ft 2 in)
- Positions: Central defender; defensive midfielder

Team information
- Current team: Gold Coast Knights

Youth career
- QAS
- Wolves FC
- 2010–2013: Birmingham City
- 2013–2015: Crewe Alexandra
- 2015: Brisbane Roar

Senior career*
Years	Team	Apps	(Gls)
2015	Wolves FC	18	(0)
2016	FV Bad Honnef	14	(1)
2016–2017	Dordrecht	6	(0)
2017	Enfield Town	2	(0)
2017	Hednesford Town		
2018	Bentleigh Greens	27	(0)
2019	Mt Druitt Rangers	21	(0)
2020	Gold Coast Knights	7	(0)
2020	Brisbane City	9	(0)
2021	Mount Druitt Rangers	16	(0)
2021–	Gold Coast United	32	(3)
- * Club domestic league appearances and goals as of 23 September 2022

Blake Thompson (born 4 July 1993) is an Australian semi professional soccer player. He is currently signed to Brisbane City FC

== Club career ==
In 2012, Thompson moved from Queensland, where he had been playing with Brisbane Wolves, to England in the hopes of finding a club. He signed a contract with Birmingham City later in the year.

Thompson signed for Dordrecht in the Dutch Eerste Divisie in July 2016. He moved to England and signed for Enfield Town in the Isthmian League Premier Division in February 2017.

On 24 March 2017 Hednesford Town confirmed on their website, that they had signed with Thompson. In July 2018, Thompson would be released from the club after his contract ended.
