= Blake Marnell =

American political activist

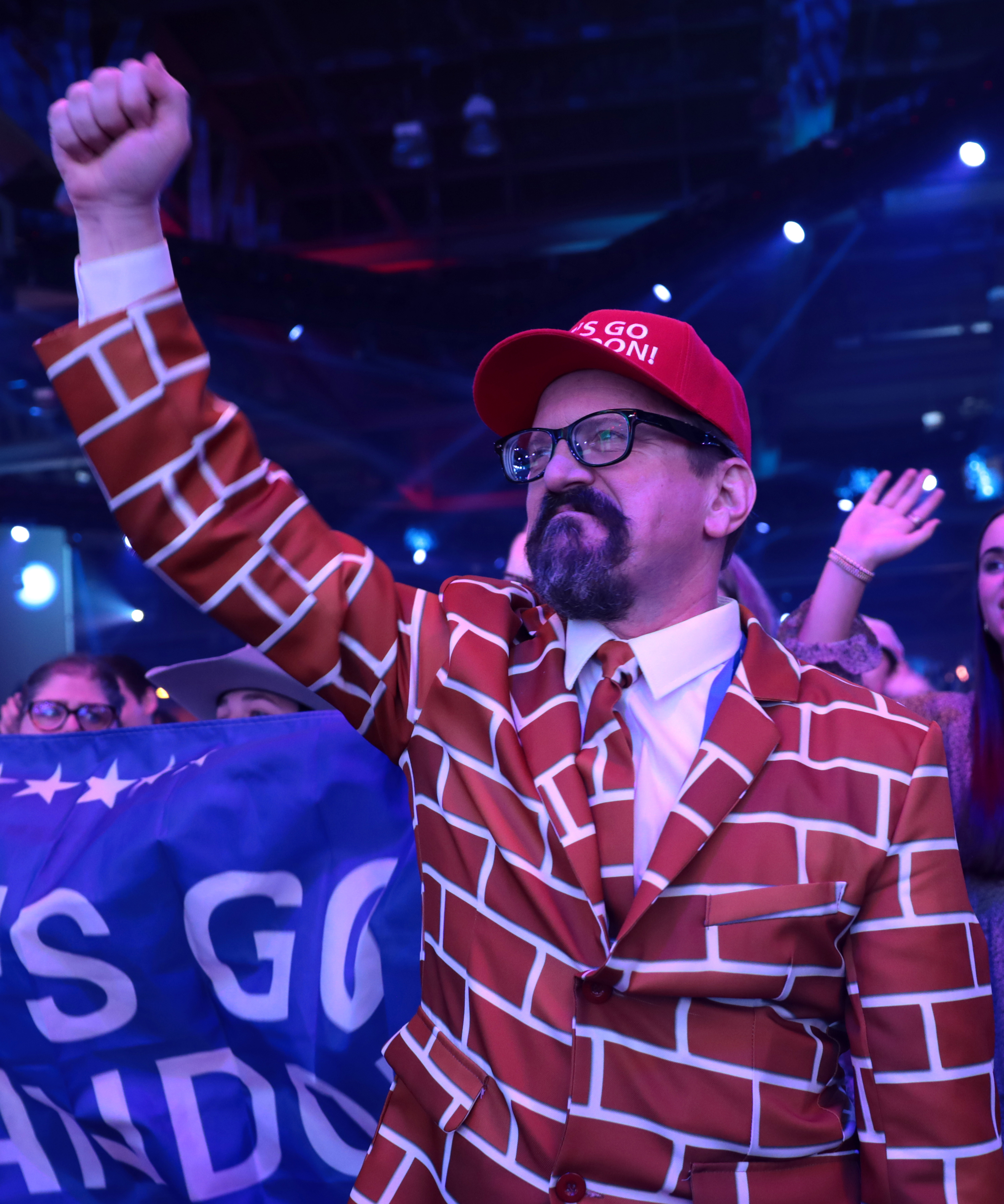
Marnell in 2021

Blake Marnell (born before 1967), also known as "Brick Suit" or "Brick Man", is an American political activist and media personality known for wearing a brick-patterned suit at Donald Trump rallies and other political events, a symbol of his support for the Mexico–United States border wall.

While Marnell is known for being a supporter of Donald Trump, he stated that prior to 2020 he had not cast a presidential ballot since he voted for Ronald Reagan in 1984.

On May 20, 2019, Marnell gained widespread attention after then-President Trump asked Marnell to join him onstage during a rally in Montoursville, Pennsylvania during his 2020 presidential campaign. Marnell was wearing the suit and holding a sign that said "Build Me" when he was called onstage. He described being called up on stage as an "out-of-body experience". Marnell stated that he had ordered the suit online, presumably on Amazon. The event in question took place while Trump was campaigning for Fred Keller, who was running to replace Tom Marino in a special election.

Marnell has since appeared at numerous political events. He has worked with Right Side Broadcasting Network. He lives in San Diego, California.
