= Mike Brown (ice hockey, born 1979) =

Canadian ice hockey player (born 1979)

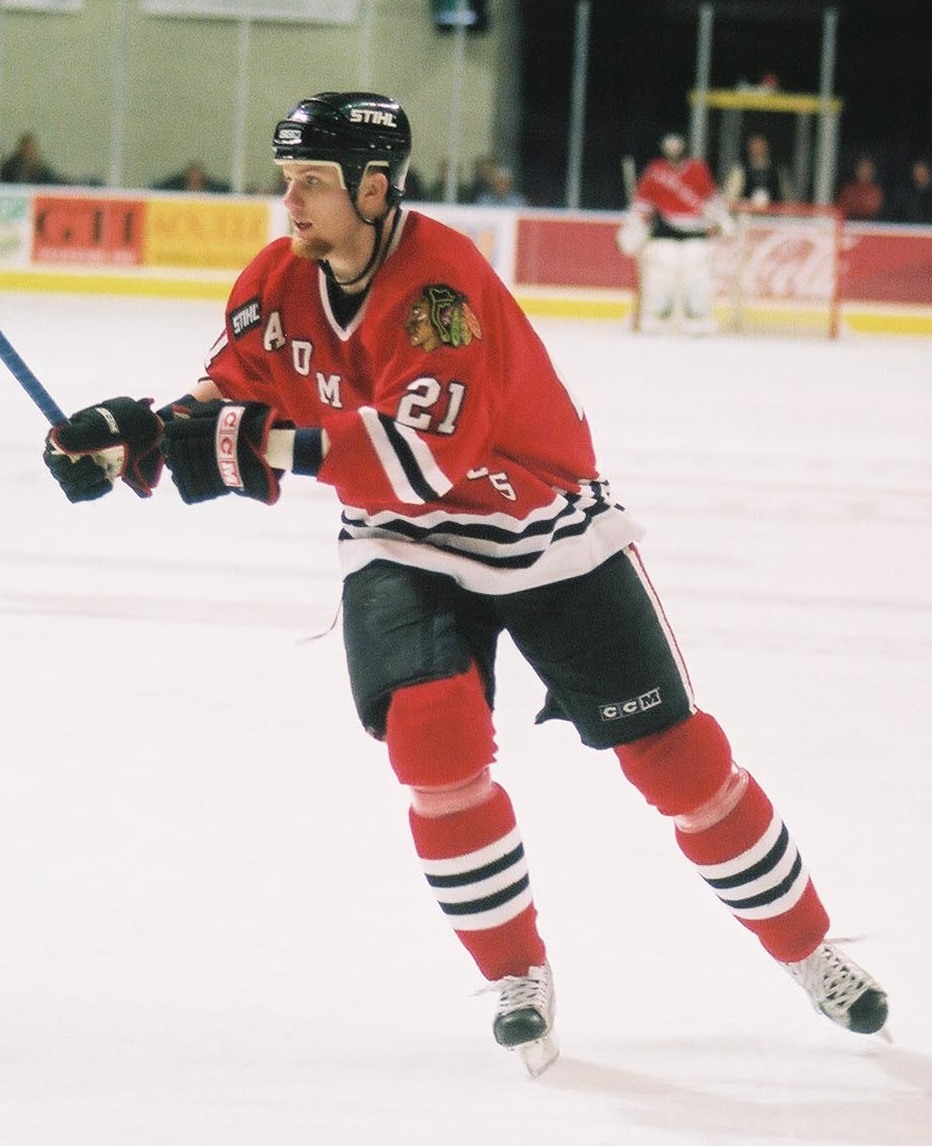
- Brown with the Norfolk Admirals in 2005
- Born: April 27, 1979 (age 46) Surrey, British Columbia, Canada
- Height: 6 ft 5 in (196 cm)
- Weight: 240 lb (109 kg; 17 st 2 lb)
- Position: Left wing
- Shot: Left
- Played for: Vancouver Canucks; Mighty Ducks of Anaheim; Chicago Blackhawks
- NHL draft: 20th overall, 1997; Florida Panthers
- Playing career: 1999–2006

Michael W. Brown (born April 29, 1979) is a Canadian former professional ice hockey winger. In his seven-year career, he played for the Vancouver Canucks, Mighty Ducks of Anaheim and Chicago Blackhawks in the National Hockey League (NHL).

== Early life ==
Born in Surrey, British Columbia, Brown played five years of major junior hockey in the Western Hockey League (WHL) with the Red Deer Rebels and Kamloops Blazers.

== Career ==
Brown was drafted 20th overall by the Florida Panthers in the 1997 NHL Entry Draft. He made his professional debut with the Syracuse Crunch of the American Hockey League (AHL) in the 1999–2000 season. His NHL debut came when he appeared in a single game for the Vancouver Canucks during the 2000–01 season. He would play 15 more games with the Canucks in the 2001–02 season.

Brown joined the Mighty Ducks of Anaheim in the 2002–03 season, during which he scored his only NHL goal. He then appeared in two games with the Chicago Blackhawks during the 2005–06 season before retiring.

Brown became the general manager of Barnes Harley-Davidson in Langley, British Columbia.

== Career statistics ==
			Regular season					Playoffs
Season	Team	League	GP	G	A	Pts	PIM	GP	G	A	Pts	PIM
1994–95	Merritt Centennials	BCHL	45	3	4	7	145	—	—	—	—	—
1994–95	Red Deer Rebels	WHL	1	0	0	0	0	—	—	—	—	—
1995–96	Red Deer Rebels	WHL	62	4	5	9	125	10	0	0	0	18
1996–97	Red Deer Rebels	WHL	70	19	13	32	243	16	1	2	3	47
1997–98	Kamloops Blazers	WHL	72	23	33	56	305	7	2	1	3	22
1998–99	Kamloops Blazers	WHL	69	28	16	44	285	15	3	7	10	68
1999–2000	Syracuse Crunch	AHL	71	13	18	31	284	4	0	0	0	0
2000–01	Vancouver Canucks	NHL	1	0	0	0	5	—	—	—	—	—
2000–01	Kansas City Blades	IHL	78	14	13	27	214	—	—	—	—	—
2001–02	Vancouver Canucks	NHL	15	0	0	0	72	—	—	—	—	—
2001–02	Manitoba Moose	AHL	31	7	9	16	155	6	0	1	1	16
2002–03	Mighty Ducks of Anaheim	NHL	16	1	1	2	44	—	—	—	—	—
2002–03	Cincinnati Mighty Ducks	AHL	27	3	3	6	85	—	—	—	—	—
2003–04	St. John's Maple Leafs	AHL	21	3	3	6	74	—	—	—	—	—
2003–04	Binghamton Senators	AHL	38	4	7	11	131	—	—	—	—	—
2004–05	Norfolk Admirals	AHL	68	7	8	15	286	—	—	—	—	—
2005–06	Chicago Blackhawks	NHL	2	0	1	1	9	—	—	—	—	—
2005–06	Norfolk Admirals	AHL	53	2	13	15	146	—	—	—	—	—
AHL totals			309	39	61	100	1161	10	0	1	1	16
NHL totals			34	1	2	3	130	—	—	—	—	—

Preceded by Marcus Nilson	Florida Panthers first-round draft pick 1997	Succeeded by Denis Shvidki
