= Blake Miller =

Blake Miller may refer to:

- Blake Miller (American football, born 1889) (1889–1987), American football player and coach
- Blake Miller (center) (born 1968), American football player
- Blake Miller (lacrosse) (born 1972), professional lacrosse player
- Blake Miller (offensive tackle) (born 2004), American football player

== See also ==
- Edward Blake Miller, Canadian politician
