= Young Chozen =

American rapper

- Born: Blake Christopher Young; November 13, 1986 (age 39); Los Angeles, California
- Occupations: Singer, rapper, songwriter, dancer
- Years active: 2006-present
- Known for: Christian Rap/Ministry
- Spouse: Lizzie Young
- Children: 3

Blake Christopher Young (born November 13, 1986), who used to go by the stage name Young Chozen, is a Christian hip-hop artist.

== Early life ==
Born and raised by a single mother in Los Angeles, California, Young grew up dealing with divorce, sexual molestation, drugs, gang violence, and bullying.

== Career ==
Young has appeared on the Disney Channel series The Suite Life on Deck and guest hosted ESPN's Elite 30. His song "Glow" reached number 3 in the Netherlands Christian and Gospel Music Chart in February 2013. He toured Australia in 2013, supporting Evermore in Perth.

Young appeared in a motivational speech with other public figures, where he went to schools like Willetton Senior High School on 24 August 2016.

== Albums ==
- Class President
- GLOW
