= Blake Stephen =

Canadian ice hockey player

- Born: November 29, 1960 (age 65) Calgary, Alberta, Canada
- Height: 5 ft 9 in (175 cm)
- Weight: 175 lb (79 kg; 12 st 7 lb)
- Position: Right wing
- Shot: Left
- Played for: IHL; Muskegon Mohawks; Toledo Goaldiggers; Salt Lake Golden Eagles
- Playing career: 1980–1985

Blake Stephen (born November 29, 1960) is a Canadian former professional ice hockey player.

Stephen played two seasons (1978 - 1980) of major junior hockey in the Western Hockey League with the Billings Bighorns and Saskatoon Blades, registering 40 goals and 54 assists for 94 points, while earning 289 penalty minutes, in 114 games played.

Stephen went on to play five seasons and 213 games in the International Hockey League (IHL). Stephen had a reputation as a tough player who could handle his own. While playing in the IHL with the Muskegon Mohawks, Toledo Goaldiggers, and Salt Lake City Golden Eagles, he scored 62 goals and 77 assists for 139 points, while racking up 774 penalty minutes.

== Career statistics ==
			Regular season					Playoffs
Season	Team	League	GP	G	A	Pts	PIM	GP	G	A	Pts	PIM
1976–77	Merritt Centennials	BCJHL	68	11	27	38	159	—	—	—	—	—
1977–78	Merritt Centennials	BCJHL	61	49	44	93	154	—	—	—	—	—
1978–79	Billings Bighorns	WHL	23	8	9	17	40	—	—	—	—	—
1978–79	Saskatoon Blades	WHL	32	9	10	19	104	9	5	0	5	13
1979–80	Saskatoon Blades	WHL	59	23	35	58	145	—	—	—	—	—
1980–81	Muskegon Mohawks	IHL	56	21	24	45	176	—	—	—	—	—
1980–81	Toledo Goaldiggers	IHL	10	3	3	6	28	—	—	—	—	—
1981–82	Toledo Goaldiggers	IHL	23	7	10	17	145	—	—	—	—	—
1982–83	Toledo Goaldiggers	IHL	10	0	4	4	46	—	—	—	—	—
1983–84	Toledo Goaldiggers	IHL	62	14	18	32	175	11	1	6	7	63
1984–85	Toledo Goaldiggers	IHL	29	6	12	18	129	—	—	—	—	—
1984–85	Salt Lake Golden Eagles	IHL	23	11	6	17	75	6	0	1	1	39
IHL totals			213	62	77	139	774	17	1	7	8	102
