= Blake Richardson =

Blake Richardson may refer to:

- Blake Richardson (drummer), American drummer for the band Between the Buried and Me and the band Glass Casket
- Blake Richardson (singer), member of British band New Hope Club
