= Blake F. Donaldson =

American physician and writer (1892–1966)

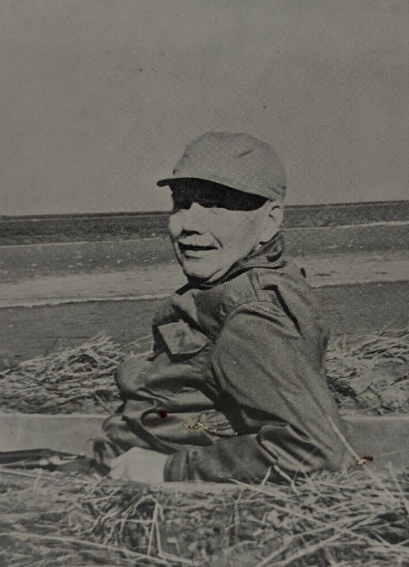
- Born: 6 May 1892; Islip, New York
- Died: 19 February 1966 (aged 73); Hauppauge, New York
- Occupations: Physician, writer

Blake Ferguson Donaldson (6 May 1892 – 19 February 1966) was an American physician, hunter and early advocate of a meat-only diet, which later became known as the carnivore diet.

== Career ==
Donaldson was a physician at Long Island College Hospital in Brooklyn in 1913. Donaldson was a First Lieutenant in the medical Northeastern Department of the Red Cross Hospital sent to France during World War I. In May 1917, he was assigned to duty at Governors Island.

Donaldson was resident physician at New York Post-Graduate Medical School. In 1921, Donaldson examined a large number of children from the East Side of New York and found that syphilis is not a great factor in the causation of heart disease. In 1925, Donaldson was Clinical Instructor in Medicine at the New York Post-Graduate Medical School. He was former chief medical officer at the City Hospital of New York. Donaldson was a specialist in internal medicine and his office was located at 121 East 60th Street, New York.

== Strong Medicine ==
Donaldson authored Strong Medicine which was published by Doubleday in 1962. The book advocated fresh fat meat, water and exercise to treat allergies, cardiovascular disease, diabetes, hypertension, gallstones and obesity. The book described "the big bad seven" foods: milk, cream, ice cream, eggs, cheese, chocolate and flour which should be eliminated from the diet. Surgeon Charles G. Heyd wrote a supportive preface for the book.

The diet that Donaldson put his patients on consisted of three fatty steaks a day, three cups of coffee and six glasses of water.

Donaldson's Strong Medicine was criticized by physician Morris Fishbein who commented that the "book is hardly scientific, so presumably what the physician was taught in his youth he has forgotten in his later years." Donaldson's extreme dietary views were classified by Fredrick J. Stare as "food faddism". Stare cited Donaldson as an example of a physician with no training or real understanding of modern nutrition. Stare included Donaldson's Strong Medicine in a list of books on nutritional quackery, which "ought not to be on anyone's shelves".

== Personal life ==
Donaldson was the son of postmaster William W. Donaldson and Helen Scott Donaldson. He married Harriott Cate. They had a son Blake Donaldson, who died age 51 in 1977.

Donaldson died from a heart attack at his home in Hauppauge, New York. He was 73.

== Selected publications ==
- Syphilis in Children of School Age With Heart Disease (New York State Journal of Medicine, 1921)
- Strong Medicine (Doubleday, 1962)

== Quotes ==
During the millions of years that our ancestors lived by hunting, every weakling who could not maintain perfect health on fresh fat meat and water was bred out. There are probably only two perfect foods – fresh fat meat and clean water. Whenever you are in a jam with the human body, it is well to go back to the common inheritance of mankind. People have only been eating junk for eight thousand years, and that is a fleabite in evolution. An evolutionary process takes a million years.

— Blake F. Donaldson, in 1962
