= Jessie Ball duPont Center =

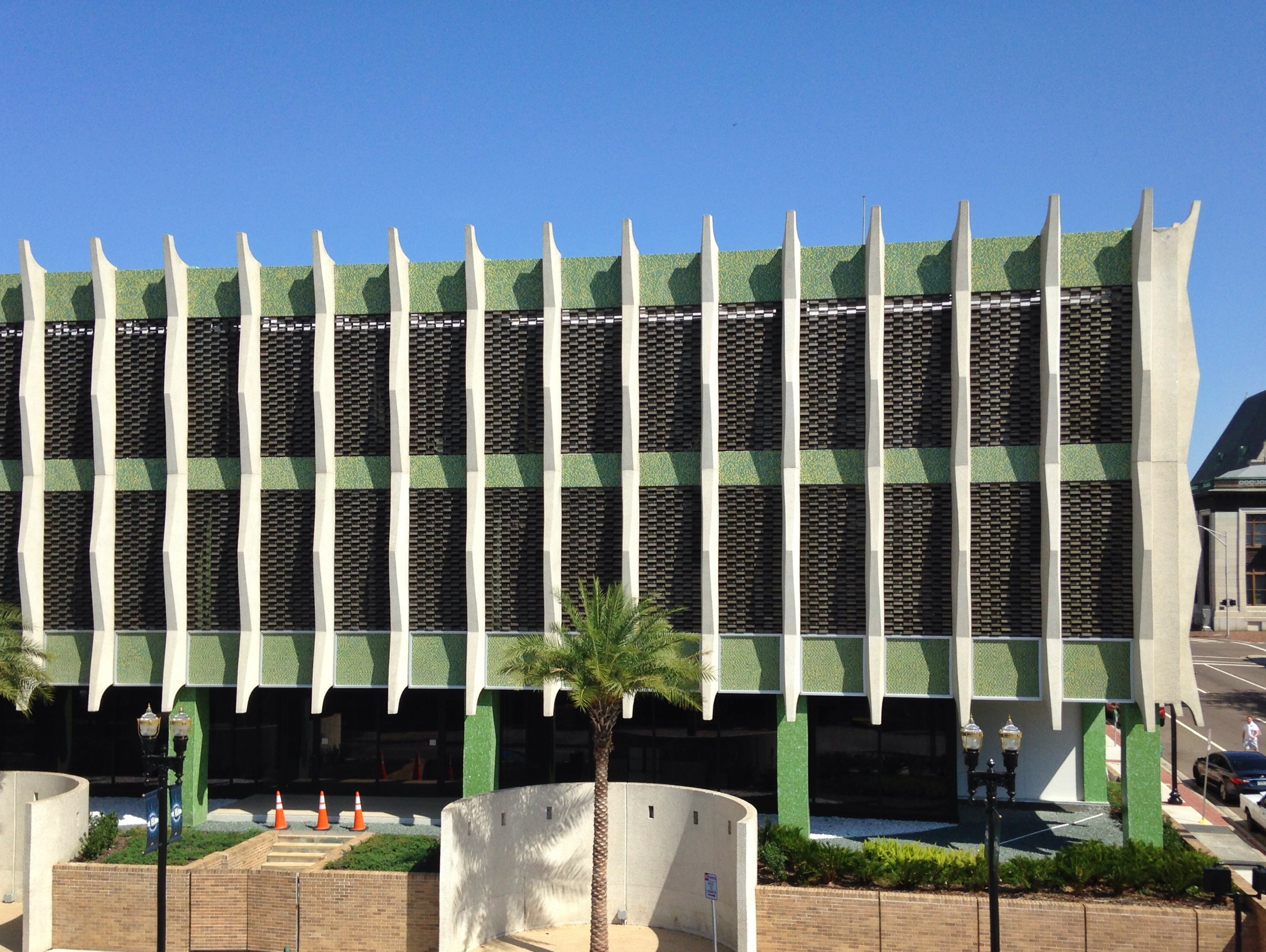

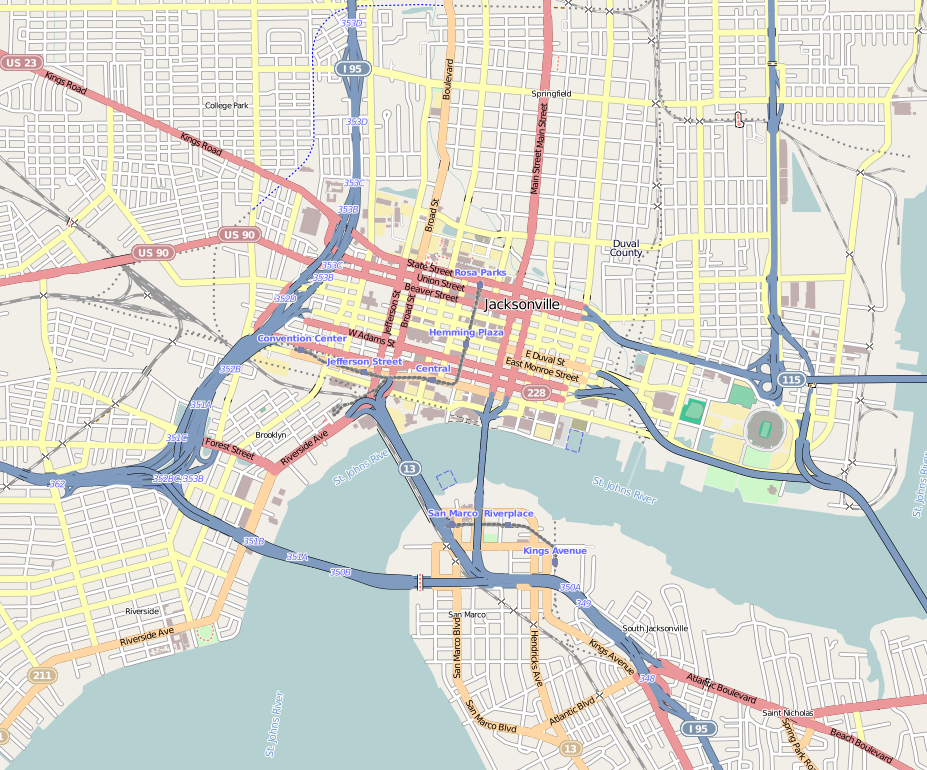
- Location within Central Jacksonville Jessie Ball duPont Center (Florida)
- Former names: Haydon Burns Library

General information
- Type: Class "A" office
- Location: 122 Ocean Street
- Coordinates: 30.32731°N 81.65682°W
- Construction started: 1964
- Completed: 1965
- Opening: 1965
- Cost: $3.7 million
- Owner: Jessie Ball duPont Fund

Height
- Roof: 447 ft (136 m)

Technical details
- Floor count: 4
- Floor area: 122,000 sq ft (11,300 m^{2})
- Lifts/elevators: 1

Design and construction
- Architect: Taylor Hardwick
- Developer: City of Jacksonville
- Main contractor: The Auchter Company

The Jessie Ball duPont Center is a nonprofit complex in downtown Jacksonville, Florida. The building served as the main branch of the Jacksonville Public Library system from 1965 until 2005, when it was replaced by the current facility. The library was named for W. Haydon Burns, who served as Mayor of Jacksonville for fifteen years and also served two years as Governor of Florida. The Haydon Burns Library replaced the Jacksonville Free Public Library (a Carnegie Library), which was built in 1905 and designed by Henry John Klutho of New York City. On April 18, 2012, the AIA's Florida Chapter placed the building on its list of Florida Architecture: 100 Years. 100 Places.

== History ==
Haydon Burns Library in Jacksonville, ca. 1968

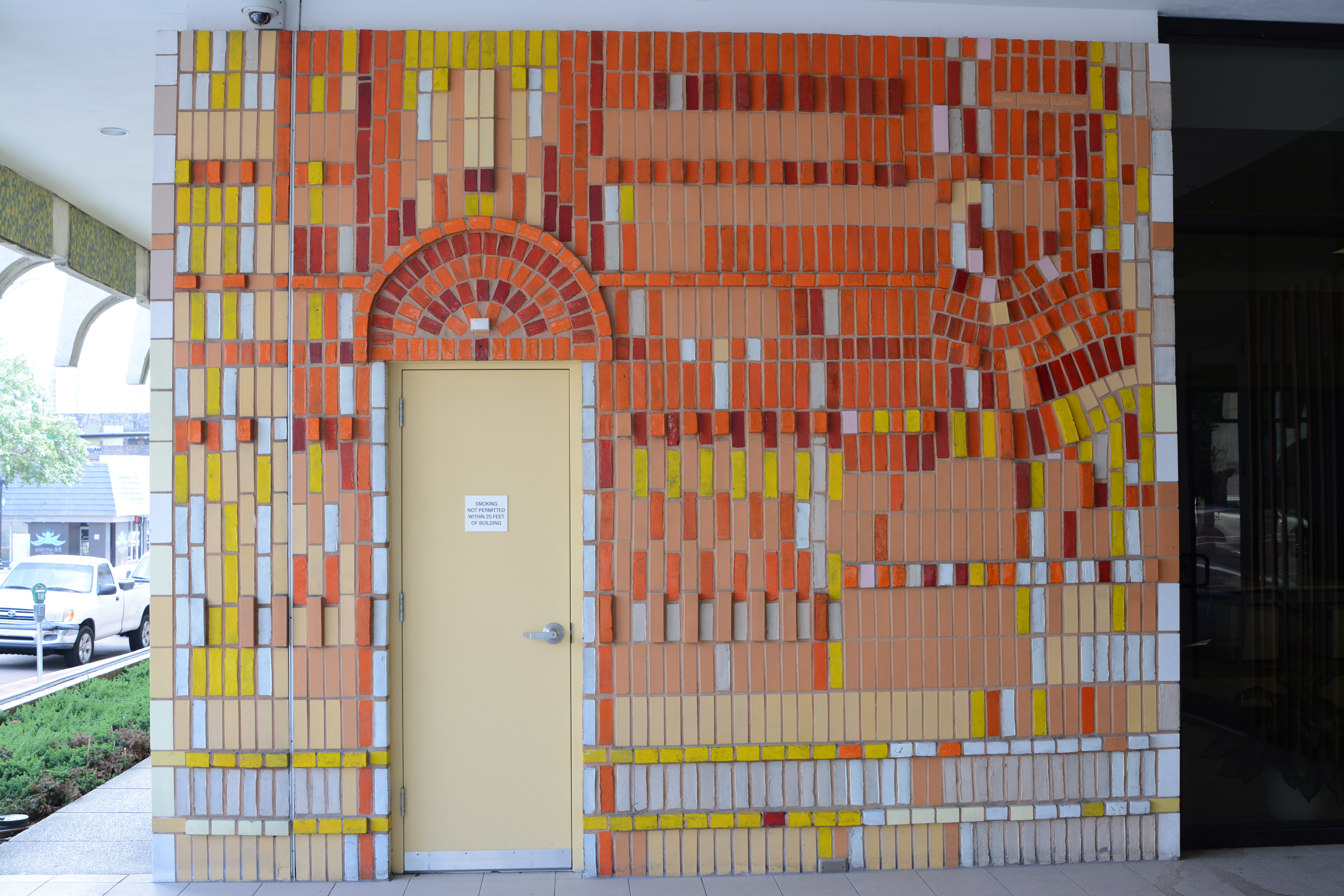
Colorful mural

When built in 1965 at a cost of $3.7 million, it was considered state of the art. The 126,000 sq ft (11,700 m^{2}), three-story building was designed by local architect Taylor Hardwick, who designed dozens of other buildings in Jacksonville starting in the mid-1950s including the Skinner Dairy chain and Friendship Fountain and Park. John Hall Jacobs, a nationally known library consultant, also contributed to the design process. Hardwick worked on the library building's design over a span of five years, and his comprehensive plan specified all interior furnishings, graphics and the use of innovative, free-standing book shelves. He chose cheerful colors and limited the use of natural light. The walls surrounding the central elevator tower are covered with colorful murals made of 10,000 glazed bricks. The ground floor has floor to ceiling windows to allow pedestrians to view library activity. The exterior walls facing Ocean and Adams streets have 88 "fins" extending from the second floor to the roof, like the 88 keys on a piano. The fins catch the wind and cast shadows to help keep the building cool. Building construction was performed by The Auchter Company of Jacksonville.

== Closure ==
The building served Jacksonville well, but by the mid-1990s, it was simply inadequate for the number of patrons using it. Parking was very limited and the 30-year-old wiring could not support the technology requirements for a modern library. Almost 300,000 people used the Burns library each year, ten percent of the total users of the Jacksonville Public Library system. In September 2000 Jacksonville voters approved the Better Jacksonville Plan, including funding for a new downtown library. The Haydon Burns Library checked out its last book on September 3, 2005. It took several weeks to move the library's half-million-item collection to the new facility. On November 12, 2005 the new Main Library opened to the public.

| Preceded by Carnegie Library (opened 1905) | Downtown Public Library; Haydon Burns Library; 1965–2005 | Succeeded by Main Library; 2005 |

== For sale ==
The transfer of the building from the city to a private owner was a long and winding road. The city requested bids on the property from developers while the new Main Library was still under construction and selected The Atkins Group as the winner in July, 2005. Atkins wanted to tear down the library to build condominiums, but walked away from the deal after a financing dispute with the city. City officials then approached runner-up Peterbrooke Chocolatier, a local candy company that wanted to turn the building into a chocolate factory. That deal fell through because Peterbrooke's needs had changed and environmental clean-up would cost more than expected.

The city briefly planned to keep the library for storage or repeat the bid process, but eventually negotiated a contract with the third choice bidder, Main Branch LLC, whose $3.25 million bid for a mixed-use project would retain most of the building's character. An agreement was reached and the city council approved the sale on November 15, 2006. The sale closed in April, 2007 and the building was renamed "122 Ocean". One component of Main Branch's plan was to build two additional floors for condominiums, but that was to be a later phase. The building would include a number of businesses, including City Market, downtown's first urban grocery store. Negotiations were ongoing with prospective tenants, including Folio Weekly, a wine bar, a jazz club, a bar, two coffee shops, a cereal bar, a residential Realtor, a pair of film companies, a design & furniture store and a four-screen movie theater, according to Tony Allegretti, a Main Branch partner and investor. Some developers suggested tearing down the 1960s landmark, but Main Branch saw historical and financial value in its redevelopment. Allegretti stated, "One of the real motivations in this real estate cycle is you couldn't build this building for $20 million".

Before any redevelopment even began, the late 2000s recession struck, ending all plans. The private investment group held onto the structure, and conditions finally started to improve in 2012. Main Branch's Bill Cesery led the negotiations with Latitude Global, a privately held restaurant and entertainment company, to purchase the building for their corporate headquarters. After Latitude's letter of intent expired, the Jessie Ball duPont Fund began discussing their idea for the building.

== New usage ==
Following a 90-day due diligence period which included a building inspection and a feasibility study, the Jessie Ball duPont Fund (JBDF) completed the purchase on June 19, 2013 for $2.2 million, $1 million less than Main Branch LLC paid six years earlier. Sherry Magill, president of the JBDF stated that the building will become a "philanthropic and nonprofit center that will be home to a variety of organizations, including the Jessie Ball duPont Fund. Collectively, these tenant organizations will benefit from the synergy created when they co-locate". Similar non-profit facilities have been established in Dallas, Texas (Center for Nonprofit Management) and Wilmington, Delaware (Community Service Building).

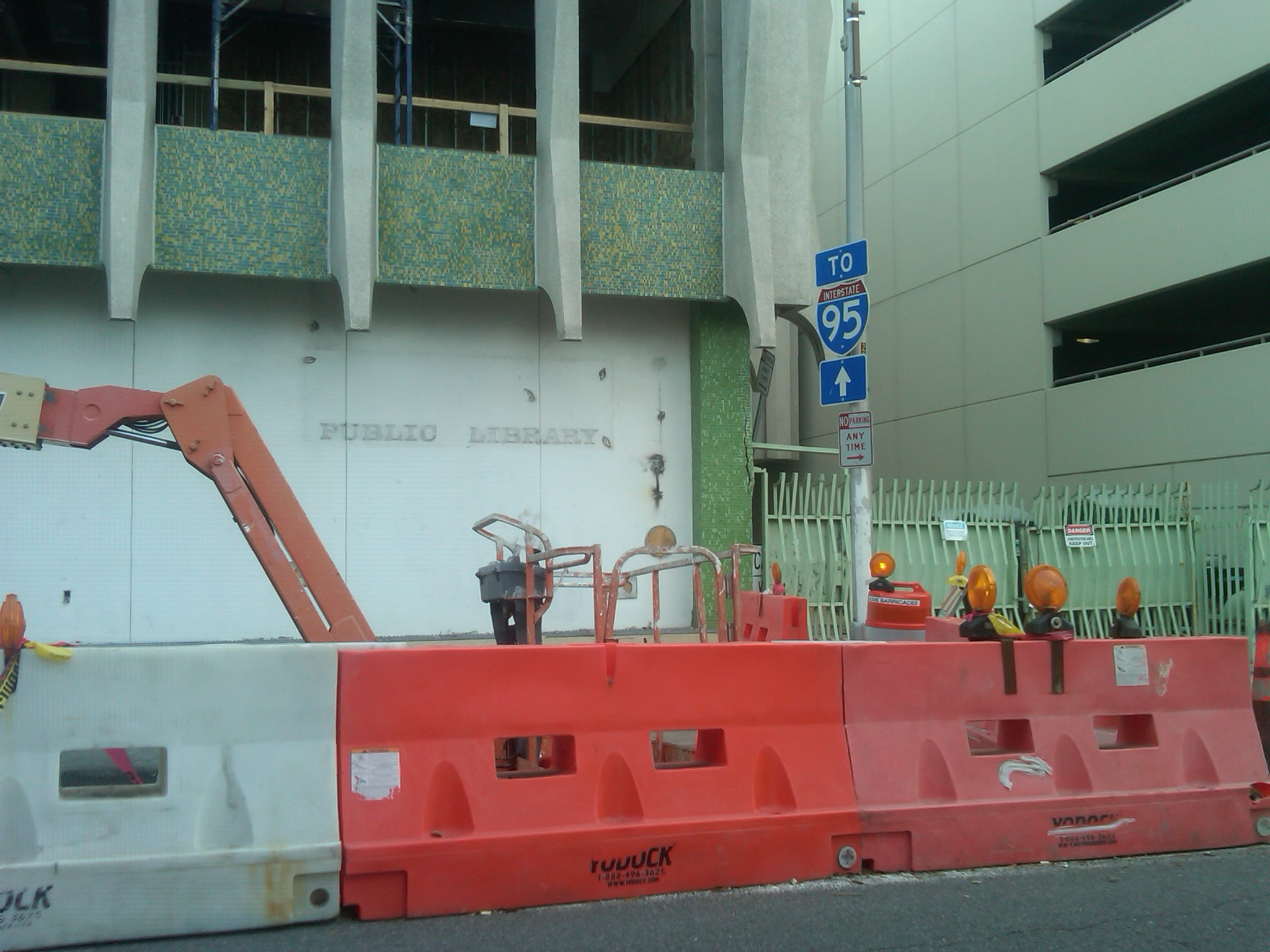
Renovation of the Haydon Burns Library in 2014

The fund formed JBDF LLC to own and operate the facility, which will offer stable monthly lease amounts well below commercial rates, and savings through bulk purchasing at the center.

At the time, the Fund's offices in the Wells Fargo Center occupied 6,500 sq ft (600 m^{2}), a small portion of the former library's three floors with 80,000 sq ft (7,400 m^{2}) of rentable space, not including a 33,000 sq ft (3,100 m^{2}) basement which can be used in case of a disaster. To reduce operating expenses and demonstrate the energy saving benefits of green building, the JBDF planned to include conservation features to achieve LEED certification. With a budget of $20 million, renovations were projected to require 18 months, so occupancy was not expected until late 2014 at the earliest.

In May 2014, interior gutting and cleanup was nearing completion, with construction expected to last less than a year. The JBDF opened the Jessie Ball duPont Center in 2015.

== See also ==
- Architecture of Jacksonville
- Jessie Ball duPont Fund
