= Friendship Fountain =

Fountain in Jacksonville, Florida, US

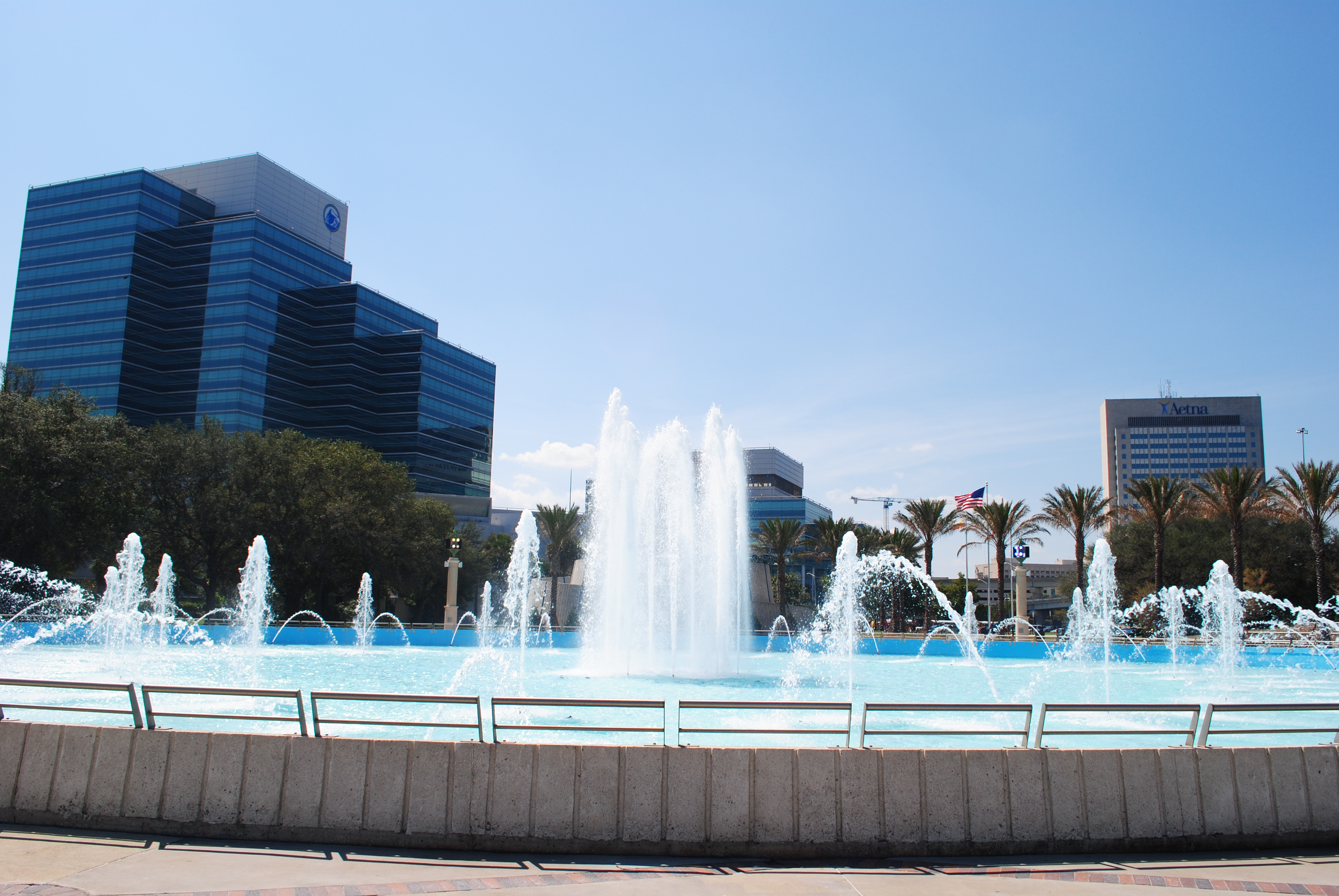
- The newly renovated Friendship Fountain in 2011

- Location within Florida
- Location: 1015 Museum Circle, Jacksonville, Florida, U.S.
- Coordinates: 30.320012°N 81.659812°W
- Area: 11 acres (0.045 km^{2})
- Established: 1965
- Designer: Taylor Hardwick
- Operator: Jacksonville Department of Parks, Recreation and Community Services
- Visitors: 600,000
- Open: Year round
- Public transit: water taxi
- Website: Friendship Fountain

Friendship Fountain is a large fountain in Jacksonville, Florida. It is in St. Johns River Park (also known as Friendship Fountain Park) at the west end of Downtown Jacksonville's Southbank Riverwalk attraction. The world's largest and tallest fountain when it opened, it has been one of Jacksonville's most recognizable and popular attractions.

The fountain and park were designed by Jacksonville architect Taylor Hardwick in 1963 and opened in 1965. The fountain's three pumps could push 17,000 US gallons (64,000 L) of water per minute up to 120 feet (37 m) in height. Friendship Fountain remained one of Jacksonville's signature attractions through the 20th century, but severe corrosion and deterioration to the equipment resulted in periodic closures in the 2000s. In 2011 the city completed a $3.2 million renovation to the fountain and the surrounding park. A second renovation began in 2020 and, after several delays, was completed in 2024, with a nearly $8 million budget.

== History ==
The original Friendship Fountain & Park

The fountain and Friendship Park was designed by Taylor Hardwick, the Jacksonville architect who also designed the Haydon Burns Library. An area of 14 acres (57,000 m^{2}) of land were donated for the project by the Southside Business Men's Club, an organization dedicated to the improvement of the Southside that was established in 1932. Begun in 1963 and completed at a cost of $1.7 million, the park opened in March 1965. The "world’s largest and tallest" fountain at the time, it became a popular tourist attraction.

The three pumps had a combined 750 horsepower (560 kW) and could push 17,000 US gallons (64,000 L) per minute; some streams as tall as a 10-story building. The enclosure for the pumps and controls was so large that the architect had to include it as an element of design.

The Fountain was originally called the "Fountain of Friendship in Dallas Thomas Park"; friendship at the suggestion of a Rotary Club member and Dallas Thomas after the city's parks and finance commissioner. However, when Thomas was later involved in a scandal and indicted, the park was renamed in 1968.

=== Harbormasters and River City Brewing Company ===
The Acosta Bridge was rebuilt beginning in 1990, and the city agreed to use a big portion of Friendship park for a new restaurant and parking lot, cutting the park by more than half. Essentially, all the design structures in the park were removed-—with the exception of the fountain itself—-for what became a boondoggle. The new facility was named Harbormasters, and the city guaranteed a $2.9 million federal building loan on the city's land. Initial success was followed by lawsuits, a new owner, missed rent payments, foreclosure, loan default and finally closure in 1992. When the venture failed, the city had to pay off the nearly $3 million loan. The River City Brewing Company, which replaced Harbormasters in November 1993, has been successful, but because the city owns the land, the restaurant pays no property taxes.

In October 2020 Maritime Concepts L.C., which owned River City Brewing Company, submitted a plan to the Downtown Investment Authority (DIA) to raze the restaurant and create an 8-story building with 325 apartments. A DIA staff report stated that Maritime Concepts had contracted with The Related Companies to sell the unexpired lease with the City of Jacksonville. The terms of the 99-year lease, which began in 1988, specified $40,000 in base each year plus 0.5% of revenue above $4.5 million. The report also noted that, “During the term of this lease, the lessee has not achieved the threshold to pay the Additional Rent, which in combination with the continuing disrepair of the docks, provides evidence of the underutilization of this high-profile asset.” Other elements of the proposal include releasing 1/3 acre from the lease resulting in the addition of 110 feet to the Jacksonville Riverwalks and a small corridor for public access to the river walk. The deal would also provide the company with 20 years of city tax rebates but not affect school taxes. The restaurant stated that if the proposal is approved, they would relocate.

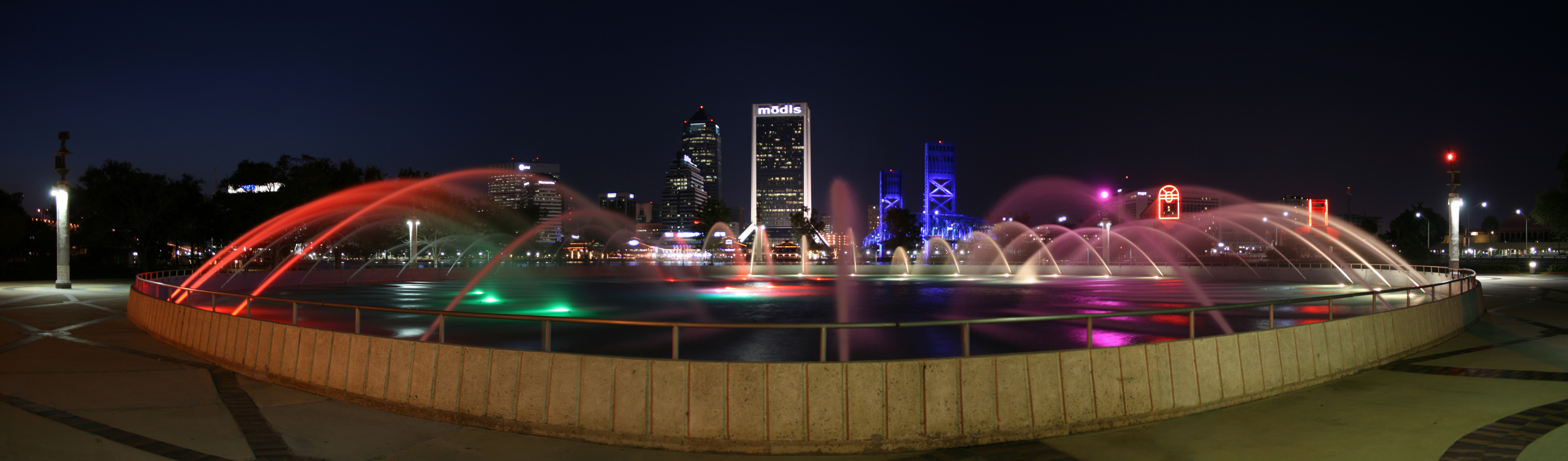
The fountain at night running on one pump.

=== Long service ===
Friendship Fountain functioned for over 20 years and was refurbished in December 1985, before resuming operation for another 15 years. Finally, wear and corrosion forced its closure at the end of the century. A five-month, $1.3 million rehabilitation began when the fountain was drained in March 2001. A new feature was added: six light towers with computer-controlled color-changing floodlights. Unanticipated damage to stainless steel pipes was uncovered, requiring a $97,000 increase in cost and two-month delay, but the fountain re-opened in December 2001. It operated for seven months until a power outage/voltage spike damaged the computer controller and blew out 40 lights and lenses on April 29, 2002. That was repaired, and the fountain was fully functional for nearly 3 years. It was a major attraction at Super Bowl XXXIX in February 2005, but two months later, two of the three original (40-year-old) pumps failed and parts were no longer available. The replacement cost for the pumps was estimated at $400,000, but the city budget was tight and money was not available. Afterward the fountain was run on one pump with a greatly reduced flow. It was repaired in 2011 and is functional.

== Features ==
- The fountain's basin is 200 feet (61 m) in diameter holding 500,000 US gallons (1,900,000 L) of water which is treated according to swimming pool sanitation standards.
- The spray component consists of three rings.
- The outer ring contains 36 nozzles, equally spaced around the perimeter, projecting a stream of water inward at a 45° angle, rising 35 feet (11 m), driven by a 250 horsepower (190 kW) motor with a pump capacity of 6,750 GPM
- The middle ring is 120 feet (37 m) in diameter and consists of 18 nozzles directed vertically, rising to a height of 40 feet (12 m), driven by a 150 horsepower (110 kW) motor with a pump capacity of 4,500 GPM.
- The center ring is 15 feet (4.6 m) in diameter and contains nine nozzles operating vertically, rising to a height of 120 feet (37 m), driven by a 350 horsepower (260 kW) motor with a pump capacity of 5,500 GPM.
- The fountain has an anemometer that controls the height of the center nozzles. If the force of the wind is from 5 to 15 miles (24 km) an hour, the height of the center nozzles will not exceed 70 feet (21 m). For wind speed in excess of 15 miles (24 km) an hour, the height of the center nozzles is limited to 50 feet (15 m). This was done to control the blow-off of water into the park and onto persons around the fountain.
- Each nozzle has a cluster of four lights: dark red, light red, turquoise and amber.

== Current status ==
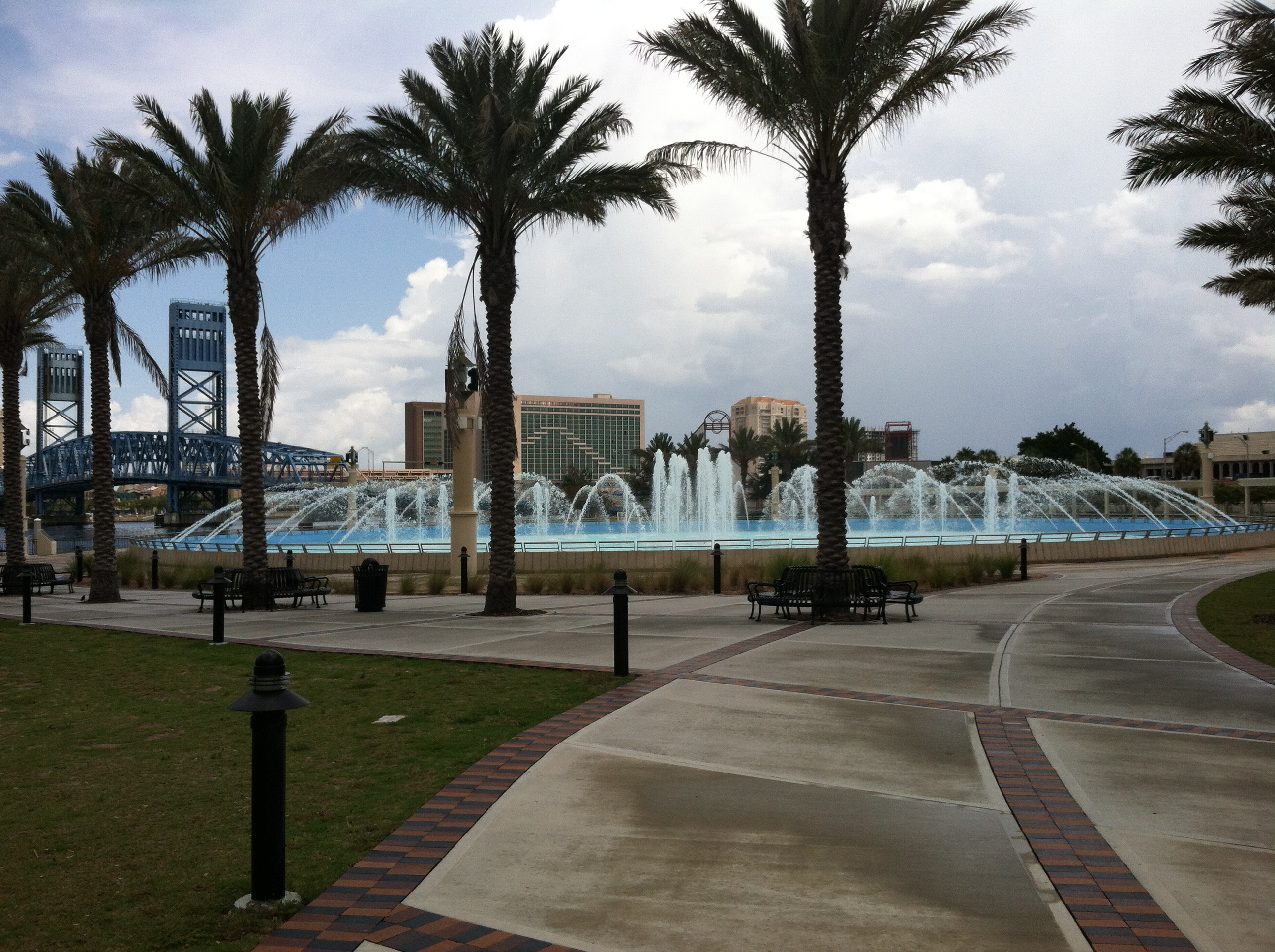
The fountain with path lighting and colored light towers around the fountain.

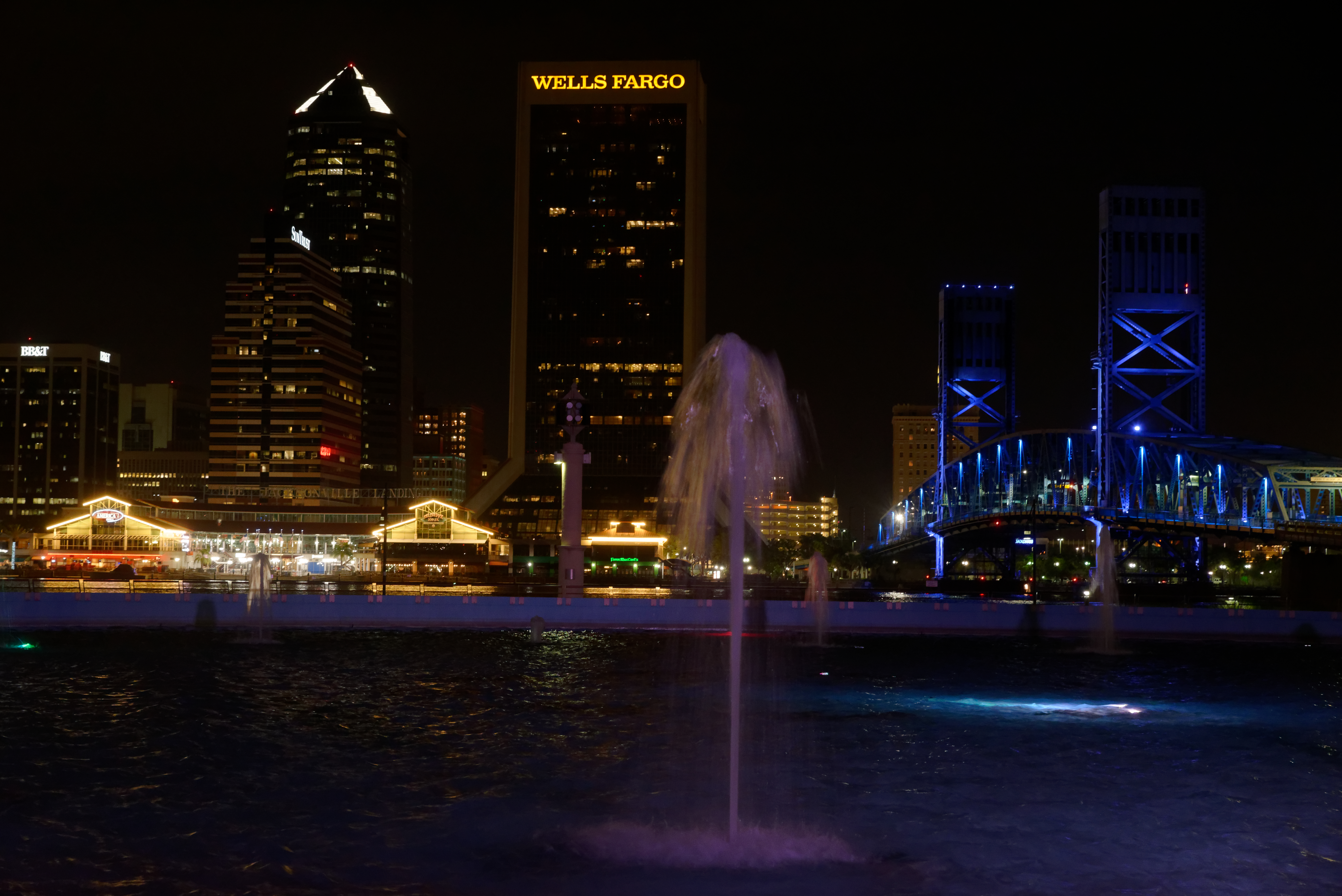
The fountain in 2018

The future of the Jacksonville landmark was in doubt for a number of years. A number of proposals were made, including moving Kids Kampus from Metropolitan Park and eliminating the fountain, rebuilding a smaller fountain or renovating the existing fountain. As of May 2008, there was $15 million in the city's capital projects budget to improve the Southbank Riverwalk, which includes the area around Friendship Fountain; but Mayor John Peyton felt the amount was not enough.

The Jacksonville City Council approved final plans for a $3.2 million renovation and repair to the surrounding park and Friendship Fountain on February 9, 2010. On August 10, 2010 the Friends of Friendship Fountain Website, reported communications from the Jacksonville Economic Development Commission that AC General Inc was named contractor for the project. An official groundbreaking was held on September 1, 2010, marking the start of the renovation of Friendship Fountain and Park. The fountain was closed for eight months for construction, and reopened again on June 18, 2011, amid a celebration.

A major renovation took place during 2020–2021. The attraction was reopened on February 15, 2024. The fountain flows from 8:00 a.m. to 10:00 p.m. daily.

In early February 2025, Mayor Donna Deegan gave an update on the Fountain. Since its reopening, more than 600,000 people had visited the fountain. St. Johns River Park surrounds the fountain and construction is continuing on a play park with a history theme, a venue for weddings, restrooms and a picnic area. An interpretive garden will illustrate the founding of Jacksonville. Projected completion is early 2026.
