= Jacksonville Public Library =

Public library system in Florida

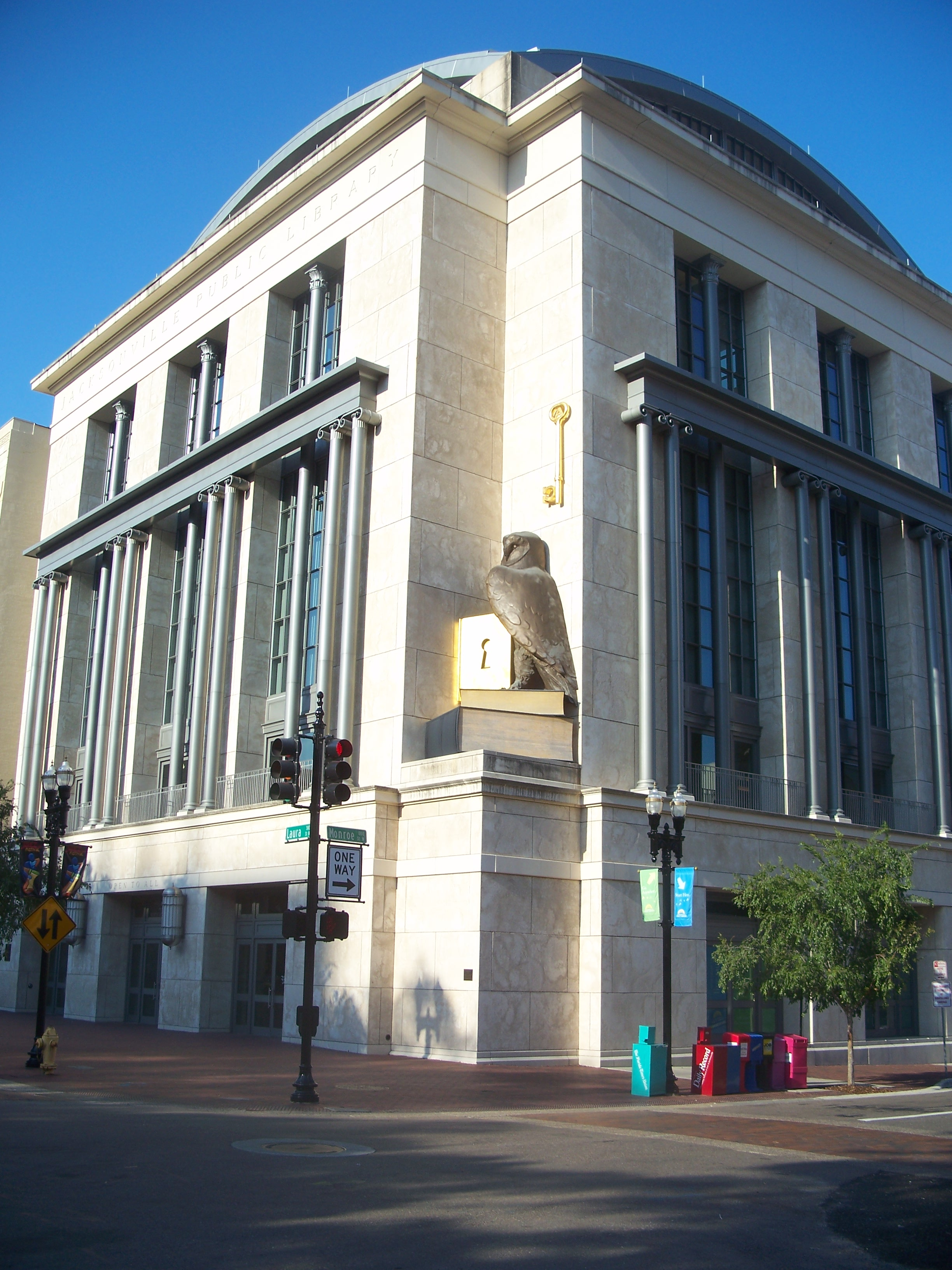
- Start here. Go anywhere.
- 30.329055°N 81.657958°W
- Location: Jacksonville, Florida
- Established: 1878,1903
- Branches: 22

Collection
- Size: 2,354,787 (2015)

Access and use
- Circulation: 4.2 million (FY2022)
- Population served: 1.8 million (FY2022)
- Members: 580,904 (2012–13)

Other information
- Budget: $32,156,402 (FY2022)
- Director: Tim Rogers
- Employees: 500
- Website: jaxpubliclibrary.org

The Jacksonville Public Library is the public library system of Jacksonville, Florida, United States. It primarily serves Jacksonville and Duval County merged areas, and is also used by the neighboring Baker, Nassau, Clay, and St. Johns counties. It is one of the largest library systems in Florida, with a collection of over three million items. A division of the city government, the library has the third largest group of city employees, after the city's fire department and sheriff's office. There are twenty-one branches and a main library in the system.

== Branches ==
=== Main Library ===
Located downtown near City Hall and Hemming Plaza, the Main Library opened in November 2005, replacing the Haydon Burns Library. Designed by the firm of the 2011 Driehaus Prize winner, Robert A.M. Stern Architects, the new library is almost three times the size of the Haydon Burns building. Jacksonville's Auchter Company was responsible for construction. The North Laura facility is 300,000 square feet (28,000 m^{2}) with the capacity to hold one million books. A 600-space parking garage across from the library building on Duval Street makes the Main Library easily accessible. State-of-the-art technology offers 250 public computers, satellite, and video conferencing capabilities with infrastructure to support future technologies. On April 18, 2012, the AIA Florida Chapter named the Jacksonville Public Library – Main Library on its list of Florida Architecture: 100 Years. 100 Places.

In addition to the library and the conference center, the library building hosted a bookstore and a café. The BOOKtique bookstore, run by the Friends of the Library, opened concurrently with the library. In 2013, the BOOKtique was closed to make way for The Lounge @ 303 North, an event space in the library's lower Conference Center level. After a year and a half of litigation and construction, on May 14, 2007, Shelby's Café opened inside the concession space in the Main Library. The concession stand closed in 2011.

=== Regional libraries ===
- Charles Webb Wesconnett – 103rd Street, serving the Westside
- Highlands – Dunn Avenue, serving the Northside
- Pablo Creek – Beach Blvd., between Hodges and Kernan, serving the Southside
- Southeast – Deerwood Park Blvd., serving the Southside

=== Community and neighborhood branches ===
- Argyle – near the Argyle Forest subdivision, serving the Westside
- Beaches – A1A (3rd Street) in Neptune Beach
- Bill Brinton Murray Hill – Edgewood Avenue South, serving the urban core
- Bradham and Brooks – Edgewood Avenue, serving the Northside
- Brentwood – Pearl St., serving the urban core
- Brown Eastside – Harrison Street, serving the urban core
- Dallas Graham – Myrtle Avenue, serving the urban core
- JPL Express Oceanway- Sago Avenue W, serving the Oceanway community
- Mandarin – Kori Road, serving the Mandarin area
- Maxville – Maxville Blvd. (near Normandy Boulevard and Highway 301), serving the Maxville area.
- Regency Square – Regency Square Blvd., serving the Arlington/Regency area
- San Marco – The San Marco Branch on LaSalle Street, serving the San Marco neighborhood
- South Mandarin – San Jose Blvd., near the St. John's County border
- University Park – University Blvd. North, serving the Arlington area, including Jacksonville University
- West – Chaffee Road, serving the Westside
- Westbrook – Commonwealth Avenue, serving the urban core
- Willow Branch – Park St., serving the Riverside and Avondale areas

=== Bookmobile ===
Jacksonville was the first library in Florida to offer a mobile library service, established in 1928. For over 75 years, the Jacksonville Public Library continued this service of providing accessible materials to rural residents and areas where a branch had not been established. However, due to funding cuts, the bookmobile was discontinued as of October 2005.

After the discontinuation of the bookmobile service, the library looked for ways to continue servicing the area where the mobile branch had been primarily operating. In 2012, the library opened the Oceanway Express location to provide limited service to patrons who have no geographically close library branch. The pickup/drop-off service is located near the Oceanway Community Center in northwest Jacksonville.

== Funding and administration ==
As a branch of the city government, the system is funded by local taxes. The system also receives aid supplemental funds from various grants.

The Jacksonville Public Library is one of the few departments of the city government to be administered by an independent board. The Board of Trustees comprises volunteers who service as the policy and planning body for the Jacksonville Public Library System. There are 12 voting members and at least two non-voting members who service in an ex officio capacity. Non-voting members are the city council president or a designee and up to one additional council member, and the superintendent of schools or a designee. Trustees are appointed by the Mayor of Jacksonville and approved by the City Council. Board members serve for four years, and may serve a second consecutive term if reappointed. The board approves library policies, submits an annual budget request, oversees the operation of the system and hires the library director.

Barbara A.B. Gubbin served as director from 2005 to June 30, 2017. She was succeeded by Tim Rogers, who began serving as director on January 29, 2018.

== Borrowing policies ==
Patrons of the Jacksonville Public Library may borrow books, most magazines, "zines", videos (VHS or DVD) and audio materials. Patrons may check out 100 items at a time, with a 20-item limit on DVDs. Most items, except for express books and DVDs (seven-day checkout), are a three-week checkout period.

In July 2020, the library eliminated fines for a six-month trial period. As of July 1, 2021 the change was made permanent. After an item is overdue for nine weeks, patrons will be sent to a collections agency which will contact them to retrieve the items. If the items are returned, their costs and processing fees are removed from the patron's account. The only bill that cannot be removed is the collections agency's $10 fee. Fees totaling $10 or more will result in a block to the user's account. A fine balance of $9.99 or less is considered a library account in good standing.

All materials borrowed from the library can be returned to any branch, regardless of where they were borrowed. Patrons can place up to 50 holds on library materials. These materials are held for seven days after the patron is notified of their availability.

Jacksonville Public Library cards are free for residents of Duval County, including Baldwin and the Beaches communities, and non-residents employed by a city/county agency or who own businesses or property in the county. Other non-residents may apply for a card for $175 for one year. Hardship waivers are available upon request. Lost cards may be replaced for a $2 fee. Children under the age of 18 can apply for a card with parental permission. Parents are responsible for all items checked out on the child's card.

A partnership between Jacksonville Public Library and Duval County Public Schools allows all Duval County Public School students (K-12) a library privilege known as a "Student Card." No physical card is issued for this privilege; the student uses his or her school ID card to check out up to three books (print or audio) and use the library computers. No fines or fees are assessed with use of the Student Card.

As of 2011, the Jacksonville Public Library offers e-book checkout for patrons through Libby by Overdrive. This allows cardholders to place holds and read e-books and audiobooks. The checkout period is three weeks for e-books, and two weeks for audiobooks. Through Libby, a patron can have ten borrowed titles at a time and ten holds at a time, with no monthly limits.

== History ==
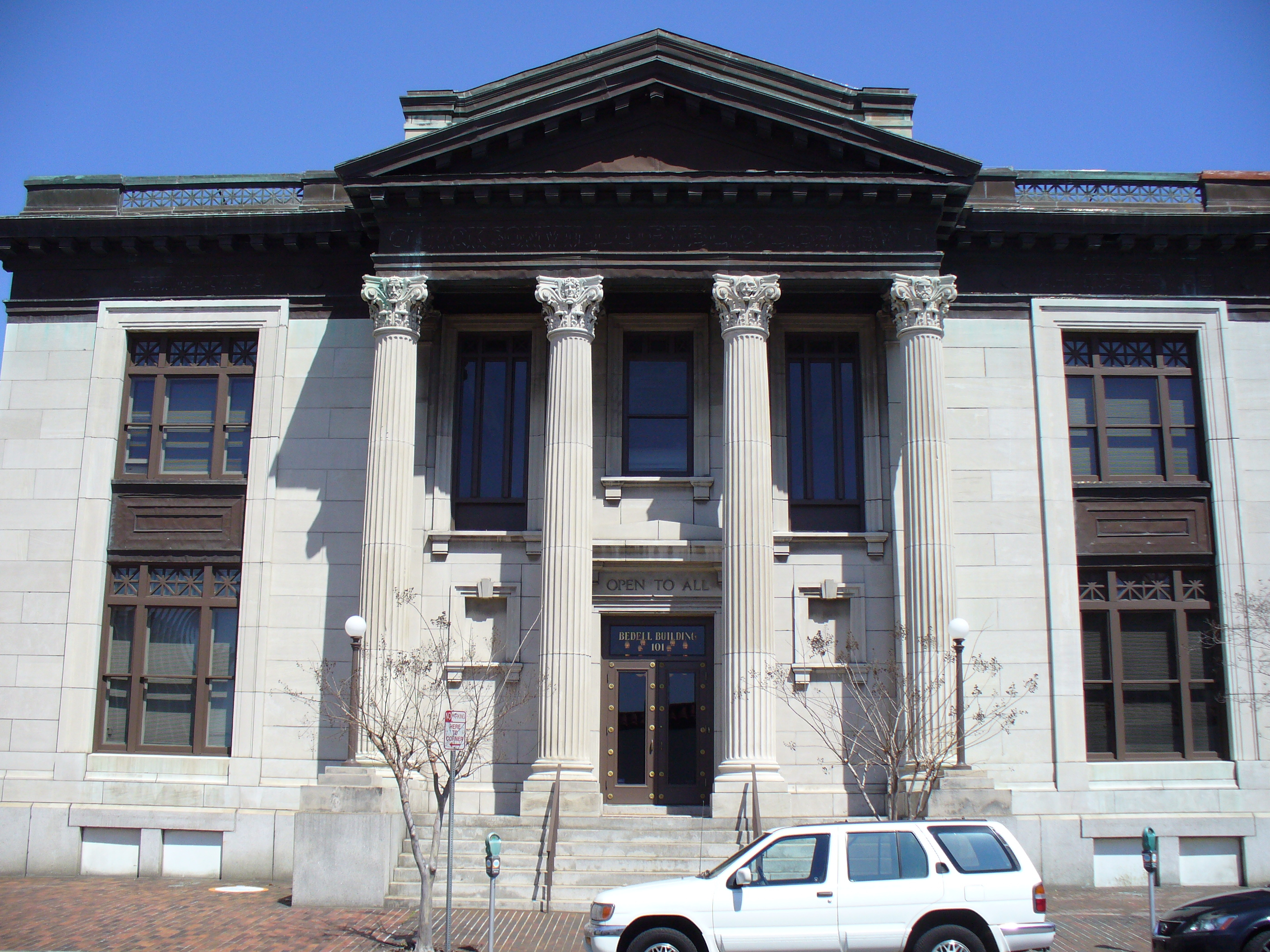
Carnegie Library, Jacksonville, FL (2010)

The Jacksonville Public Library had its beginnings when May Moore and Florence Murphy started the Jacksonville Library and Literary Association in 1878. The association was populated by various prominent Jacksonville residents and sought to create a free public library and reading room for the city.

Moore and Murphy's association succeeded in establishing their free public reading room, Jacksonville's first, in the winter of 1878–1879. It was located in the Astor Building, on the corner of Bay and Hogan, and was overseen by librarian James Douglas. In 1883, the Jacksonville Library and Literary Association was reorganized and renamed the Jacksonville Library Association. The new association built Jacksonville's first public library building, described as "a neat one-story frame building having a steep roof and a small entrance porch in front facing Adams Street."

This was replaced in 1894 by a new building that the association shared with the Board of Trade and the Elks Club. This building, on the northeast corner of Main and Adams, housed Jacksonville's public library until 1901, when it was destroyed in a fire May 3.

=== Carnegie Library ===
- Old Jacksonville Free Public Library
- U.S. National Register of Historic Places
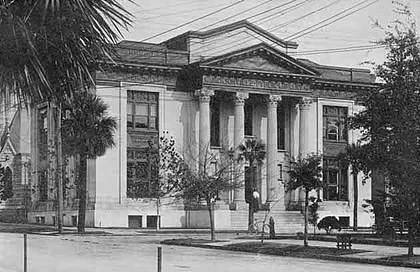
- Postcard featuring the Carnegie Library, ca. 1910.

- Location within Florida Location within the United States
- Location: 101 East Adams Street, Jacksonville
- Coordinates: 30.32762°N 81.65602°W
- Built: 1903–1905
- Architect: Henry John Klutho
- Architectural style: Classical Revival
- NRHP reference No.: 86003679
- Added to NRHP: January 22, 1987

Help for rebuilding came in 1902 in the form of Andrew Carnegie, who offered $50,000 for a new library, provided that the city had a building site and appropriated at least $5,000 a year for library support. Between 1883 and 1929, Carnegie funded 2,509 libraries in the United States and Europe.

Carnegie believed cultural organizations, such as libraries, helped raise up the working class. He never provided total funding for any project; he believed local authorities should make their own effort and demonstrate the self-determination to which he attributed his own spectacular success. The strings attached to the Carnegie gift were that the community would provide the site, and that the elected officials—the local government—promise to pay to staff and maintain the library, guaranteeing to spend annually at least 10 percent of the amount of the original Carnegie gift. The community was required to draw from public funds to run the library—not use only private donations. Carnegie wanted these libraries to be part of the fabric of public life and the responsibility of the community. Only those determined to sustain them and make them grow would receive a Carnegie gift.

Jacksonville agreed, and the city council put the issue to local voters in 1902. It narrowly passed, 640 to 627. In January 1903 the city passed an ordinance establishing a free public library, and the city council appointed a public library board of nine men, led by Duncan Fletcher.

The building was designed by New York City architect Henry John Klutho. Klutho rebuilt Jacksonville after the Great Fire of 1901. His style of architecture is known as the Prairie School. Although his work was influenced by that of Frank Lloyd Wright and Louis H. Sullivan, it was his own.

On October 3, 1903, ground was broken for the Carnegie library on the northeast corner of Adams and Ocean. Two years later, on June 1, 1905, the library was formally opened with George Burwell Utley as librarian and with 8,685 books available. Known officially as the Jacksonville Free Public Library, it was the beginning of the Jacksonville Public Library. It was also the first tax-supported library in Florida. On January 22, 1987, it was added to the US National Register of Historic Places.

The library was two stories tall, made of limestone and copper. Its design was Classic Revival Greek Ionic, typical of Carnegie libraries, and featured four columns on the facade. Many Carnegie libraries were built in this Neoclassical style with imposing pillars and a tidy lawn, conveying reverence for the printed word. It has been described as nearly fireproof, with wood only in the floors, doors and sash.

Today the Carnegie library building houses a law firm, and is known as the Bedell Building.

=== Growth and expansion ===
In 1907, George Utley said that the library was "fast becoming securely established as a part of the municipal fabric, and is considered more and more a necessity and less and less a luxury by the citizens of Jacksonville."

By 1910, the library was outgrowing itself. The library made use of deposit stations and sub-branches, but space in the Carnegie building became an increasingly rare commodity. Thus, in the 1920s a branch system was inaugurated which continues to flourish to this day.

The first branch, the Wilder Park Library, opened November 14, 1927, on the corner of Lee and Third street for service to the African American community. This was followed by a bookmobile service on October 30, 1928. Branches continued to open, renovate and modernize, resulting in the current library system of a main library and 20 additional branches. The original branch library was replaced on June 22, 1965, with the Graham Branch Library. The first large regional library was the Regency Square branch, which opened in 1973. Six new regional branches were built throughout the city in the 1970s–1990s. In 1999 the original regional branch, Regency Square, reopened after undergoing a two-year renovation.

=== Recession and revival ===
Haydon Burns Library (1965–2005), ca. 1968.

In the 1950s, public interest in the libraries faded, along with adequate budget support. Lack of funding led to low book stocks, poorly trained staff and poorly maintained buildings. As librarian Joseph F. Marron stated in an annual report, "Impending institutional bankruptcy was a phrase being applied to this first tax-supported public library in the state of Florida."

However, when the city commission and city council approved a 19% increase in the libraries' operational budget for 1957, the Jacksonville Public Libraries began to revive. The Friends of the Jacksonville Public Library group, formed in 1956 with the intent of inspiring interest in libraries, is credited as a major influence in bringing about the increased budget.

In March 1960, the city approved a location for the new main library, the site of old City Hall, along with 60 additional feet of property previously occupied by the Windle Hotel. In March 1964, ground was broken at 122 North Ocean Street. On November 28, 1965, the new building was dedicated, and the next day opened to the public.

The main library was named after W. Haydon Burns, mayor of Jacksonville for 15 years as well as governor of Florida. The structure was designed to be both aesthetic and useful. The library featured bright green tile and concrete fins on the exterior. One newspaper reporter described it as "the ultramodern showplace is a symphony of color, texture and functional design."

After nearly 30 years of operation, the Haydon Burns building was showing its age. Due to space and wiring limitations, the building was inadequate for the needs of the growing Jacksonville community. In September 2000, the citizens of Jacksonville voted for the Better Jacksonville Plan, which provided funding for a new main library building, six new regional branch libraries and improvements at most existing branches. After closing, the city was preparing to sell the former library to the Atkins Group for $5 million. The Atkins Group planned to tear down the library to build high-rise condominiums. This was met with backlash, as preservationists and citizens wanted to save the unique 1960s piece of architecture. In 2008, the Haydon Burns Library was designated as a historical landmark. As of 2015, the building houses the Jessie Ball duPont Center and still has its famous green tile and concrete fins.

=== 21st century ===
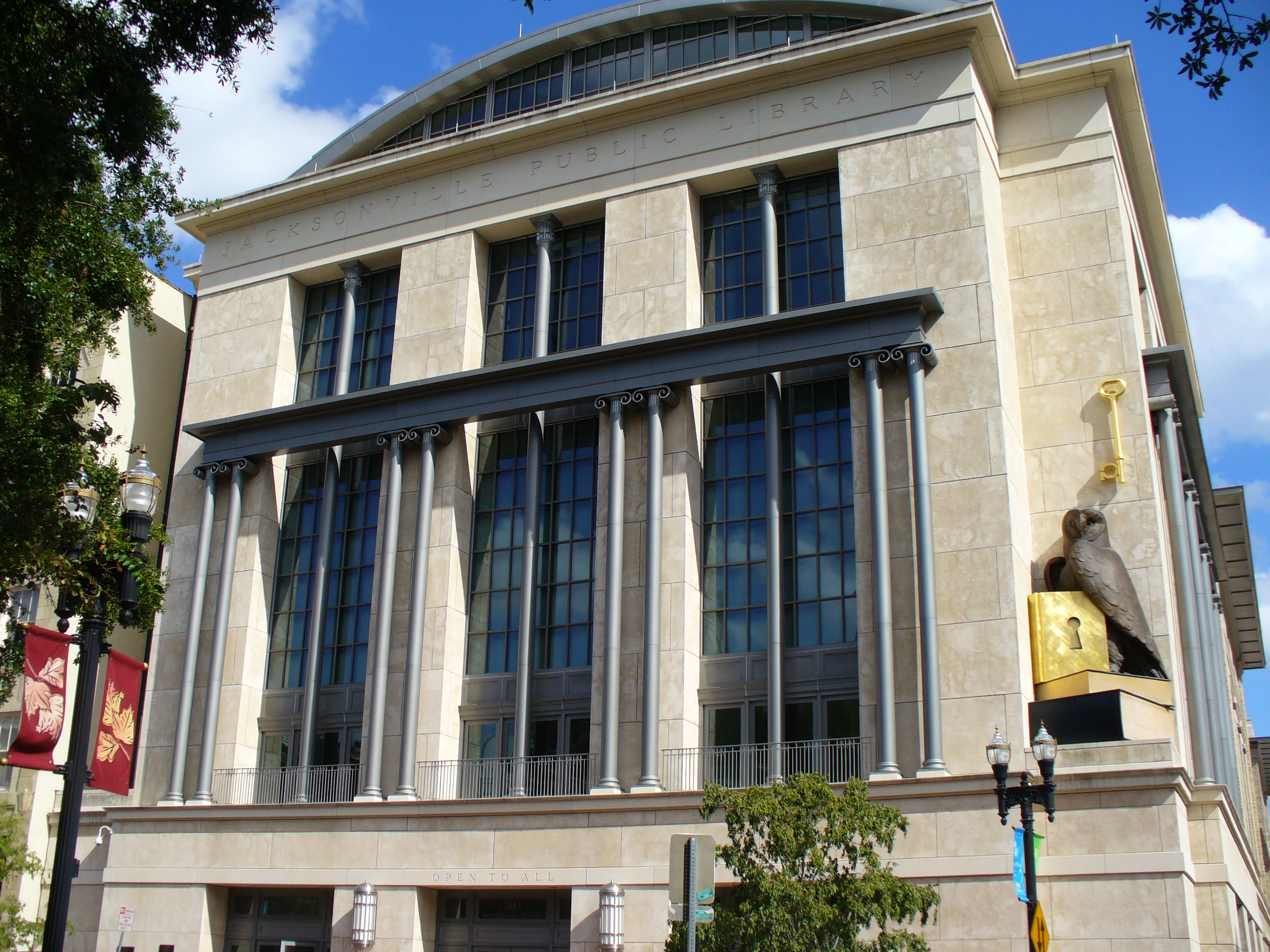
Jacksonville Main Library – Downtown

After suffering delays due to the 2004 hurricane season and contractors' difficulties, the system prepared for the opening of a new main library in late 2005. In September 2005, the Haydon Burns library closed its doors for the last time to allow staff to move to the new main library, due to open later that year. Accompanied by a week-long promotion and a full day of parades and other events, on November 12, 2005, the new main library opened to the public. The opening was a historic event for the library system and the City of Jacksonville, marking the completion of an unprecedented period of growth under the Better Jacksonville Plan. It adds to the city's architectural and cultural landscape and provides a gathering place downtown for the community. The new Main Library offers specialized reading rooms, public access to hundreds of computers and an extensive collection of books and other materials.

== Collection and services ==
The current collection includes more than three million books, audiobooks, compact discs, videos, DVDs, magazines, newspapers, and other items. Reference materials provide resources for the educational, recreational, and professional needs of the community.

There are many services and programs for children, teenagers, and adults. In the 2021 fiscal year, the Jacksonville Public Library had 1,465,833 visitors and 4,361 hours spent in programs by patrons. Circulation of library materials in the 2021 fiscal year was 3,779,614.

The main library houses a number of special collections, including the Delius Collection, Genealogy Collection, Florida Collection, partial federal government documents depository library, and Foundation Center (Grants Resource Center). The opening of the new main library in 2005 made two new special collections available — the African American Collection and the Ansbacher Map Collection. The Lewis Ansbacher Map Collection, displayed in the Ansbacher Map Room, holds over 240 antique maps from around the world, with a special focus on Florida. The Ansbacher Map Room also has a sub-collection, the Le Moyne-De Bry Collection, which contains 43 engravings from 1591 on display in the Jordan and Shirley Ansbacher Gallery. The official dedication of the African-American collection was held in August 2006. Jacksonville Public Library’s Talking Books/Special Needs Library serves customers who have difficulty reading, holding or handling a regular print book because of a visual or physical disability.

Children's programs are very popular. Regularly scheduled programs include arts and crafts; preschool, school age, and family story times; and special programs held during the summer reading program.

Other community service activities include the Center for Adult Learning located in the Main Library, which is a program to promote adult literacy. Talking Books for the Blind and Physically Handicapped provides audiotapes to the disabled in the community through the National Library Service for the Blind and Physically Handicapped. The library also participates in the Mayor's Literacy Initiative—Rally Jacksonville. Some other services are books by mail, interlibrary loans, computer classes, WiFi, and English as a second language classes for patrons in Duval County.

The Jacksonville Public Library offers free access to Linkedin Learning for patrons. All that is needed to access the program is the member's library card and PIN.

Another service offered by the Main Library is the Memory Lab. Here, library patrons can scan, edit, and restore photos, slides, film, and documents or convert old VHS tapes, audio cassette tapes, and vinyl records using one of their eight digitization stations. 16mm, 8mm, and Super8 film transfer services and reel-to-reel audio decks are available by appointment.

In addition to the many programs and services offered by the Jacksonville Public Library, the main library building houses several art exhibit spaces. These include the gallery on the first floor located next to the Jax Makerspace, spaces on the second floor, and the Betty Francis Gallery on the third floor.

Past exhibitions hosted by the library have featured artwork that serves to highlight Florida's rich cultural and historical heritage. Notably, in 2018, Haight Street Rat, an original painting by world famous street artist Banksy, was on view at the Jax Makerspace. This piece was originally located on an upper wall of a three-story San Francisco bed-and-breakfast until art curator and collector, Brian Greif, paid to have it removed and arranged for the artwork, valued at an estimated $2 million, to be displayed in public spaces all around the country, free of charge. To complement this piece, Shawana Brooks, Arts and Culture Developer at the Jacksonville Public Library, curated the exhibition Writing on the Walls: Visual Literacy through Street Art Culture. The project called for local street artists to make their mark on a series of wooden panels placed outside Phoenix Art Schools in Jacksonville. This exhibition's timely arrival hit at the peak of Jacksonville's street art movement, just as the North Florida city was undergoing a massive public art initiative, funded by ArtRepublic's Community Cultural Development program.

== Website ==
The website of the Jacksonville Public Library began in 1993 with the availability of the JAXCAT online public catalog. Over the years additional features have been added, such as patrons' ability to log in to access their account information, place holds, and renew materials checked out to their account. Online subscription databases are accessible via the website, including magazine and newspaper article databases, and business, health, and literature resources. In 2013, the Jacksonville Public Library released a new online library catalog. The new catalog is paired with Amazon with a "Buy it Now" feature. Patrons who buy items through the new catalog via Amazon will help the library system earn more materials for their collection. The Biblioboard helps local authors self-publish e-books.

=== Blog ===
The Jacksonville Public Library currently runs a blog. It states, "With our blog stories, we hope to connect you with the staff and customers of our living-breathing-changing library. We’ll do our best to take you behind the scenes of the oldest information source in town and show you just how lively this centenarian really is!". The blog includes posts concerning the community, new books, library happenings, and resources available to library patrons. One feature of the blog is the Find Your Next Read section. Different lists of popular books are provided, as well as the option to have newsletters concerning popular new reads delivered through email, courtesy of NextReads. The blog is an example of the library's dedication to keeping up-to-date and providing its patrons a variety of different resources.

=== Podcast ===
The Jacksonville Public Library's website includes a link to the library's podcast, Completely Booked. Started in June 2018, the podcast discusses what is currently going on with the Jacksonville Public Library, and includes interviews "with interesting and inspiring local Jacksonville residents." There have also been podcast episodes where they interview non-local authors as well. As of December 2020, there have been around 80 episodes with audio lengths varying from thirty minutes to an hour each.
