= Taylor Hardwick =

American architect

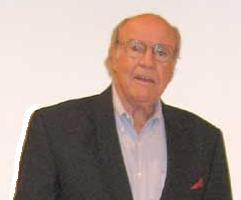
- Taylor Hardwick in 2008
- Born: July 15, 1925; Philadelphia, Pennsylvania, U.S.
- Died: September 27, 2014 (aged 89)
- Education: University of Pennsylvania
- Occupation: Architect
- Spouse(s): Louise Russell (1950-1977; divorced); Gay Leslie Mackendrick (1977-2006; her death); Jo Holland Alexander (2008- 2014; his death)
- Children: Marjory Wells (born 1953); Taylor Junior (1954-2004)
- Parent(s): Marjorie & Gordon Hardwick
- Awards: House & Home Award of Merit; Florida AIA Design Honor Award; H.J. Klutho Lifetime achievement Award
- Practice: Hardwick & Lee
- Buildings: Haydon Burns Library
- Projects: Friendship Park; The 1661 Building; The Fletcher Building

Taylor Hardwick (July 15, 1925 – September 27, 2014) was an American architect, interior designer, filmmaker, and educator who designed hundreds of buildings throughout northeast Florida, predominantly in and near the city of Jacksonville.

Hardwick's photographs have been the subject of several one-man shows and he produced fourteen 16 mm films. He taught the study of Josef Albers color theory at Jacksonville University. In 1959, Hardwick opened Jacksonville's first modern furniture showroom, The Atrium, and in 1962, he co-founded the Group Gallery, the first Contemporary art exhibition space in Jacksonville.

== Personal life and education ==
Born in 1925 and raised in suburban Philadelphia, Taylor was third of four children of Marjorie and Gordon Hardwick, an insurance executive. Taylor graduated from the Asheville School in 1943. Taylor then attended the University of Pennsylvania School of Design, where he received a bachelor's degree and Masters of Architecture in 1947. After finishing his education, he married Louise Russell. The couple had two children: Marjory Wells, born in 1953; and Taylor Junior, born in 1954. The couple divorced in 1977 and he married Gay Leslie Mackendrick in 1979. They were married until her death in 2006. In 2008 he married Jo Holland Alexander, who survives him. His son, Taylor Hardwick Jr. died in 2004.

== Career ==
Hardwick moved to Jacksonville in 1949 and spent three years working at the firm W. Kenyon Drake & Associates before opening his own architectural design practice. In 1952 he partnered with fellow architect W. Mayberry Lee to form the firm Hardwick & Lee Architects. In late 1968 the partnership was dissolved and Taylor reverted to solo practice until his retirement in 2001. W. Mayberry Lee died in 1971. During his 50-year career, Hardwick designed more than 150 custom houses, five high schools, five elementary schools and a classroom building at the University of Florida. He created dozens of commercial buildings, including the Fletcher Building in Riverside, now known as the Physicians Insurance Company. The variety of styles present in the work of Hardwick and Lee can often make it difficult to classify. In recent years the label Mid-Century modern has been applied to the work of Hardwick & Lee and many of their prominent contemporaries.

Hardwick & Lee used a variety of construction methods and visual motifs. Hardwick stated that he and his partner were always interested in innovating and consequently worked hard to avoid repeating themselves. Their work in the 1950s, primarily small residences and commercial buildings, made use of roofs pitched at very subtle angles and brick and timber wall elements arranged into patterns and grids (two residences in particular own a debt to the paintings of Piet Mondrian).

Their work from the late 1950s through the 1960s includes color as an essential element. Often in this period roofs tend to dip and zigzag. In 1965 the firm completed their two largest and most important public commissions: Friendship Park and Fountain and the Haydon Burns Library.

Strong lines and vaulting angles still occurred in Hardwick's solo work in the 1970s and 1980s. More subdued color and natural wood surfaces replace the vibrant colors of the previous decade. During this period Hardwick developed design solutions for conquering the more challenging aspects Florida terrain (swamps, rivers, abundant rainfall) with several structures built on stilts and others that were designed to float.

== Major projects ==
=== Haydon Burns Library ===
Haydon Burns Library in Jacksonville, ca. 1968

When built in 1965 at a cost of $3.7 million, the Haydon Burns Library was considered state of the art. The 126,000 sq ft (12,000 m^{2}) 3-story building was designed by Hardwick. Hardwick and the building committee for the library’s trustees toured six new and significant libraries throughout the country, intending to incorporate the best ideas in library design and operation into Jacksonville’s new facility. John Hall Jacobs, a nationally known library consultant, also contributed to the design process. Mr. Hardwick worked on the library building's design over a span of five years, and his comprehensive plan specified all interior furnishings, graphics and the use of innovative, free-standing book shelves. He chose cheerful colors and limited the use of natural light. The only elements Hardwick did not specify were the mosaic tile murals, which were designed by Ann Williams.

The building served Jacksonville well, but by the mid-1990s, it was simply too small for the number of patrons using it. The Haydon Burns Library closed on September 3, 2005, and after moving to the newly constructed facility, bids were accepted for the old Burns Library building. The transfer of the building from the city to a private owner turned out to be a lengthy process. The eventual developer, Main Branch, LLC met with Hardwick and he was pleased that the exterior would remain mostly unchanged.

=== Friendship Fountain and Park ===
The original Friendship Fountain and Park

Friendship Fountain on the Southbank Riverwalk is one of Jacksonville, Floridas most recognizable and popular attractions. Begun in 1963 and opened in March 1965, the fountain was billed as the "World's Tallest and Largest" and became a popular tourist attraction. The entire 14-acre (57,000 m^{2}) park and fountain were built for $1,750,000 on land that was donated by a group of Southside businessmen. At the time, the streams of water could be seen from virtually any location downtown and nearby Southside. The three pumps had a combined 750 horsepower (560 kW) and could push 17,000 gallons per minute; some streams were as tall as a 10-story building. The enclosure for the pumps and controls was so large that Hardwick incorporated it as a feature rather than a visual annoyance.

The fountain functioned for over 20 years before the pumps were refurbished in December 1985, and then performed another 15 years. Finally, wear and corrosion forced its closure at the end of the century. A five-month, $1,300,000 rehabilitation began when the fountain was drained in March 2001. New features were added and the fountain was a major attraction at Super Bowl XXXIX in February 2005. Two months later, two of the three original 40-year-old pumps failed and parts were no longer available. The replacement cost for the pumps was estimated at $400,000, and the city budget was tight and money was not available.

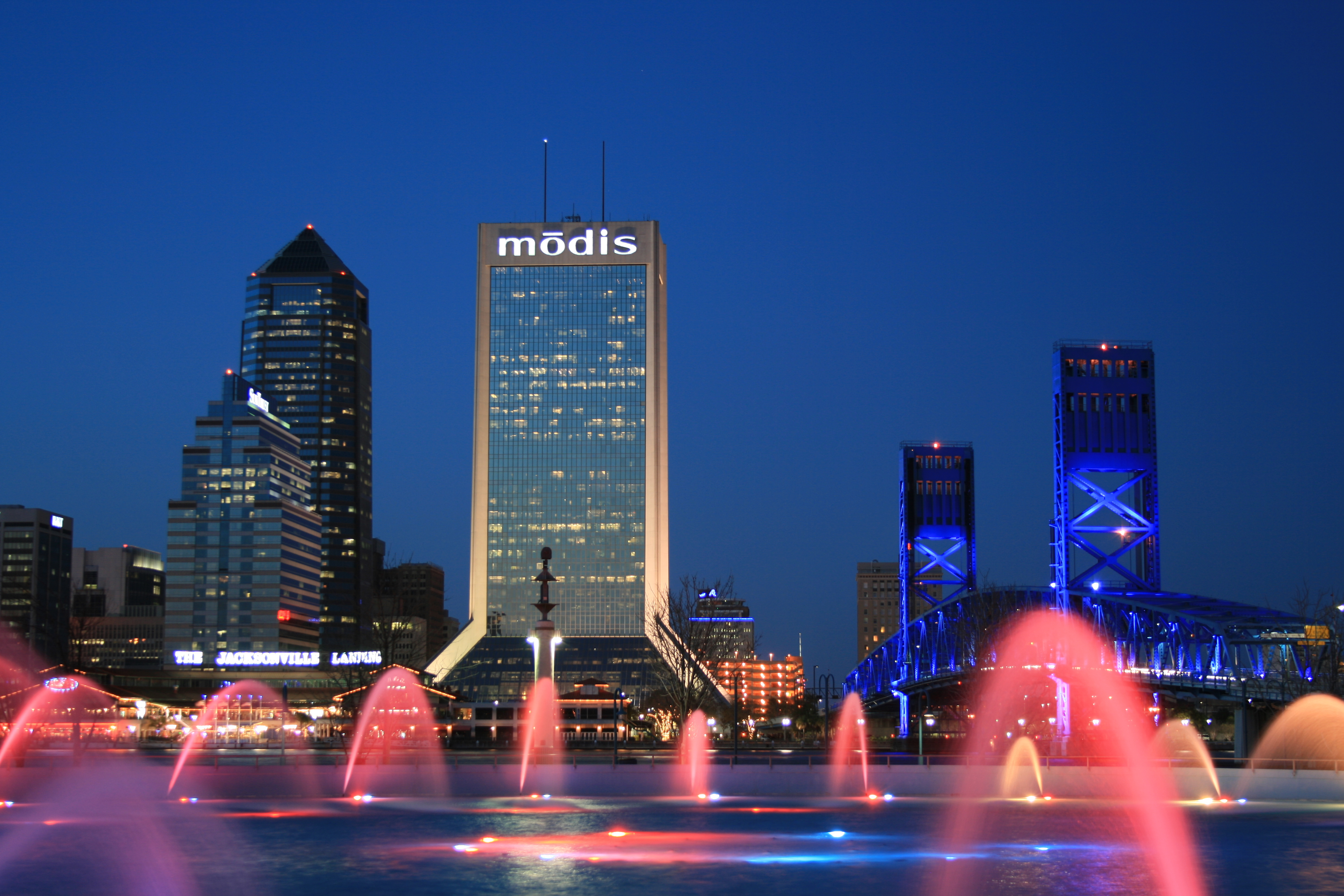
The fountain at night with one pump

The fountain has been running on one pump since then with a greatly reduced flow. The future of the Jacksonville landmark was unsure. A number of proposals were made, including moving Kids Kampus from Metropolitan Park and eliminating the fountain, rebuilding a smaller fountain, or renovating the existing fountain.

In 2011 the city decided to put their efforts into restoring Jacksonville's historic landmark and hired local commercial fountain manufacturer, Delta Fountains, to renovate the fountain. The year-long project added new features and a new light and water show.

German manufacturer Hansgrohe, a producer of high-end plumbing fixtures, featured Friendship Fountain (and architect Taylor Hardwick) in a series of print advertisements to focus worldwide attention on the need to preserve and maintain this work of art.

=== Skinner dairy ===
Hardwick designed the retail sales building for Skinner Dairy products in 1958, which were the forerunners of today's convenience stores. Skinner's Milk Houses were thoughtfully designed and visually interesting structures that eventually became an iconic presence throughout the greater Jacksonville area. Under their pitched "butterfly" roofs each identical store was painted orange and white, incorporated a drive-through feature that could be approached from two sides, and made use of aluminum sliding glass doors which were cutting edge at the time. The dairy was sold to the Suzia Foods Corporation in January 1996.

As of December 2007, 16 of the original 21 buildings still exist in one form or another, most with their distinctive roofs intact. As a testament to the enduring appeal of the structures and their form, they have proven adaptable for a variety of independent businesses. A survey of current tenants include several drive-thru restaurants and sandwich shops, car wash and detailing services, check cashing, a florist, a dry-cleaner, a coffee shop, golf instruction, and pickup-truck bed-liners. Some successful adaptations require building additions which only on rare occasions are the structures aesthetics thoughtfully considered. five are presently in such a state that could be described as being original or close to it.

== Exhibitions ==
Hardwick and his contributions to architecture in Florida were celebrated in the exhibition "Taylor Hardwick: 50 Years of Design" at the University of North Florida from June 26 – July 25, 2003. Two lectures accompanied the exhibition.

An architectural conference was held on February 2, 2008, at the Cummer Museum of Art and Gardens entitled, Mid-Century Modern: Exploring Mid-Century Modern Architecture in Florida. The program looked back at the work of architects that included Robert Broward, Hardwick, George Fisher and William Morgan in Jacksonville from 1946 to 1973.

The University of North Florida produced a 53-minute film about Hardwick and his career. It was screened at the Art @ 3 program at the Cultural Center in Ponte Vedra Beach on February 7, 2008.

== Later life ==
Hardwick retired in 2001, and worked on his memoirs at his home in Ponte Vedra Beach. He spent time lobbying for the preservation of buildings he designed that are in danger of demolition; many of his creations have been torn down or revised. His Friendship Fountain Park, unveiled on the Jacksonville riverfront in 1965, was reduced to less than half its size when a city-owned restaurant and parking lot were built in 1985.

He was unsuccessful in efforts to save the 1661 Riverside Avenue Medical Building, which was torn down to build condos in 2004. Before the demolition began, Midland Development set up a day of tribute to Hardwick's designs. On September 27, 2014, he died of cancer at the age of 89.

== Honors ==
Hardwick and his firm were the recipients of several awards including the House and Home Award of Merit in 1956, the Florida AIA Design Honor Award in 1964, and the H.J. Klutho Lifetime achievement Award in 1999. He was named an Emeritus of the American Institute of Architects.

== See also ==
- Architecture of Jacksonville
