= Jessie Ball duPont Fund =

Nonprofit organization in Jacksonville, United States

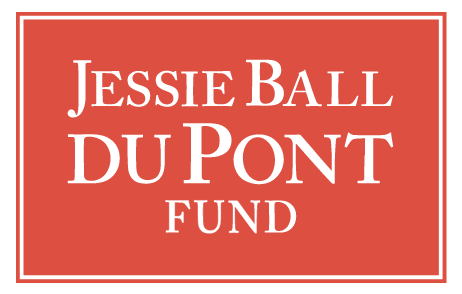
- Formation: 1970
- Type: Charitable foundation
- Headquarters: 40 E Adams Street, Suite 300, Jacksonville, Florida, US
- President: Mari Kuraishi
- Key people: Mark Walker; Chris Crothers; Sondra Fetner; Barbara Roole
- Revenue: $12,409,418 (2015)
- Expenses: $16,079,975 (2015)
- Website: www.dupontfund.org

The Jessie Ball duPont Fund, "Florida's leading national foundation", is a charitable foundation that issues grants to organizations that received support from Jessie Ball duPont between 1960 and 1964. When she died on September 26, 1970, the bulk of her estimated $42 million estate, one of the largest in Florida history, became the Jessie Ball duPont Religious, Charitable and Educational Fund.

== The beginning ==
Portrait of Jessie Ball

When Jessie Ball was a teacher in San Diego, California, she used her savings to award college scholarships to needy students, eventually managing more than 100 scholarships. After her marriage to Alfred I. duPont in 1921, she continued making charitable gifts, but on a larger scale. When her husband died in 1935, she was his primary beneficiary and became president or board member to many groups and foundations. However, she turned over most of those responsibilities to her brother, Edward Ball. She preferred to spend her time on philanthropy and let Edward handle the business dealings, which he did for the next 35 years.

Her personal generosity lasted for half a century, during which she provided scholarships for hundreds of college students (mostly in the southeast), made gifts to colleges and universities (numerous libraries were built), assisted hundreds of churches (all denominations), major charities, children's homes, historic buildings and art museums.

The Jessie Ball duPont Fund continues to assist those organizations and communities that received financial support from Jessie Ball duPont during the first half of the 1960s. The entities include names familiar to everyone, as well as groups in small towns known only to local residents. Beneficiaries include colleges and universities, churches, religious entities, schools, social service agencies, youth organizations, preservation associations, medical, cultural and civic groups. The recipients are located all over the United States.

== Fund established ==
More than six years passed between Jessie Ball duPont's death and her estate being settled. The fund was granted tax-exempt status in April 1973, but the first meeting of the trustees was not until January 1977. Those four individuals were: Edward Ball, Jessie's brother; William Mills, Jessie's charitable advisor; Rev. "Sandy" Juhan, the Episcopal Bishop's son; and Irvin Golden from Florida National Bank, the corporate executor. Hazel Williams, Jessie's personal secretary, was invited because of her knowledge of the way Jessie determined who received gifts and the amount of the gift. That first year, Miss Williams suggested 113 grants for a total of $4.2 million, which the trustees approved. One of the will's provisions specified that the clerical trustee would be appointed by the acting bishop from the Episcopal Diocese of Florida. Another rule required trustees to retire from the board at age 70.

== Current operation ==
The present Jessie Ball duPont Fund has changed significantly. In order to diversify the composition of the board, the trust received judicial permission in 2003 to increase the number of trustees to seven instead of the original four. Later that year, a Statement of Investment Policy Goals and Guidelines was formulated and adopted by the board on January 9, 2004. From 1993 to 2018, the president of the fund was Dr. Sherry P. Magill. In 2019, Mari Kuraishi was named President of the Fund, and is leading the duPont Fund to new heights. The value of the fund's assets as of 2019 was $320,347,186. A professional staff reviews and evaluates the requests from grantees and makes recommendations to the trustees, who award approximately $10 million in grants each year. However, the recipients are encouraged to be innovative and think beyond the people they normally assist. According to their website, the Fund focuses on three areas:

- Increasing equitable access to opportunities and resources for members of society who have historically been excluded
- Placemaking to build stronger communities where all voices are heard and valued
- Investing to achieve positive impact in the communities served by the Fund

Jessie Ball duPont said, "Don't call it charity. I think it is an obligation." Those who work for the fund consider it a privilege.

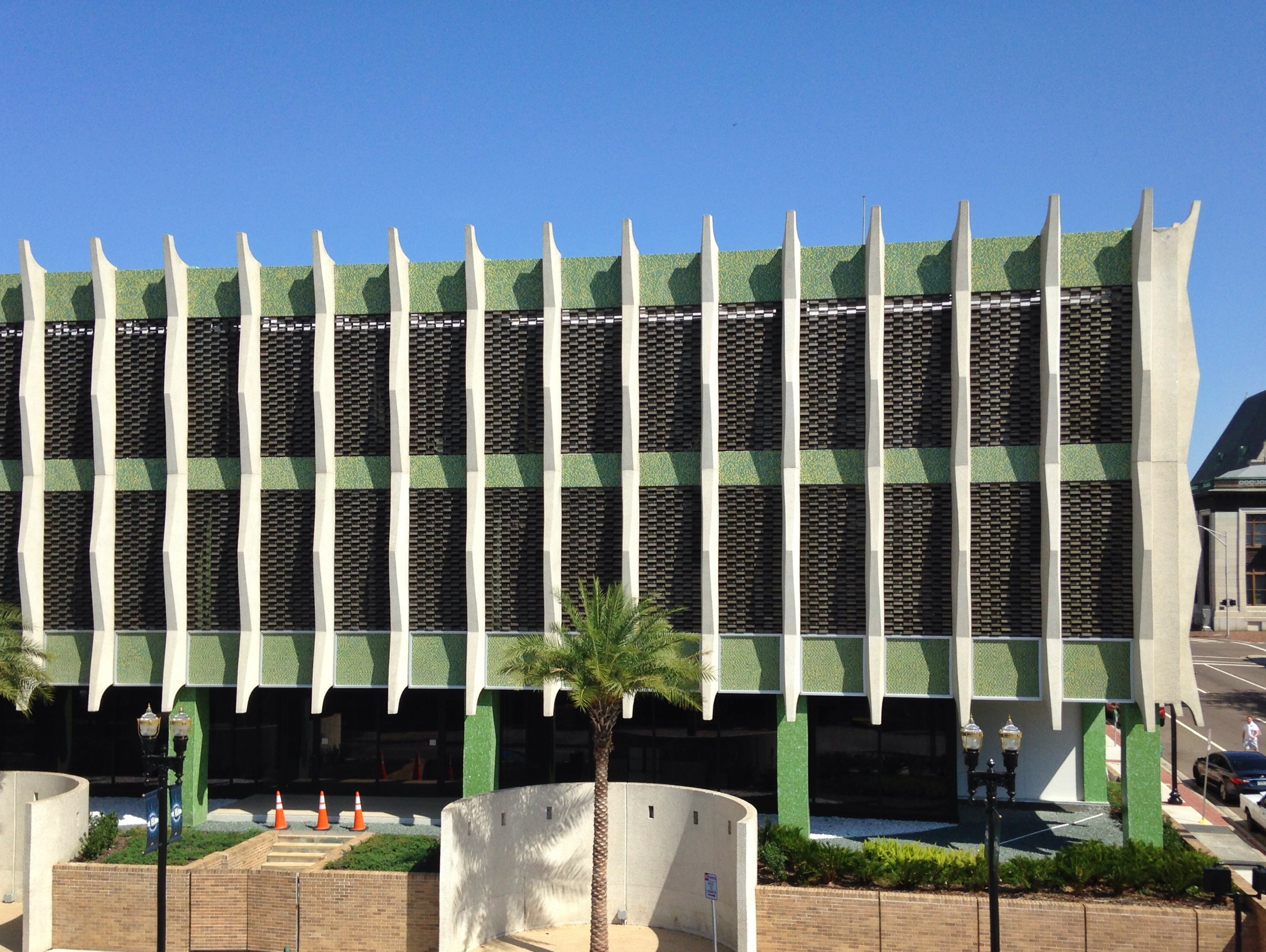
Jessie Ball duPont Center

== New corporate headquarters ==
In 2013, the Fund's offices in the Wells Fargo Center occupied 6,500 sq ft (600 m^{2}), They needed more space and there was a desperate need for reasonably priced office space for non-profit organizations. Following a 90-day due diligence period which included a building inspection and a feasibility study, the JBDF completed the purchase on June 19, 2013 for $2.2 million, $1 million less than Main Branch LLC paid six years earlier. Sherry Magill, president of the JBDF stated that the building will become a "philanthropic and nonprofit center that will be home to a variety of organizations, including the Jessie Ball duPont Fund. Collectively, these tenant organizations will benefit from the synergy created when they co-locate". Similar non-profit facilities have been established in Dallas, Texas (Center for Nonprofit Management) and Wilmington, Delaware (Community Service Building).

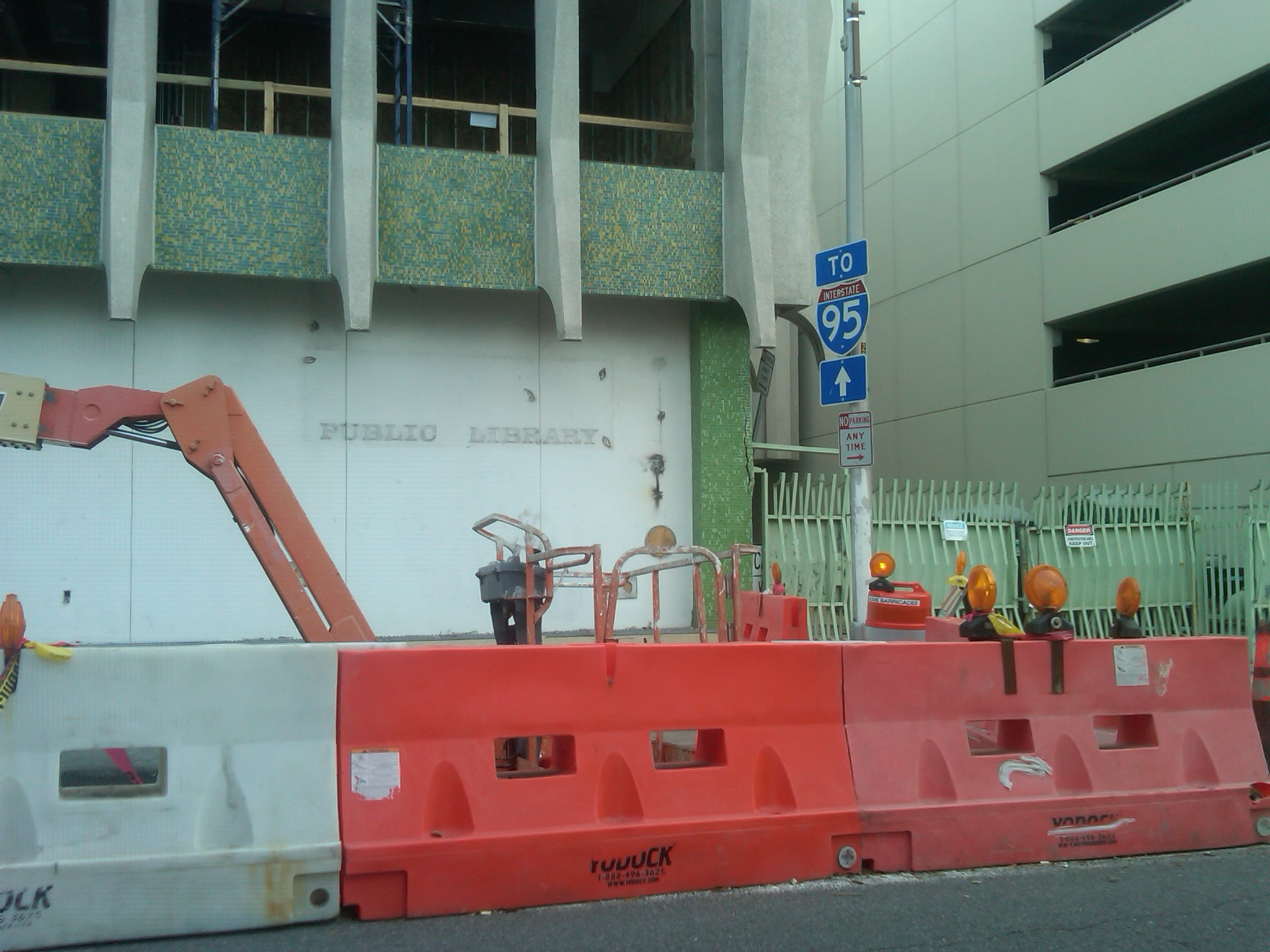
Renovation of the Haydon Burns Library in 2014

The fund formed JBDF LLC to own and operate the facility, which offered stable monthly lease amounts well below commercial rates, and savings through bulk purchasing at the center.

The JBDF required a small portion of the former library's three floors with 80,000 sq ft (7,400 m^{2}) of rentable space, not including a 33,000 sq ft (3,100 m^{2}) basement which could be used in case of a disaster. To reduce operating expenses and demonstrate the energy saving benefits of green building, the JBDF planned to include conservation features to achieve LEED certification. With a budget of $20 million, renovations were projected to require 18 months, so occupancy was not expected until late 2014 at the earliest.

In May 2014, interior gutting and cleanup neared completion, with construction expected to last less than a year. The JBDF opened the Jessie Ball duPont Center in 2015.

== Trustees ==
As of 2021, the trustees were:

- Anna Escobedo Cabral, Chair
- Elizabeth Kiss, Vice Chair
- Marty Lanahan, Trustee
- Rev. Jen Bailey, Trustee
- Willem Erwich, Trustee
- Chuck Redmond, Trustee
- Rev. Canon Dr. J. Allison DeFoor

== See also ==
- Alfred I. duPont Testamentary Trust
- Jessie Ball duPont Center
- Jessie Ball duPont
