= Skinners' Dairy =

Skinners' Dairy was a family-run dairy that existed in and around Jacksonville, Florida from 1922 until 1995.

== Origin ==
The family of Samuel Benjamin "Ben" Skinner operated a dairy farm on a portion of their vast land holdings in northeast Florida beginning in the early 1920s. During the late '50s the growing influence of grocery stores made it more difficult for small, independent dairies to remain financially solvent. The decision was made to build small freestanding "milk houses" in residential neighborhoods. These stores offered milk and other dairy products and they were ideally suited to replace the declining milk home delivery service. The first store was built in 1958 and the chain peaked in 1985 with 29 stores throughout northeastern Florida (24 in Jacksonville, 3 in Clay County and two in St. Augustine).

== Architectural design of stores ==
Created by the architectural firm of Hardwick & Lee, the Skinner's Milk Houses were present throughout the Jacksonville area. They had a distinct design with a pitched "butterfly" roof, and each identical store was painted orange, brown, and white, incorporated a drive-through that could be approached from both sides, and used aluminum sliding glass doors which were a novelty at the time. The “wings” were orange, the block walls on the ends were dark brown, the underside of the wings and block side walls incorporating the sliding doors were off-white. The overhanging roof design also provided shelter for drive-through customers during north Florida's frequent rainstorms.

== Final years ==
In 1984 Skinner's Dairy transitioned to next family generation ownership, its third, when it was purchased by H. Denny Gaultney, son-in-law of W. H. Skinner. The new management began constructing new stores in a new design in 1987. Six of the new stores in the second series were built in Duval County from 1986–1988. Three second series stores built in 1987 are in Clay County.

From the late 1980s to mid-1990s the company concentrated on the wholesale side of the fluid milk business expanding distribution statewide, and to lower southeastern states and the Caribbean.

The dairy was sold to Velda Farms in January 1996. The land that constituted the dairy headquarters and farm was a sizable piece of property located off Bowden Road on the city's south side. The land was redeveloped in 2000 as an office park known as The Silos, a reference to the land's previous appearance and function.

== Legacy ==
As of December 2007, 16 of the original 21 stores still existed in one form or another, housing a variety of businesses. Current tenants include several drive-thru restaurants and sandwich shops, a bakery, a florist, a dry-cleaner, a coffee shop, golf instruction, and a truck bed liner installation business.

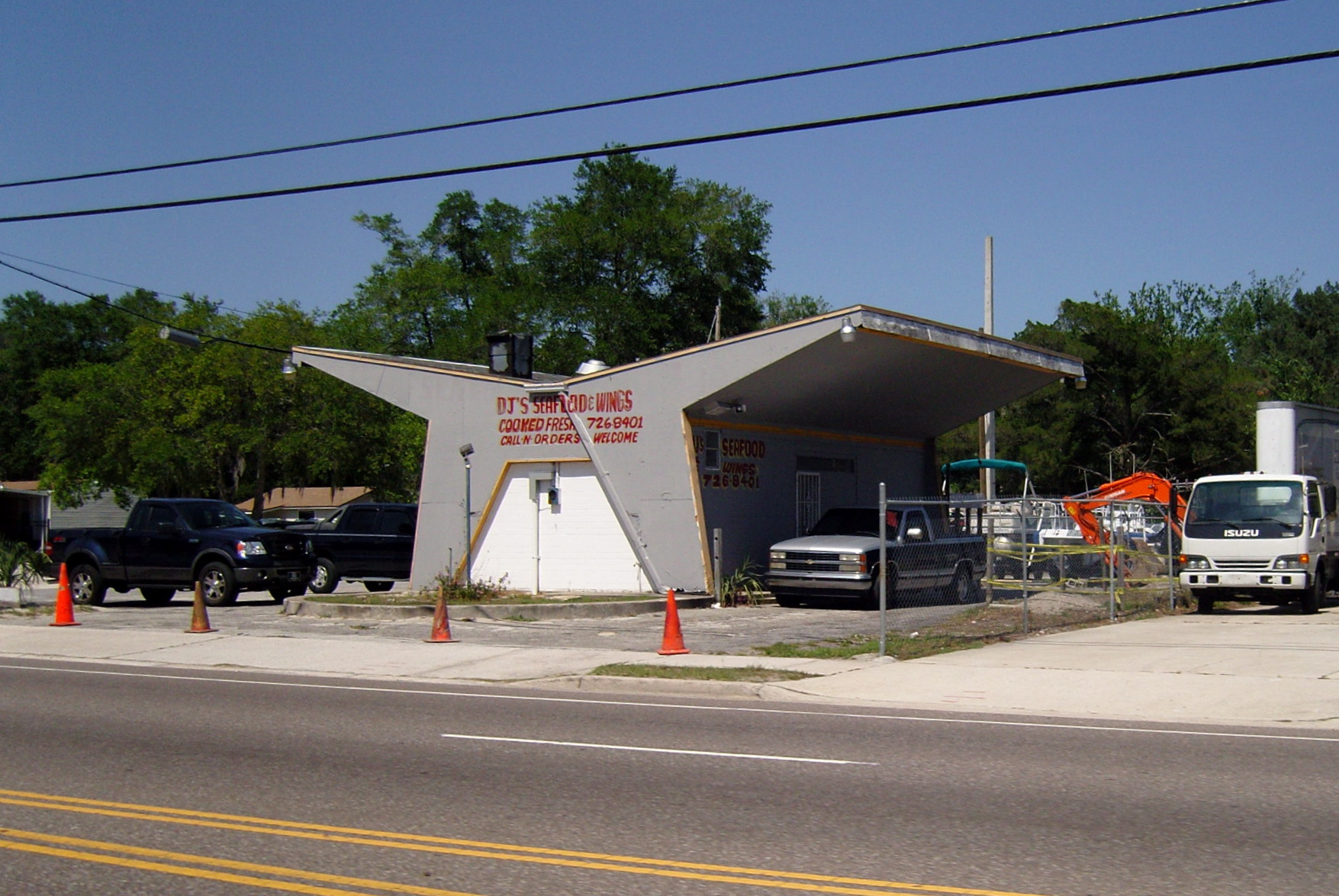
Store #16 in 2007

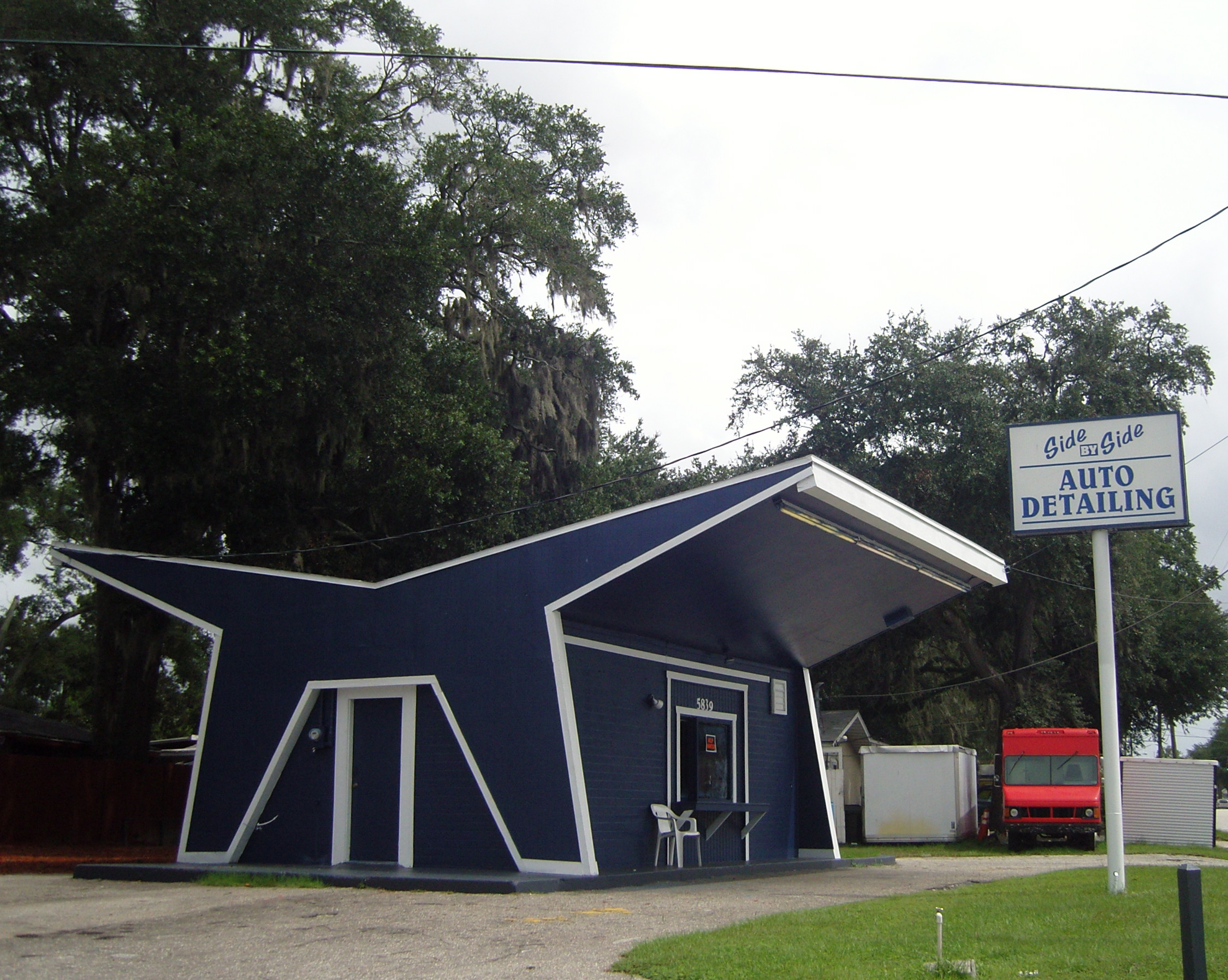
Store #3 in 2007

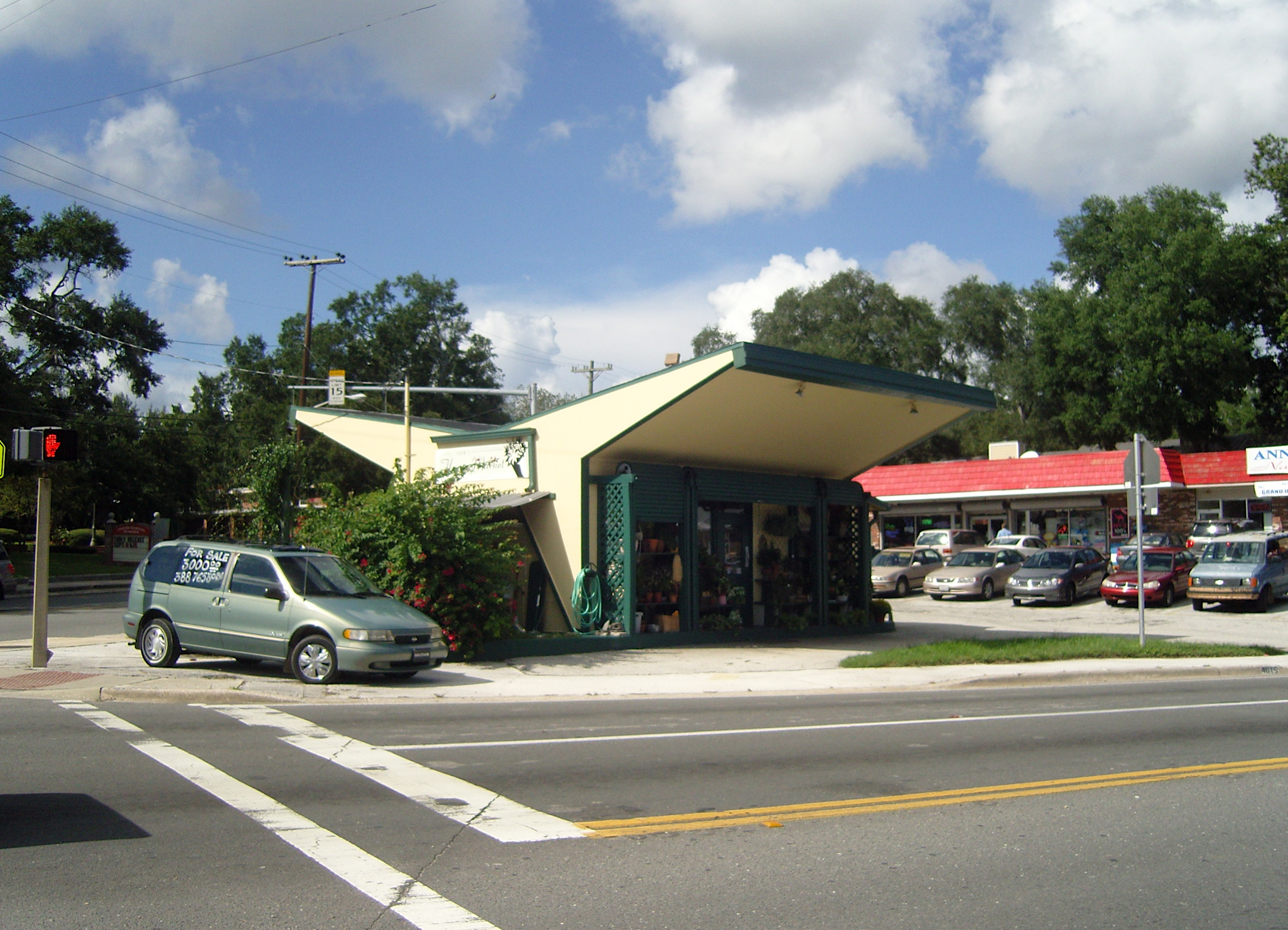
Store #6 in 2007

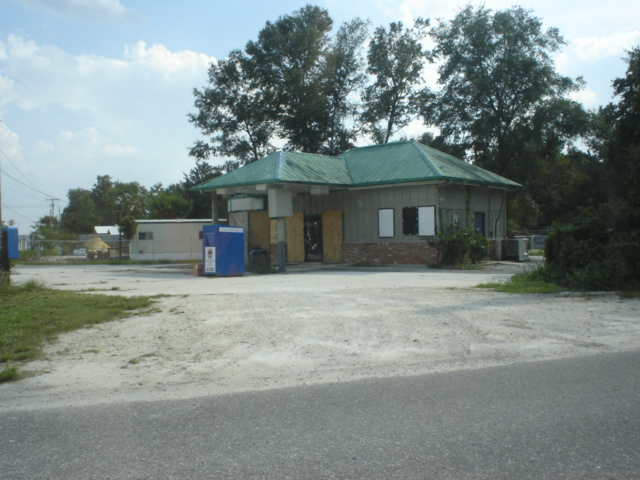
College Drive Store in 2008

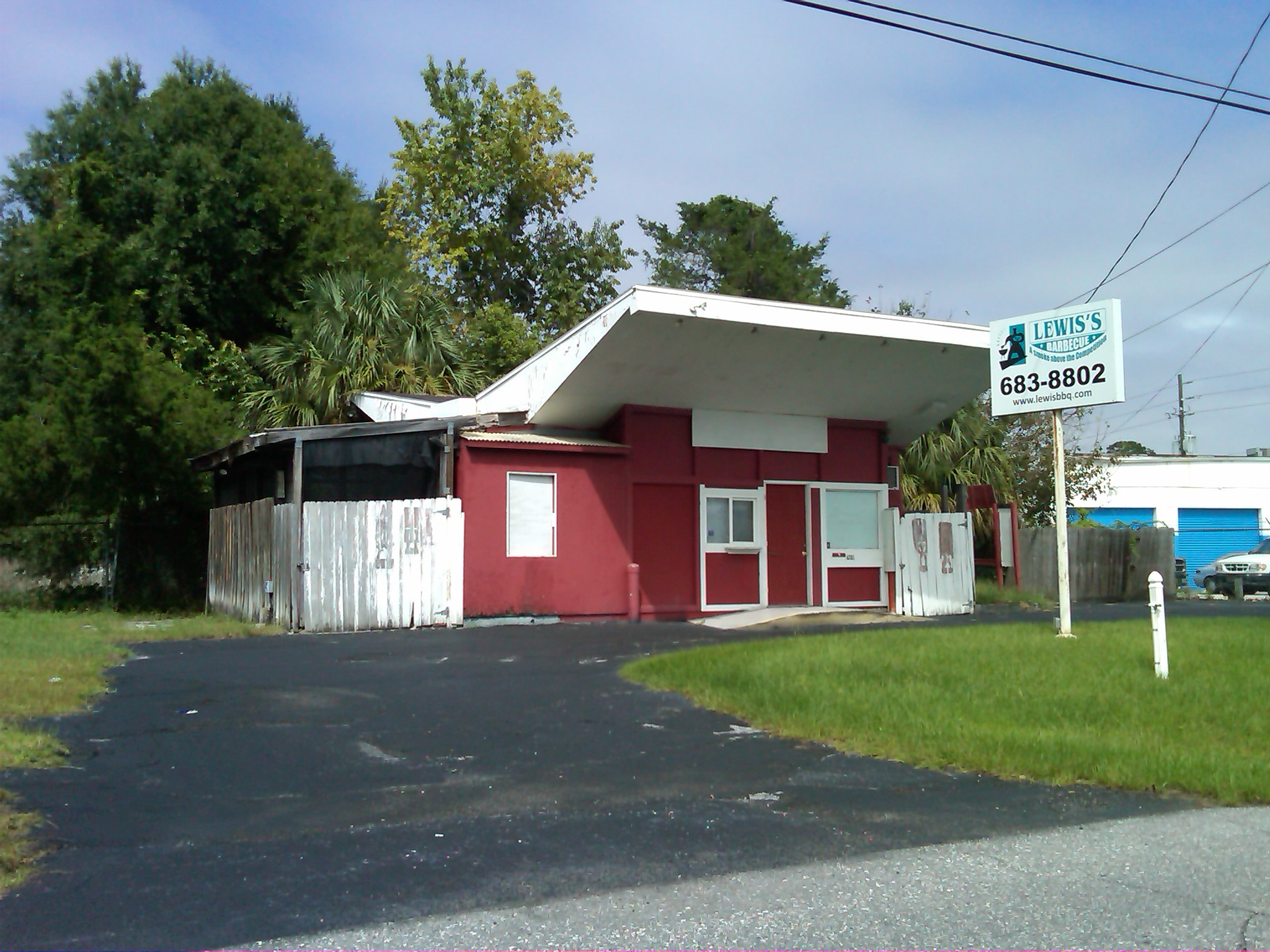
Store #11 in 2014

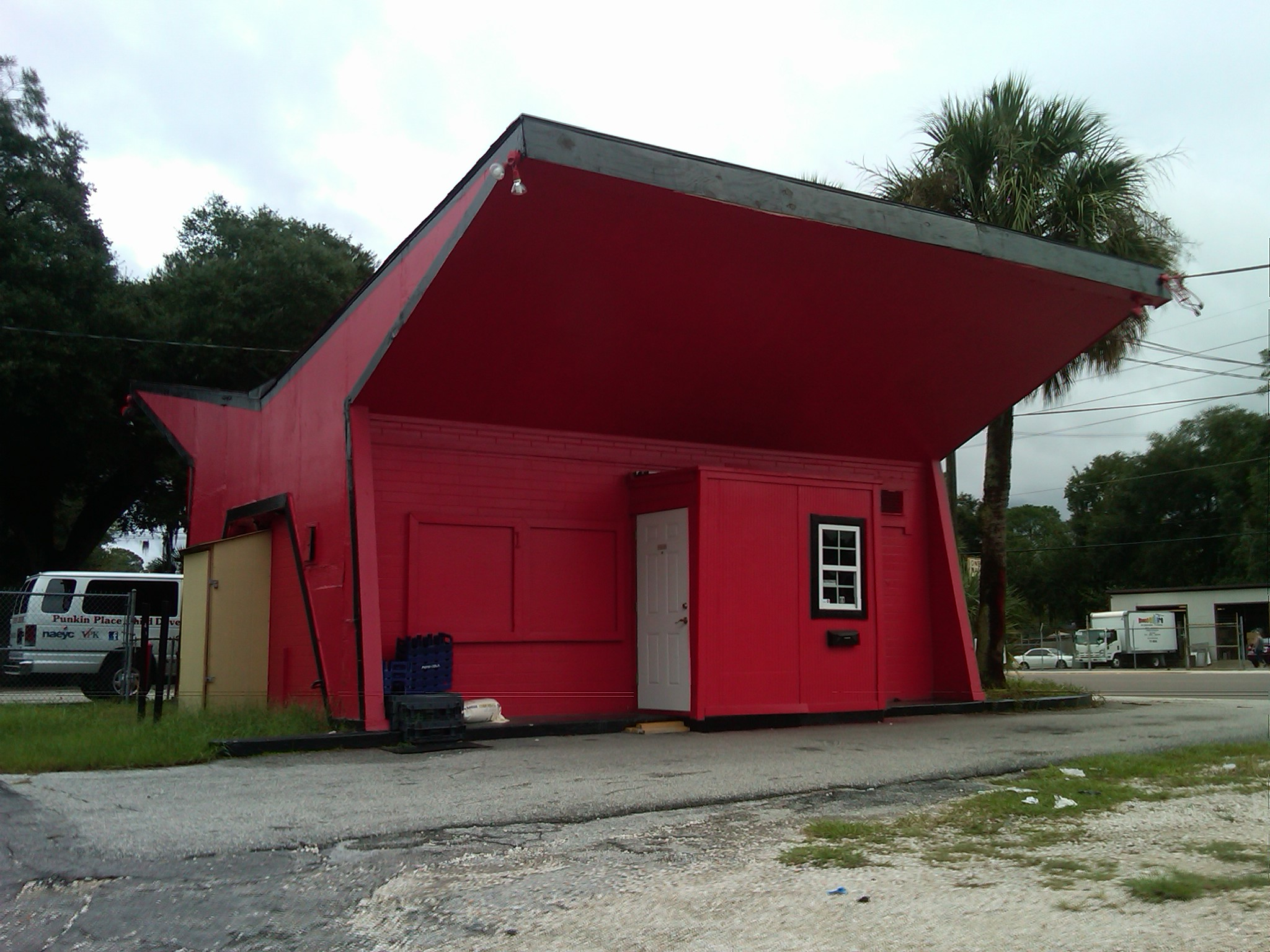
Store #13 in 2014
