= Landing (disambiguation) =

Landing is the last part of a flight, where a flying animal, aircraft, or spacecraft returns to the ground.

Landing may also refer to:

== Arts and entertainment ==
- Landing (band), an American indie rock band
- The Landing (album), by Iron Savior, 2011
- "Landing", a song by Golden Earring from the 1969 album Eight Miles High
- Landing (series), a series of arcade flight simulator video games
- Vir Das: Landing, a 2023 Indian TV series by comedian Vir Das

== Places ==
- Landing, New Jersey, U.S.
- The Landing (Antarctica), a large flat snowfield in the upper Skelton Glacier
- The Landing (Kansas City), Missouri, U.S., a shopping mall
- The Landing Historic District, in Fort Wayne, Indiana, U.S.
- The Landing in Renton, a residential and commercial development in Renton, Washington, U.S.
- Jacksonville Landing, a former marketplace and festival area in Jacksonville, Florida, U.S.

== Other uses ==
- Landing (water transport), a water terminal for river transport lines
- Landing operation, a military action
- Landing, a part of a stairway
- Landing a fish, to retrieve an angled game fish out of water

== See also ==
- Landed (disambiguation)
- Landing Creek (disambiguation)
- Landing pad (disambiguation)
- Landing zone (disambiguation)
- Crash Landing (disambiguation)
- Emergency Landing (disambiguation)
- Forced Landing (disambiguation)
