= Jacksonville Riverwalks =

Pedestrian walkway in Jacksonville, Florida

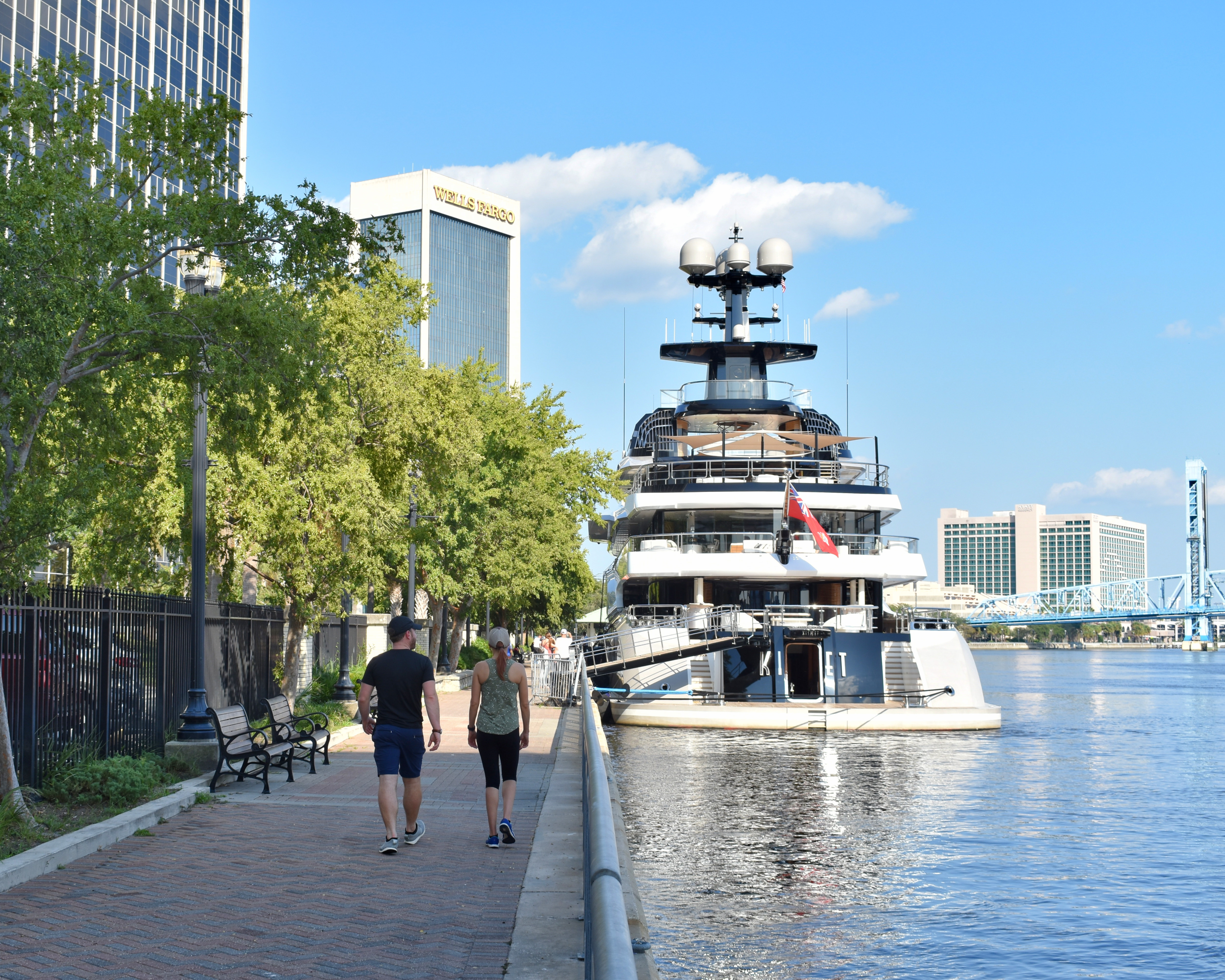
- A section of Jacksonville's Riverwalk along the St. Johns River and Riverfront Plaza
- Interactive map of Jacksonville Riverwalks
- Coordinates: 30.319525°N 81.659901°W
- Established: 1985
- Open: Year round
- Website: Northbank Riverwalk; Southbank Riverwalk

The Jacksonville Riverwalks are a network of multi-use trails and open space developments along both the north and south banks of the St. Johns River in Jacksonville, Florida. The roughly 2-mile (3.2 km) Downtown Northbank portion travels alongside the Hyatt Regency Jacksonville, Riverfront Plaza, Times-Union Center for the Performing Arts, CSX Transportation Building, and extends into the Brooklyn district. The 1.25-mile (2.01 km) Southbank portion of the trail connects local landmarks such as Friendship Fountain, Museum of Science and History and Riverplace Tower.

== History ==
=== Southbank ===
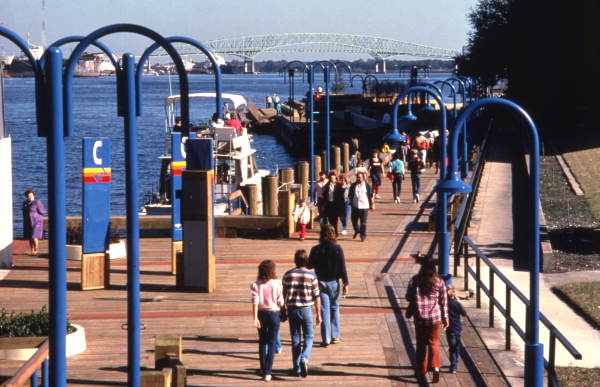
Southbank Riverwalk in 1986.

The first section of the Riverwalk opened on the Downtown Southbank on November 8, 1985. It was intended as a venue where tourists and local residents alike could view the beauty of the river and the skyline of the city. On a sunny day, the view from the walk includes shimmering water, shiny buildings, sailboats and speedboats. The 1.2-mile (1.9 km) walk was designed by Perkins & Perkins Architects to be a festive waterfront public space linking Friendship Fountain and Harbormasters Restaurant (now River City Brewing Co.) with hotels and office buildings east of the Main Street Bridge. Friendship Park Fountain was built in 1965 and became one of the most recognizable landmarks in the city. A graphic system was developed and, included banners, kiosks and signage to provide visitors with clear and legible information, as well as reinforce the warm and lively image of the riverwalk.

A few of the project were built but scaled back. The St. Johns Wharf was a planned open-air marketplace to be built over the river adjacent to the Wyndham Hotel. A few shops were built along the riverwalk, but the wharf was never constructed. Four open air pavilions were planned and projected to include concessions and restroom facilities. only two were constructed. The Ship Museum, an attraction to emphasize the historic relationship between the city and the river; projected to include floating ship exhibits, was scaled back to the current Jacksonville Maritime Museum, now closed. Multiple projects did not come to fruition. The Grove, a raised grass seating area shaded by a grove of palm trees; The Pyramid, an outdoor structure with terraced seating area for special events; An Aquarium located south of the maritime museum, facing Friendship Fountain, which would showcase local freshwater and saltwater marine life; A Great Lawn for recreation and relaxation; A sidewalk café under the bridge that would link both sides of riverwalk; A 3,000-seat open-air amphitheater with bandstand and theatrical lighting, built out into the river that would be used for public concerts, ballets, festivals and school graduations.

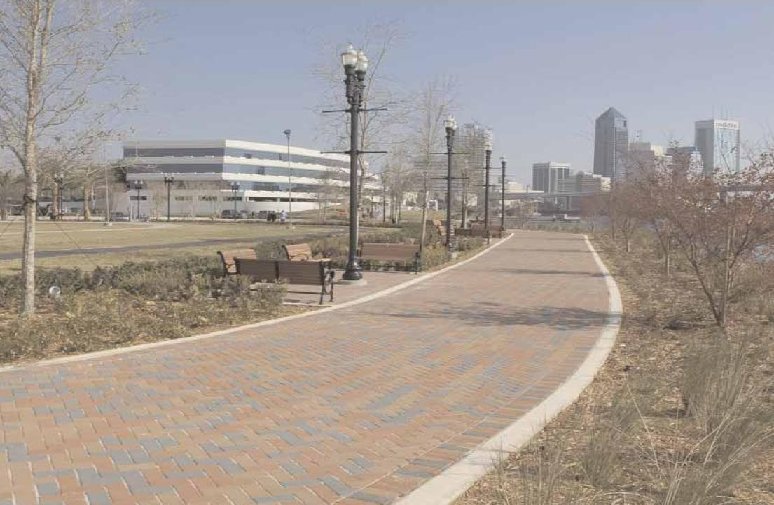
Newest section of Northbank Riverwalk

In January, 2005, a ribbon-cutting ceremony was held to celebrate the opening of the latest extension of the Northbank Riverwalk. Construction took nearly two years for the 1.5-mile (2.4 km), $8.7 million project. The landscaped brick walkway connects the existing Riverwalk at the CSX building to Riverside Avenue. Its features include historical lighting, water fountains, trash receptacles, bike racks, irrigated landscaping and over 100 benches.

Nearly 40 feet of Riverwalk was temporarily closed in late 2006 when corrosion caused steel pilings to fail and the supported walkway buckled. The city allocated $1.3 million to inspect the entire Riverwalk and make emergency repairs, and planned a multi-year capital improvement project eventually costing $25 million for upgrades split between both riverwalks. As part of that project, the city began installing 306 pile jackets in and around the area of the 2006 closure at a cost of $1.4 million.

At the January 31, 2008 meeting of the Downtown Development Review Board (DDRB) of the Jacksonville Economic Development Commission (JEDC), plans were tentatively approved for a 128-slip dockage facility to be named, The South Shore Marina & Riverwalk at the Aetna Building. The project would include a new section of southbank riverwalk on the 13-acre (53,000 m^{2}) Aetna Building property, which has 1,100 feet (340 m) of riverfrontage. Permits from the Florida Department of Environmental Protection and the United States Army Corps of Engineers had already been obtained, but financial conditions forced the project to be placed on hold.

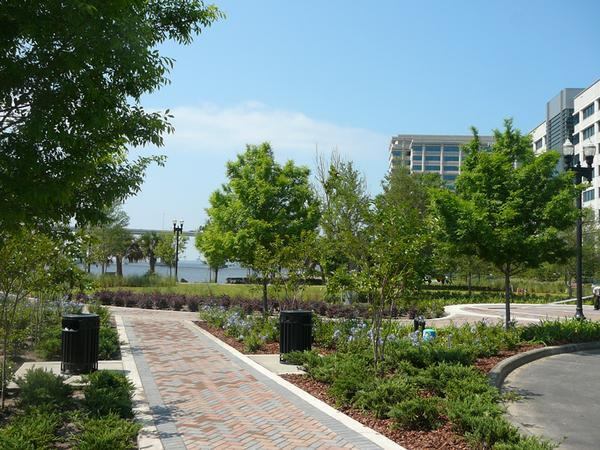
New access from Fidelity land swap

The City of Jacksonville and Fidelity National Financial executed a land swap in 2008 that added 1.3 acres (5,300 m^{2}) in exchange for the parcel of land under Riverside Avenue's historic fire station. The city has the option to move the structure before it can be demolished, and funding for that purpose is being discussed.

The Riverside Arts Market (RAM) was begun in 2008 beneath the Fuller Warren Bridge around the Northbank Riverwalk. It is open on Saturdays, 10-4 from March to December and features an eclectic mix of vendors offering arts and crafts, food and drink, fruits and vegetables and live entertainment in a family-friendly environment. Eight of the market's vendors have subsequently opened brick & mortar stores or restaurants.

In late June 2009, a 12-foot corner section of concrete walkway on the northbank collapsed due to erosion of the steel bulkhead. Another portion of the riverwalk was closed after bricks became loose when the walkway sank several inches. Repairs to both damaged areas were completed prior to the July 4th celebration and fireworks show.

A meeting was held in January, 2010 between Mayor John Peyton and several city councilmen to discuss progress on three major downtown improvement projects, including Southbank Riverwalk replacement. Legislation was filed to fund these three projects with a price tag of $23 million. $11.9 million was allocated to replace the wooden structure with a more durable material with a 40-year life span, and upgrade lighting, railing and trash receptacles. On February 9, 2010, the city council passed the three bills without debate, providing final approval for all three projects.

=== Northbank ===
The center of the Northbank Riverwalk is the Riverfront Plaza which replaced the Jacksonville Landing. There are plans to extend it west to Riverside's Memorial Park. Free parking exists under the Fuller Warren Bridge. As of late 2011, the Northbank Riverwalk ran from the Fuller Warren Bridge to the former Shipyards property at the USS Orleck Naval Museum, owned by the city of Jacksonville. The Jacksonville Fire Museum is expected to be located near there.

To the east, the Shipyards Park West is a 11.6-acre waterfront property that is one of several public spaces yet to be developed. In addition to the Riverwalk, the park should provide places to gather where people can explore nature, learn local history and heroes, enjoy a meal or fish. Construction will be phased into three parts, extending through 2028.

Next door will be the Museum of Science and History (MOSH), which closed since 2025 at its location on the Southbank near the Friendship Fountain. Construction at the new location was expected to begin in early 2026 and take 18 months to complete.

Further east is Jacksonville Jaguar owner Shad Khan's development, Four Seasons Hotel and Residences Jacksonville which should be substantially complete by June 30, 2027. The property's hotel will have 170 rooms and suites, 26 condo residences, four restaurants, multiple pools and bars.

The Marina at Metropolitan Park is expected to open summer of 2026 with 78 boat slips and floating docks. The associated riverwalk should open concurrently.

Metropolitan Park, across from the stadium, is the planned eastern terminus of the Northbank Riverwalk. In 2026, design should be finalized and construction should commence with completion in late 2027 or early 2028

== Gallery ==
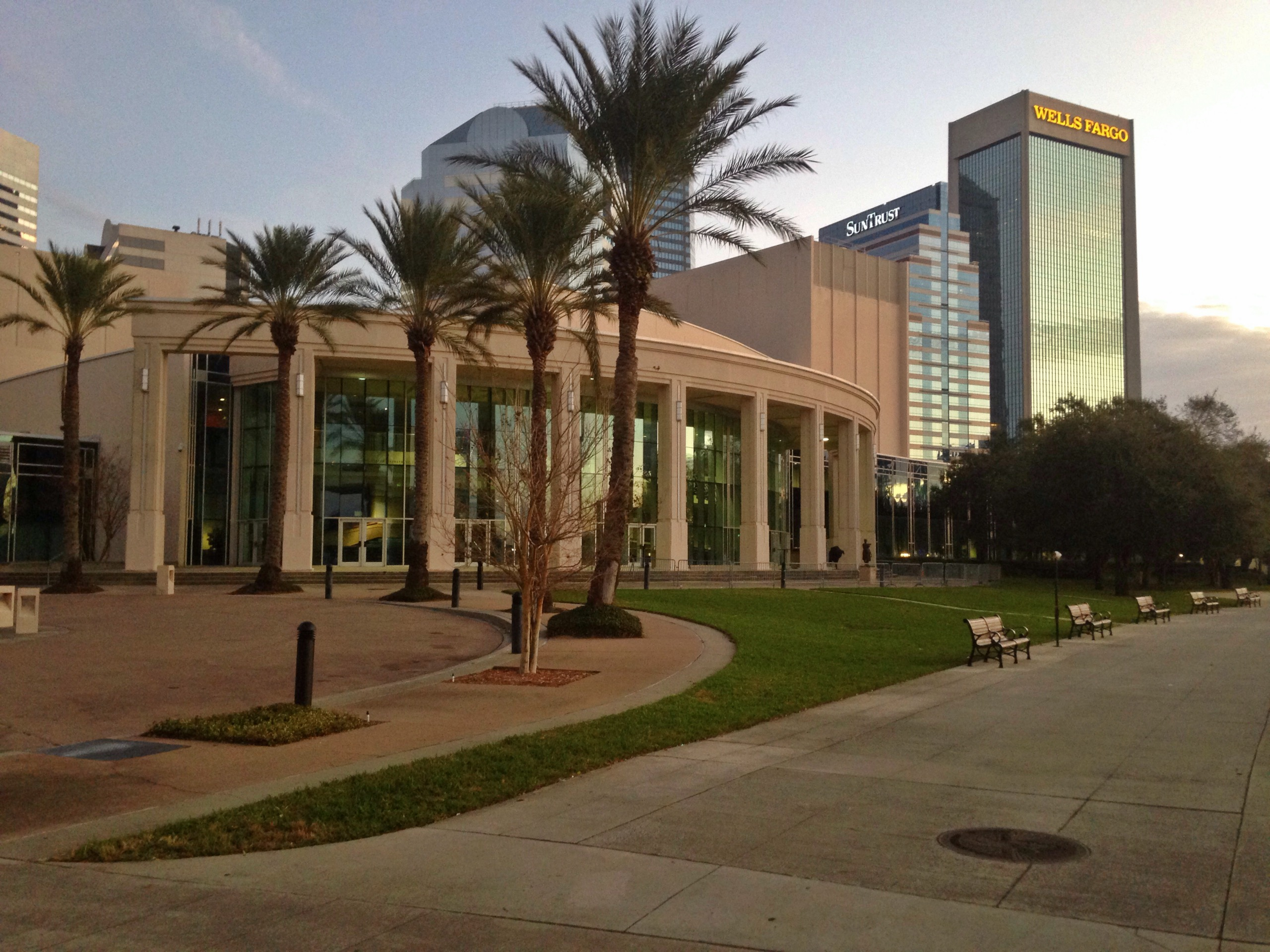
Times-Union Center for the Performing Arts, located long the Riverwalk

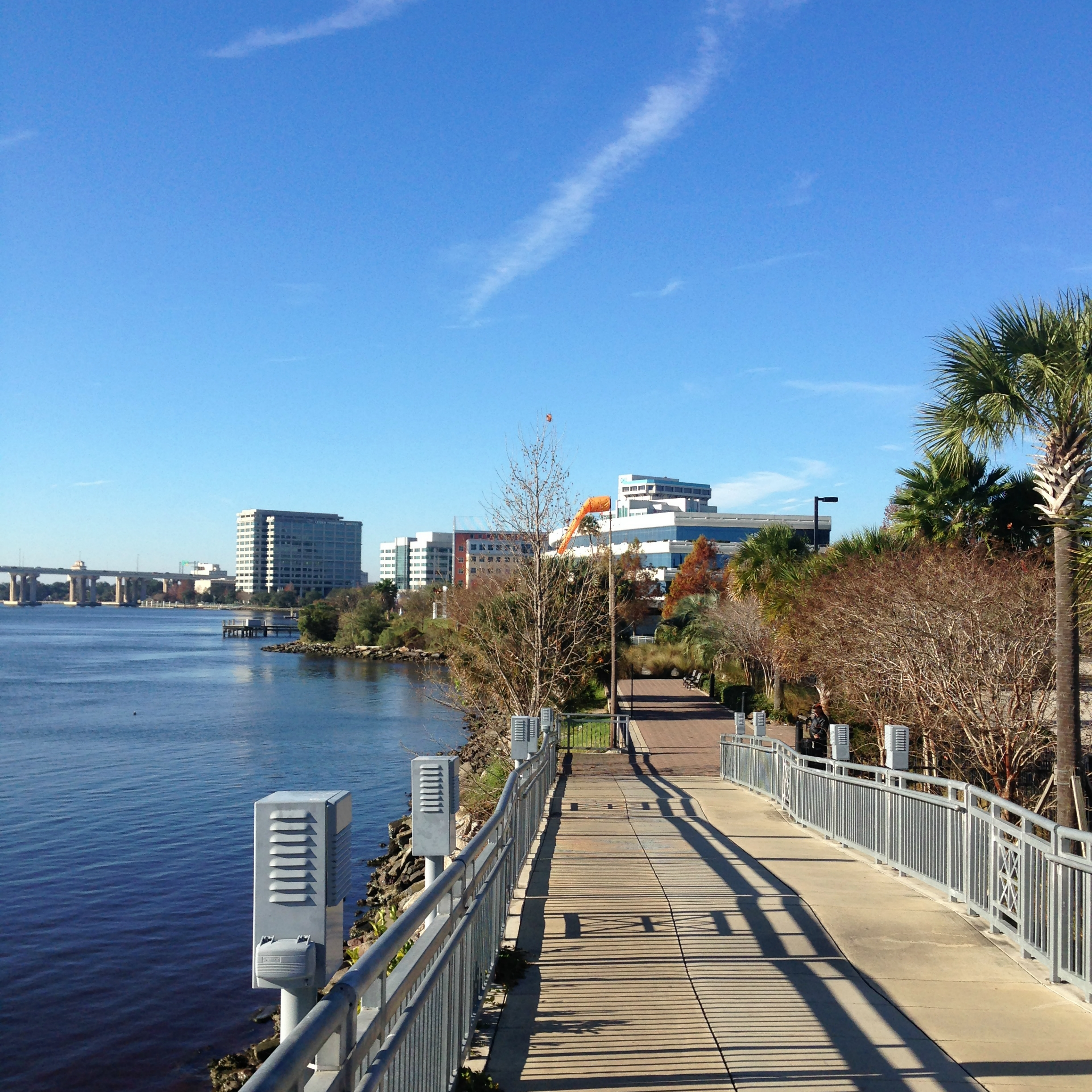
Brooklyn segment of the Riverwalk

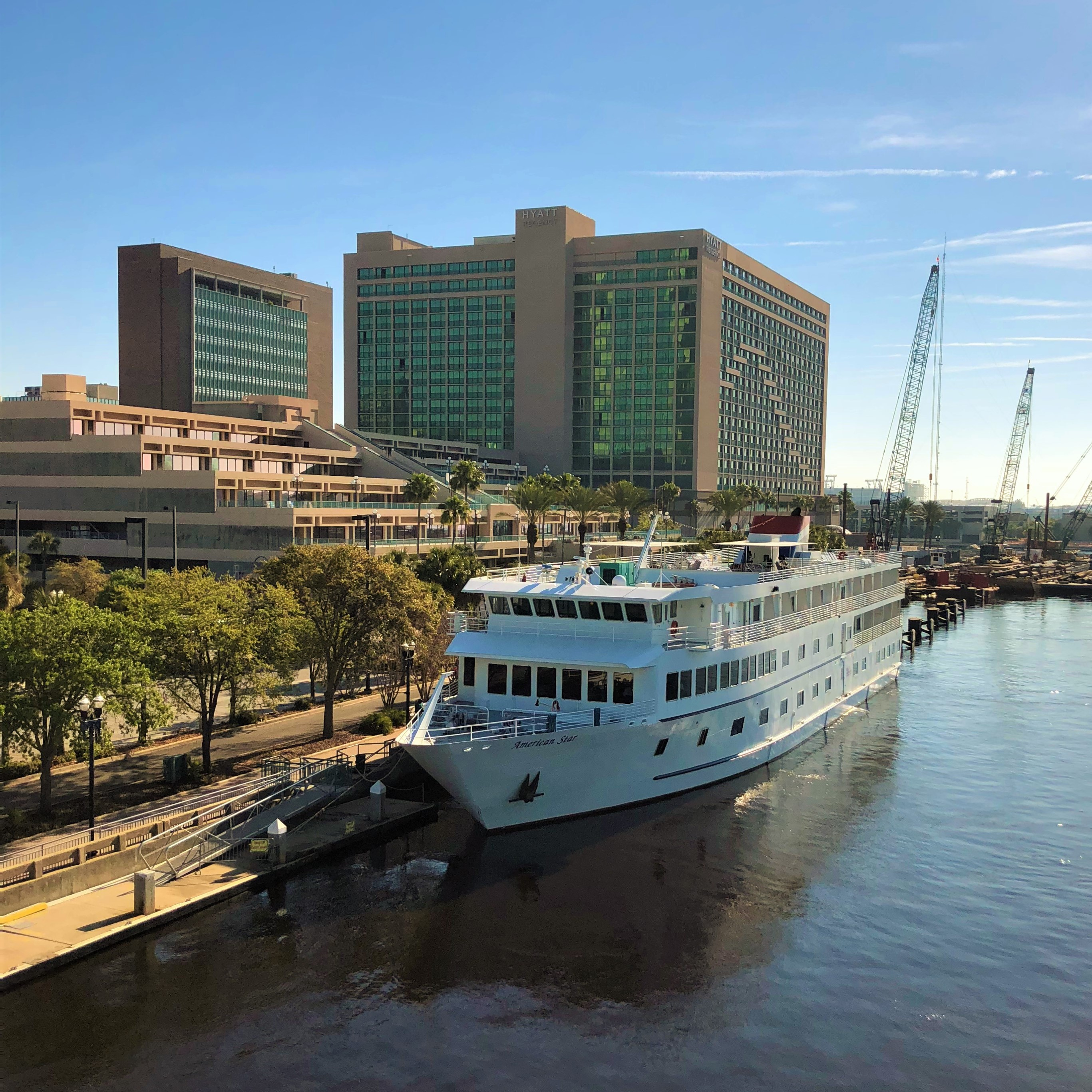

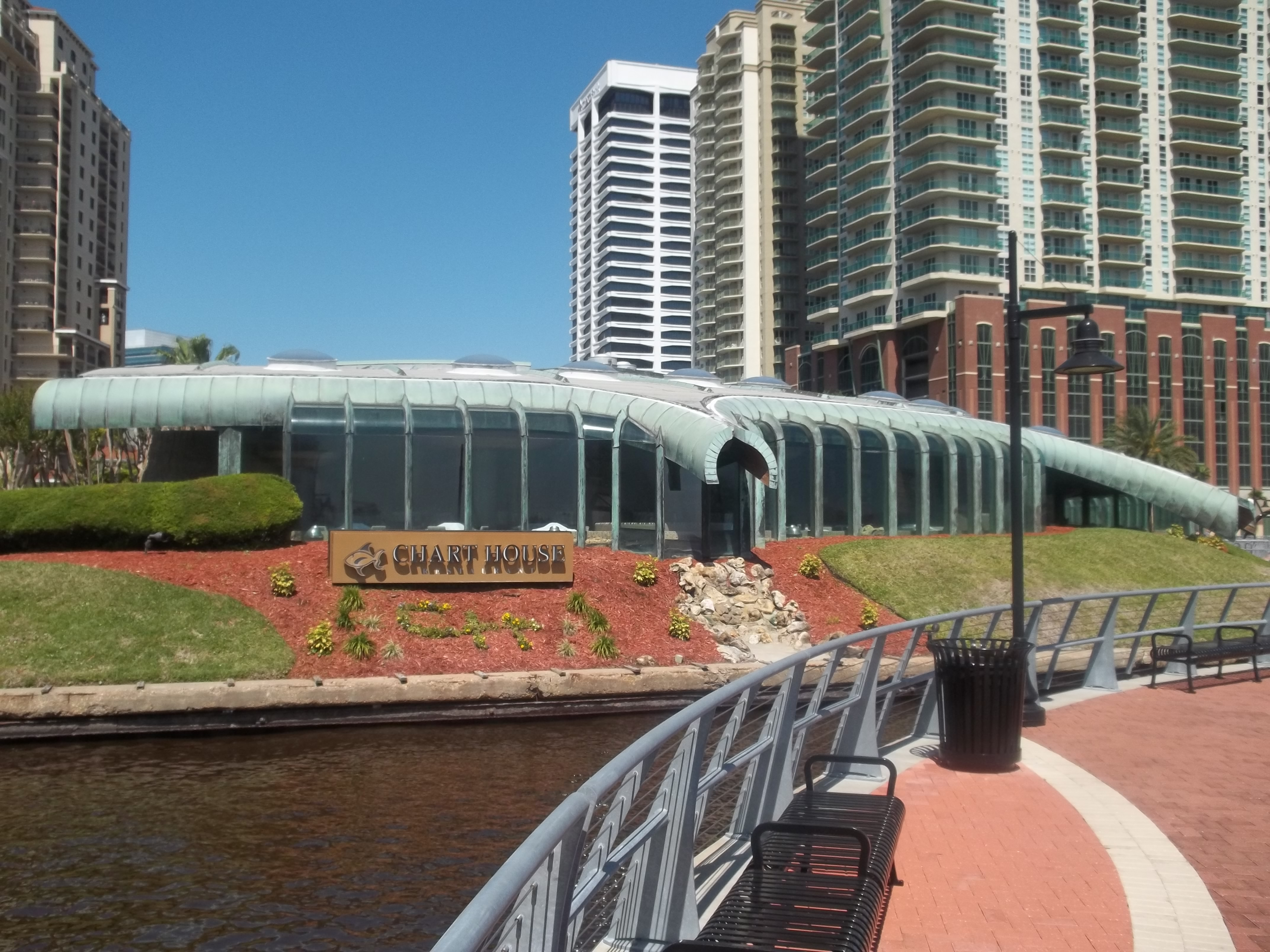
The Chart House Restaurant located along the Southbank Riverwalk

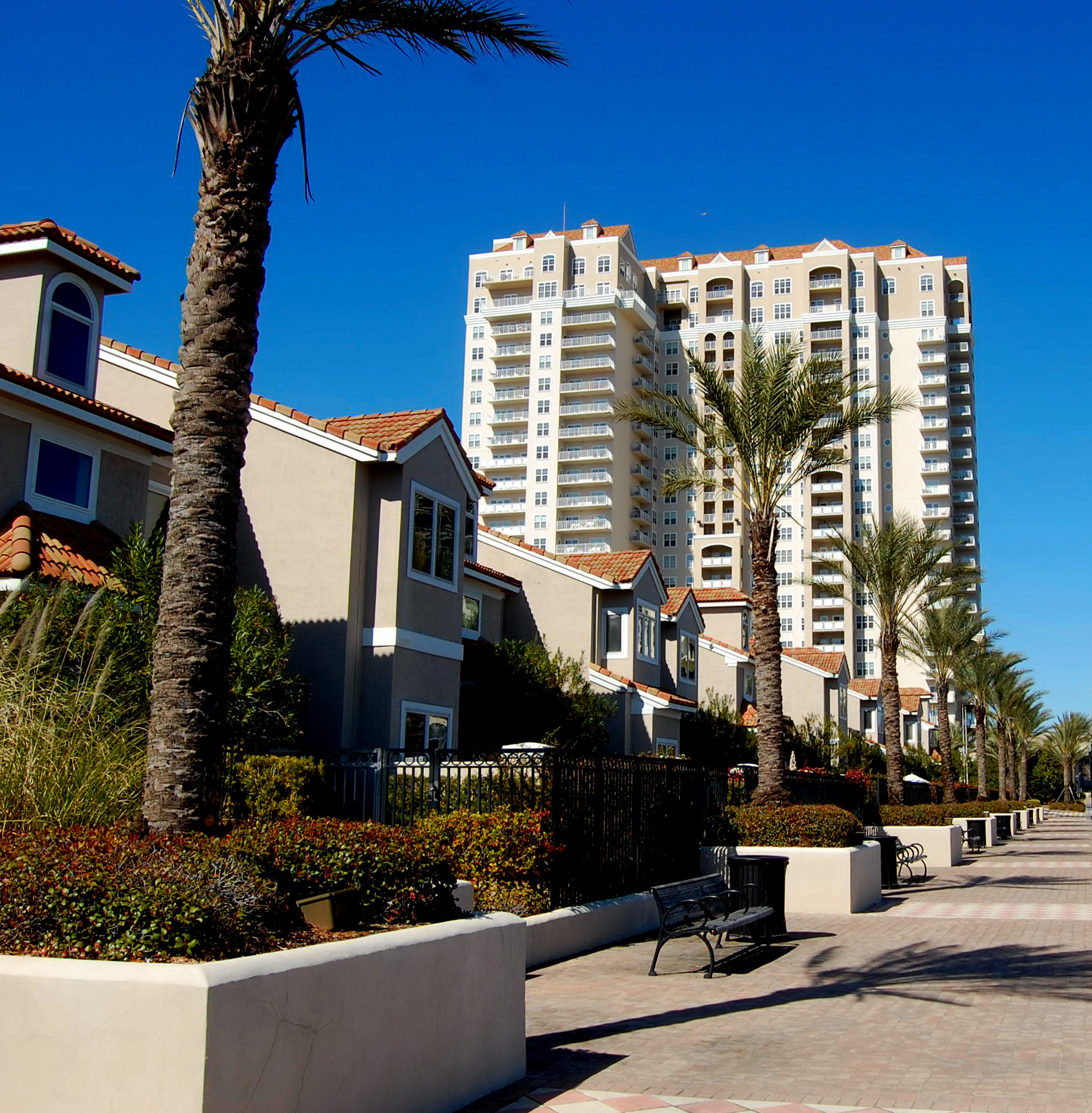
Housing alongside the Northbank Riverwalk

== See also ==
- Downtown Jacksonville
- Jacksonville Landing
