= Forced Landing =

A forced landing is a landing by an aircraft made under factors outside the pilot's control.

Forced Landing may also refer to:

- Forced Landing (1935 film), 1935 mystery film directed by Melville Brown
- Forced Landing (1941 film), 1941 action film directed by Gordon Wiles

== See also ==
- Landing (disambiguation)
