= Crash Landing =

A crash landing (emergency landing) is an unplanned landing by an aircraft.

Crash Landing may also refer to:

== Film and television ==
- Crash Landing (1958 film), an American film featuring Gary Merrill
- Crash Landing (1999 film), a Chinese thriller film
- Crash Landing (2005 film), a 2005 American action film
- "Crash Landing", an episode of Ice Pilots NWT

== Music ==
- Crash Landing (Jimi Hendrix album) (1975)
- Crash-Landing (Die Toten Hosen album) (1999)
- "Crash Landing", a song by NCT 127 from 2 Baddies (2022)

== Other uses ==
- Crash Landing, a novel by Robert Muchamore in the Rock War series

== See also ==
- Crash Landing on You, a Korean drama series
- Landing (disambiguation)
- Emergency Landing (disambiguation)
