= Jacksonville Maritime Museum =

Maritime museum in Jacksonville, Florida

Jacksonville Maritime Heritage Center, also known as Jacksonville Maritime Museum

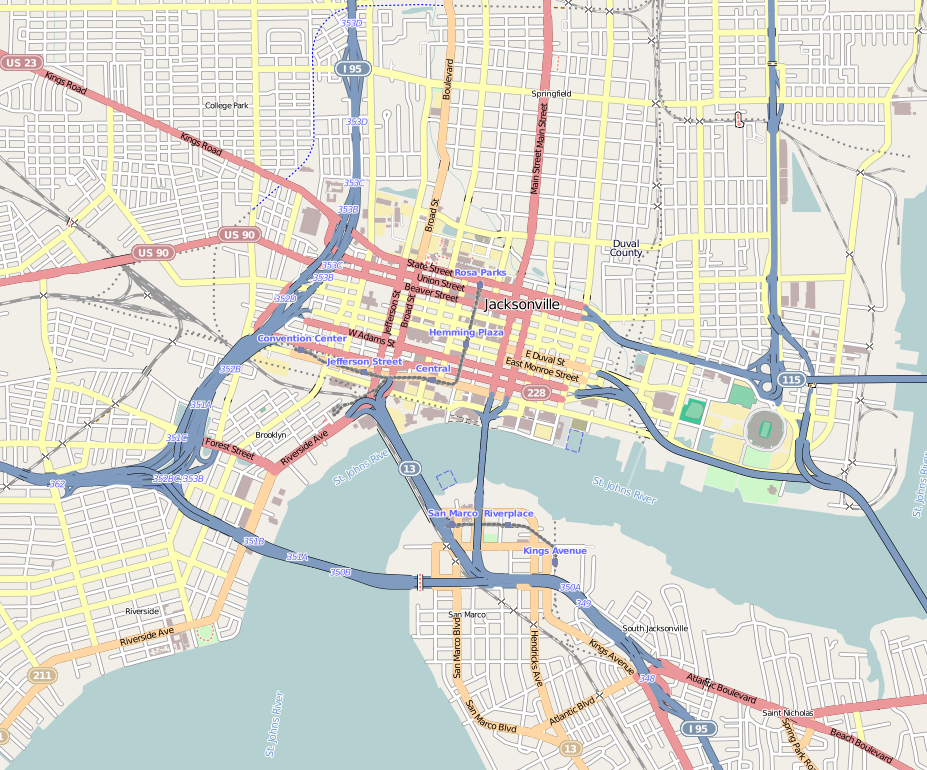
- Location within Central Jacksonville Location within Florida
- Established: 1985 by Fred Sandberg, David Swan, Robert Parrish, and Monica Anguili
- Dissolved: 31 Dec 2015
- Location: Jacksonville, Florida
- Coordinates: 30.324844°N 81.659498°W
- Type: Non-Profit
- Visitors: 9,856 (2014)
- Director: Paul Ghiotto
- Chairperson: Bill Sandberg
- Curator: Paul Ghiotto
- Public transit access: Bus: P3, SS35, WS2, Riverside Trolly; Monorail: Central Station

The Jacksonville Maritime Museum (JMM) – which became known as the Jacksonville Maritime Heritage Center – told the maritime history of Jacksonville, Florida, United States, and the First Coast through its connection to the St. Johns River and the Atlantic Ocean. Its collection included large scale models of ships from Mayflower to present day vessels, as well as paintings, photographs and artifacts dating to 1562.

== History ==
The Jacksonville Maritime Heritage Center began as the Jacksonville Maritime Museum in 1987 and was operated by the Jacksonville Maritime Museum Society, Inc., a non-profit, 501(c)(3) organization. Its goal was to provide a resource that illustrated the local impact of maritime trade and the many aspects of the maritime environment.

The Jacksonville Landing allowed the museum to use unoccupied retail space to display their collection of large-scale model ships for seven years, beginning in 1990. Then Society President Lockhart explained, "Every time they would get a new tenant, they would move us to another empty space." That situation occurred five times in seven years. In mid-November 1997, the museum was given seven days to vacate in preparation for a new tenant. "This time, they just ran out of empty space," commented Lockhart. Many exhibits were put into storage or loaned.

Museum on the Riverwalk before returning to the Landing in 2011

Beginning in 1993, their primary facility was located in a 1500 sq.ft² enclosed pavilion on the South bank of the Jacksonville Riverwalk, near Friendship Fountain. It remained there for nearly 18 years until it returned to the Jacksonville Landing and reopened in January 2011 for a lower monthly rent.

The new location was on the ground floor, east side, and accommodated the display of more items. Ship models that were loaned out for display at other places were returned to the Jacksonville Maritime Heritage Center. The space included an interactive children's display and a theatre with seating for 60.

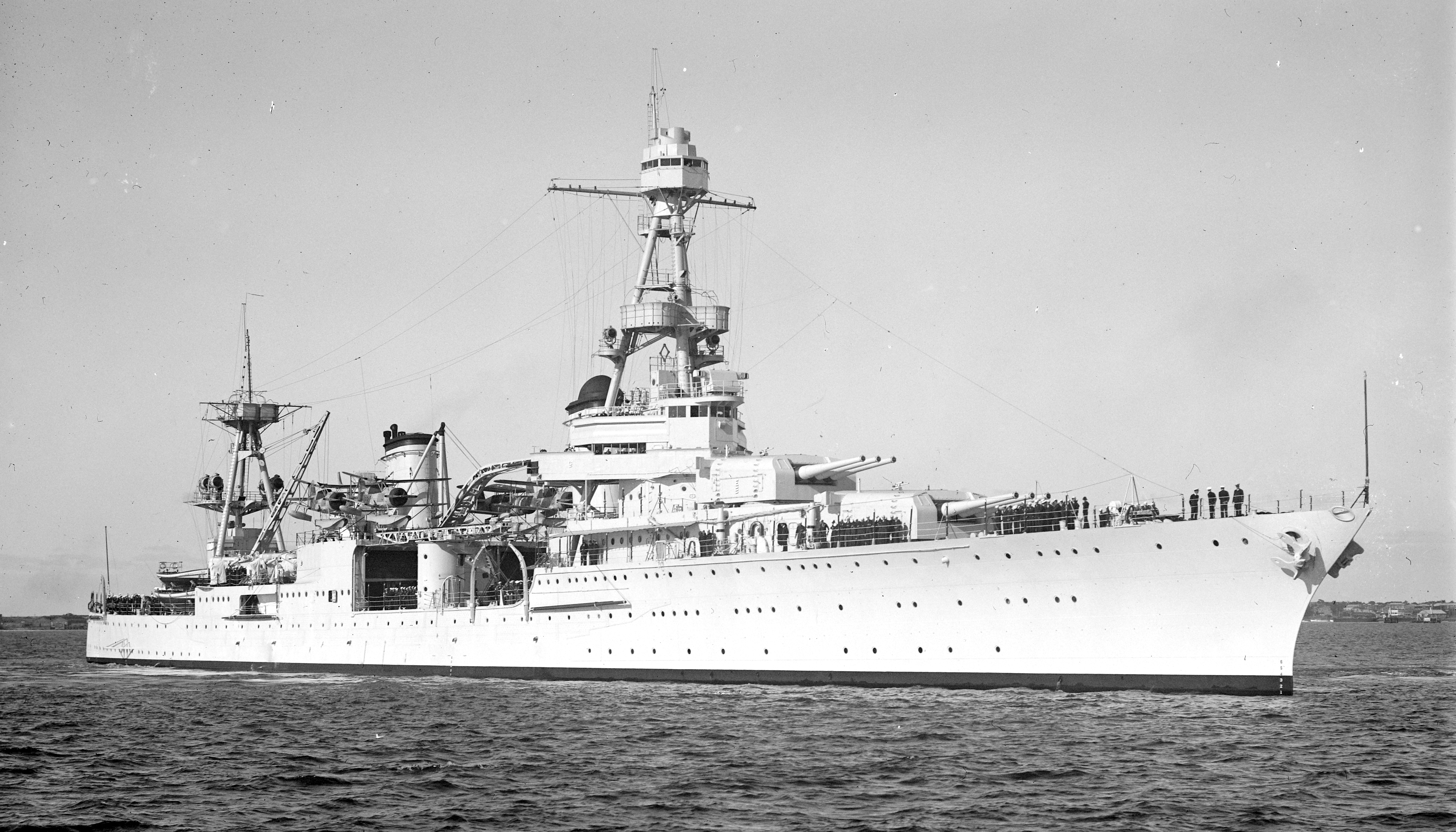
Heavy cruiser USS Louisville

=== Dissolution ===
At the society's board of directors meeting in August 2015, they voted to dissolve the museum at the end of the calendar year. The museum received no financial support from the city government, and memberships and donations were not enough to cover the $45,000 budget of the volunteer-run non-profit.

== Collection ==
The museum housed hundreds of artifacts and included permanent exhibits on the aircraft carrier USS Saratoga and Napoleon B. Broward’s Three Friends Tugboat. Popular exhibits included St. Johns Riverboats, Shipbuilding in Jacksonville and the RMS Titanic diorama.

The largest model formerly on display in the museum was that of the World War II U. S. Navy heavy cruiser, USS Louisville. The 18-foot (5.5 m) model was loaned to Jacksonville by its builder, Ray Arthur, then given to the Frazier Museum after the museum declared it surplus to its needs.
