= Riverfront Plaza (Jacksonville) =

Public area on the St. Johns River in Downtown Jacksonville, Florida

- Riverfront Plaza pre-construction

- Location within Florida
- Location: 2 West Independent Drive, Jacksonville, Florida, U.S.
- Coordinates: 30.3250°N 81.6598°W
- Area: 9 acres (0.036 km^{2})
- Established: 2025
- Designer: Perkins & Will
- Operator: Jacksonville Department of Parks, Recreation and Community Services
- Open: Year round
- Public transit: Jacksonville water taxi
- Website: Riverfront Plaza

Riverfront Plaza is a public area and green space under construction on the St. Johns River in Downtown Jacksonville, Florida. It is the midpoint of the 2-mile Northbank Riverwalk, just west of the Main Street Bridge. The property was the site of the Jacksonville Landing from 1987 to 2019.

== History ==
Following demolition of the complex in July 2019, there were numerous ideas regarding redevelopment and extended discussions.

=== Design competition ===
The project from Perkins & Will was identified as the winning plan in late July 2021. Agreement was finally reached on a plan and construction began in July 2023 nearly four years after the Landing property was cleared.

=== Construction ===
==== Phase 1A ====
The first job began in July 2023, and involved removing part of Independent Drive and rerouting traffic to Hogan Street. It was completed in late 2023.

==== Phase 1B ====
The second job of phase 1 began in January 2024 and required replacing the bulkhead on the St. Johns River and the Riverwalk itself, then constructing the pavilion building with a playground for children on top. The last part of phase 1 is the event lawn, a large grass area for concerts & festivals. The plaza also connects to the Jacksonville Center for the Performing Arts. Projected completion was third or fourth quarter of 2025.

==== Phase 2 ====
The last phase is expected to begin in early 2026 and be finished in 2027. Plans include a bike/pedestrian connection from the Main Street Bridge to the Riverfront Plaza, a rain garden and a beer garden.

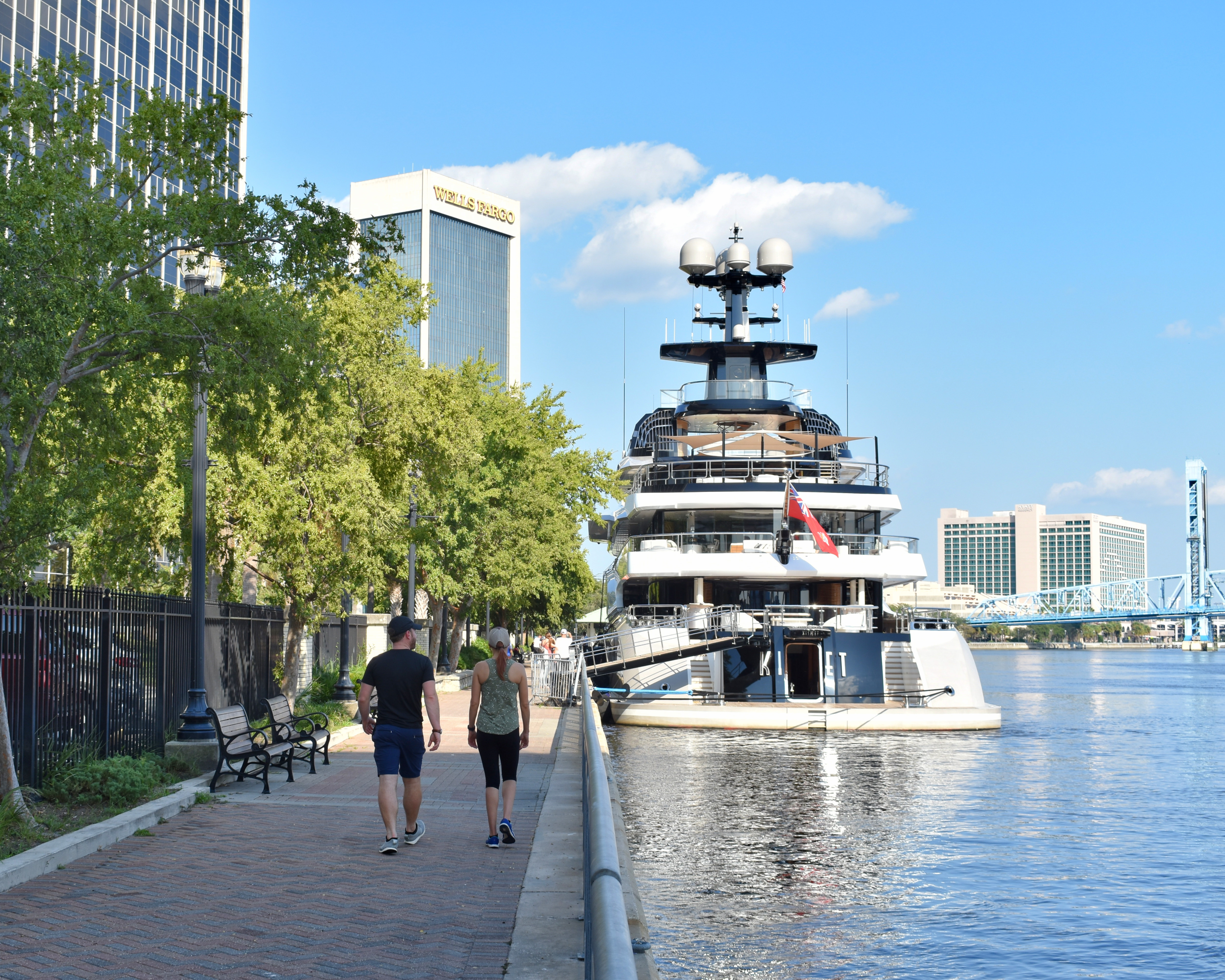
Jacksonville's Riverwalk along the St. Johns River and Riverfront Plaza

=== Opening ===
The "soft" opening of the $38 million phase I was held November 29, 2025 as part of the first Holiday River Fest. A ceremony to light the city's Christmas tree and the annual St. Johns River Light Boat Parade was also observed by thousands of attendees. A fireworks display followed the parade.

The playground is scheduled to open on December 5. The cafe space is substantially complete but has not accepted bids from competing restaurants. It should open in early 2026.

== See also ==
- Jacksonville Landing
- Jacksonville Riverwalks
- Downtown Jacksonville
