= Landing Creek =

Landing Creek may refer to:

- Landing Creek (New Jersey), a stream
- Landing Creek (South Dakota), a stream
