= Riverside Arts Market =

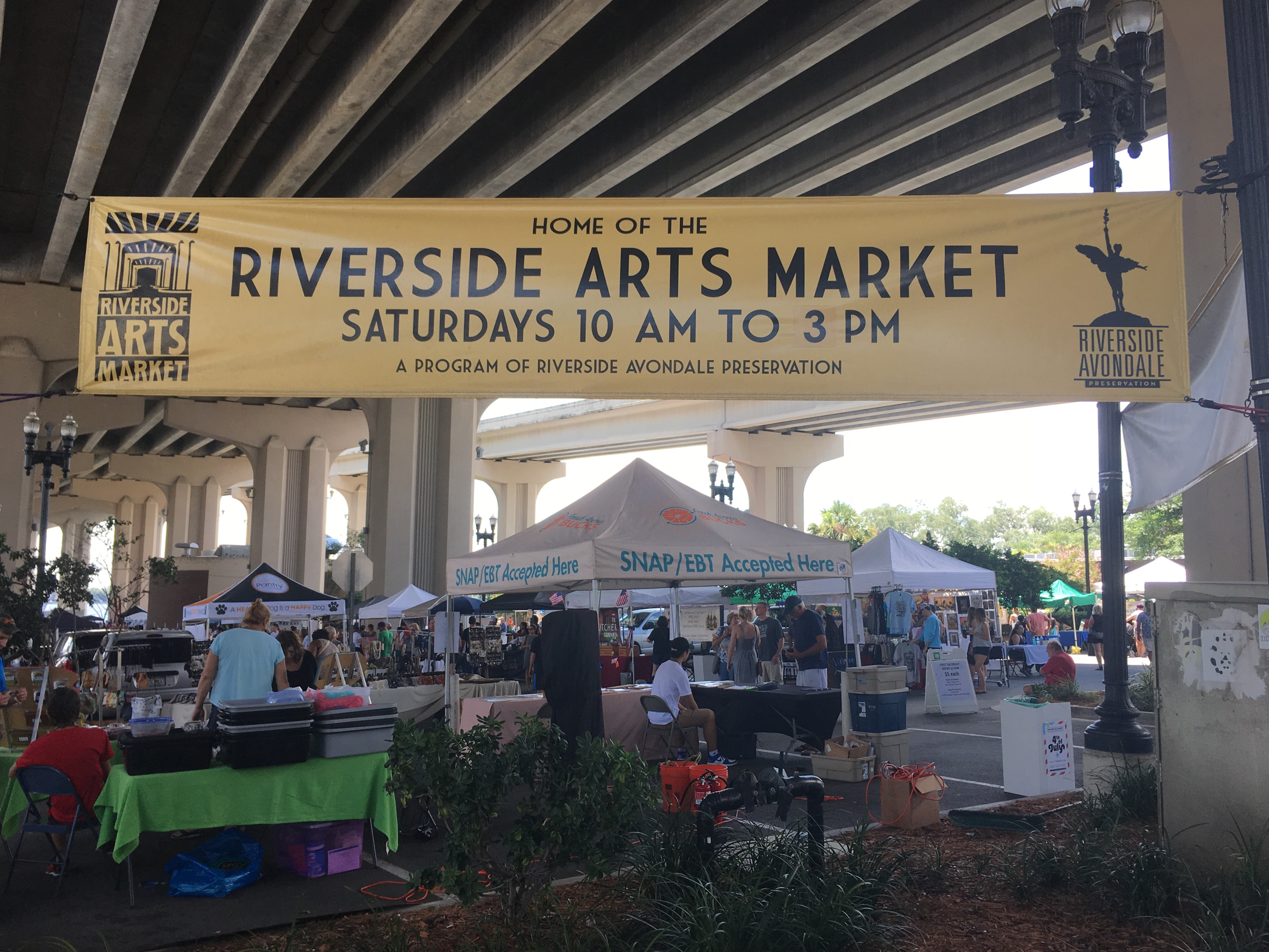
- Location: 715 Riverside Avenue, Jacksonville, FL
- Organised by: Riverside Avondale Preservation
- Website: https://riversideartsmarket.com/

The Riverside Arts Market (RAM) of Jacksonville, Florida is a weekly arts-and-crafts market featuring live music, food, art, and fresh produce. It first opened to the public in the spring of 2009 and currently opens every Saturday 10AM-3PM ET rain or shine, year-round. The marketplace includes a 350-person amphitheater known as Northbank Riverwalk Artists’ Square and forms the terminus for the Northbank Riverwalk. It is located underneath the Fuller Warren Bridge alongside the St. Johns River.

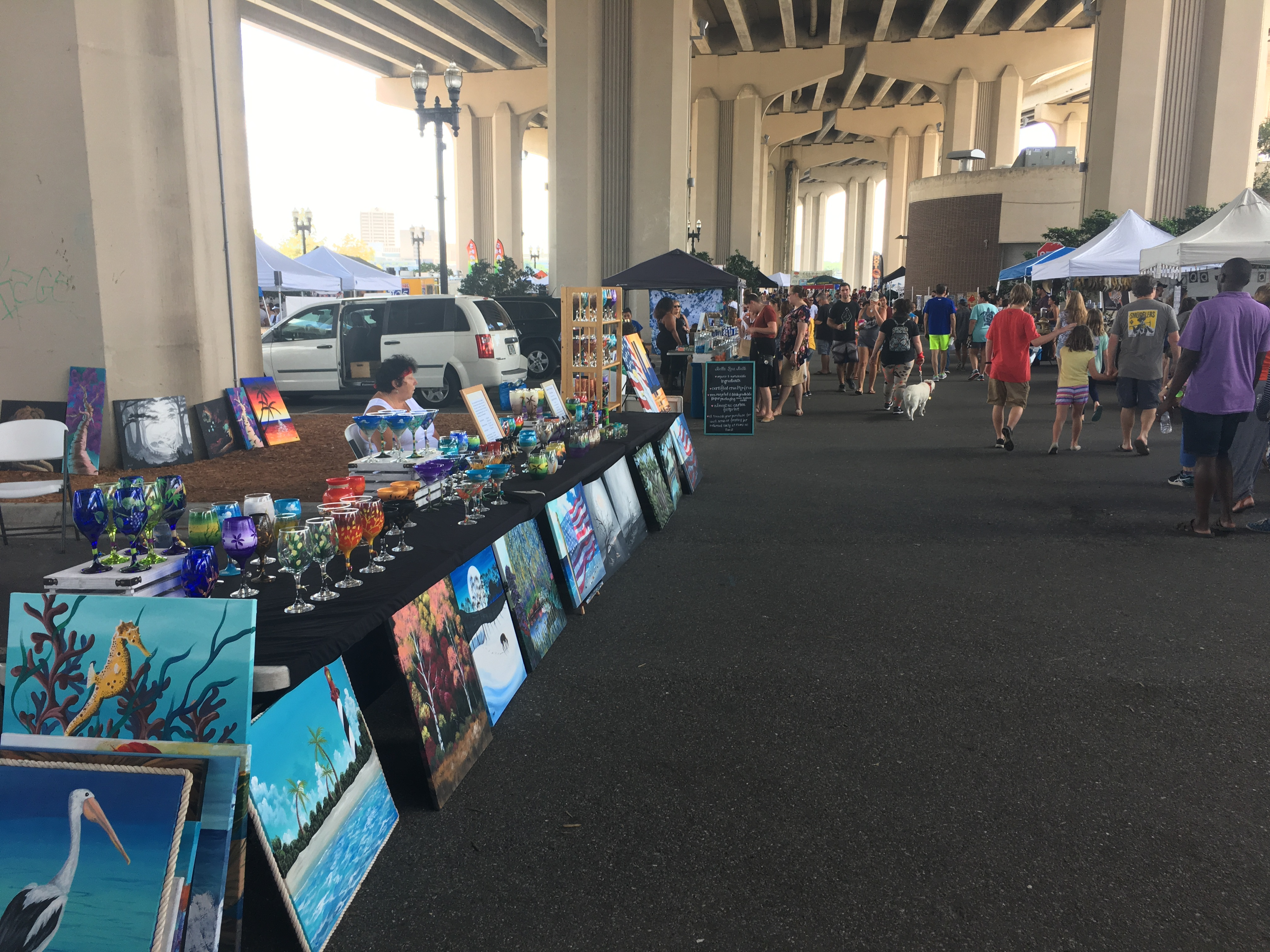
Riverside Arts Market Art Vendor

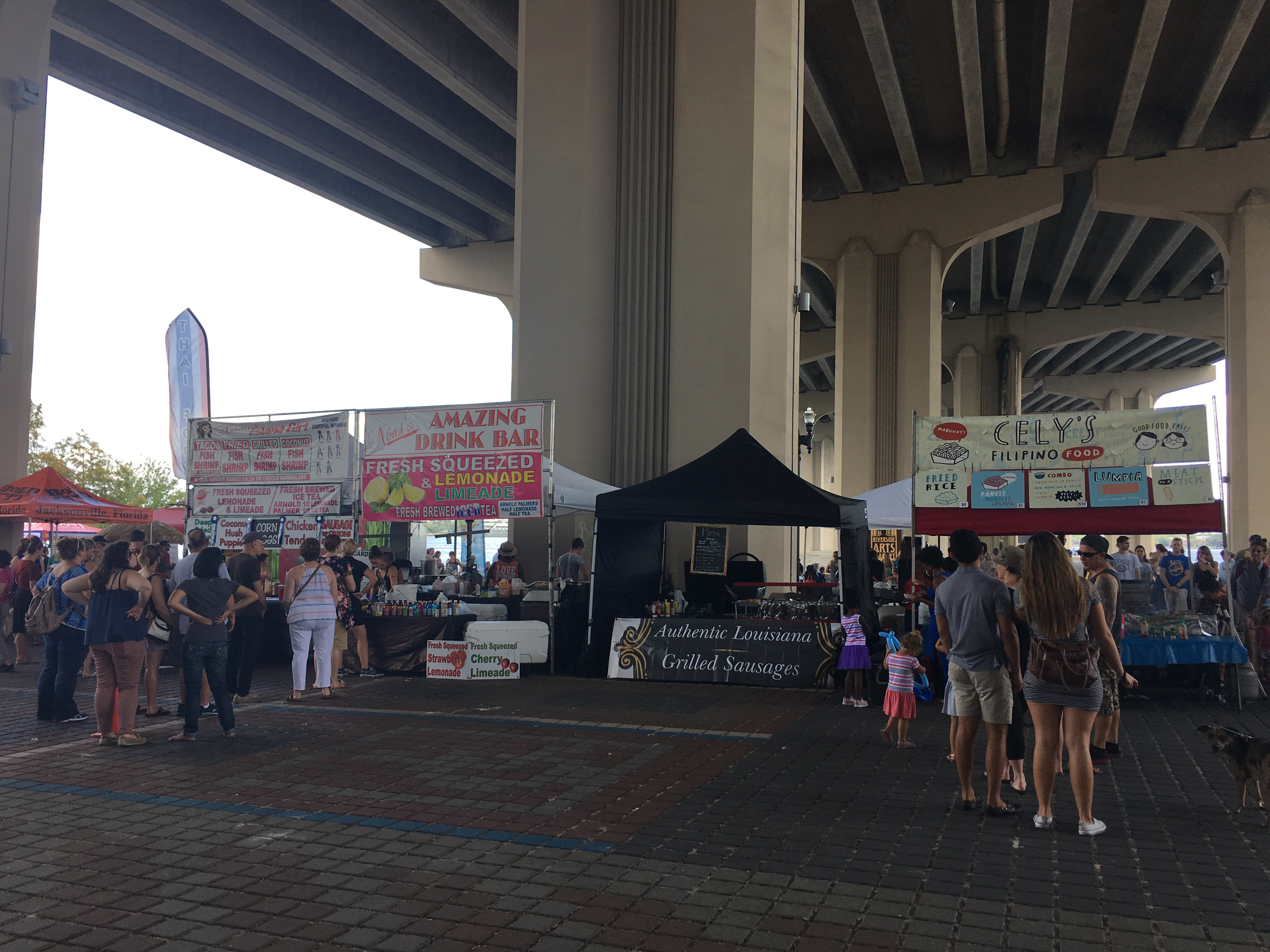
Riverside Arts Market Food Vendors

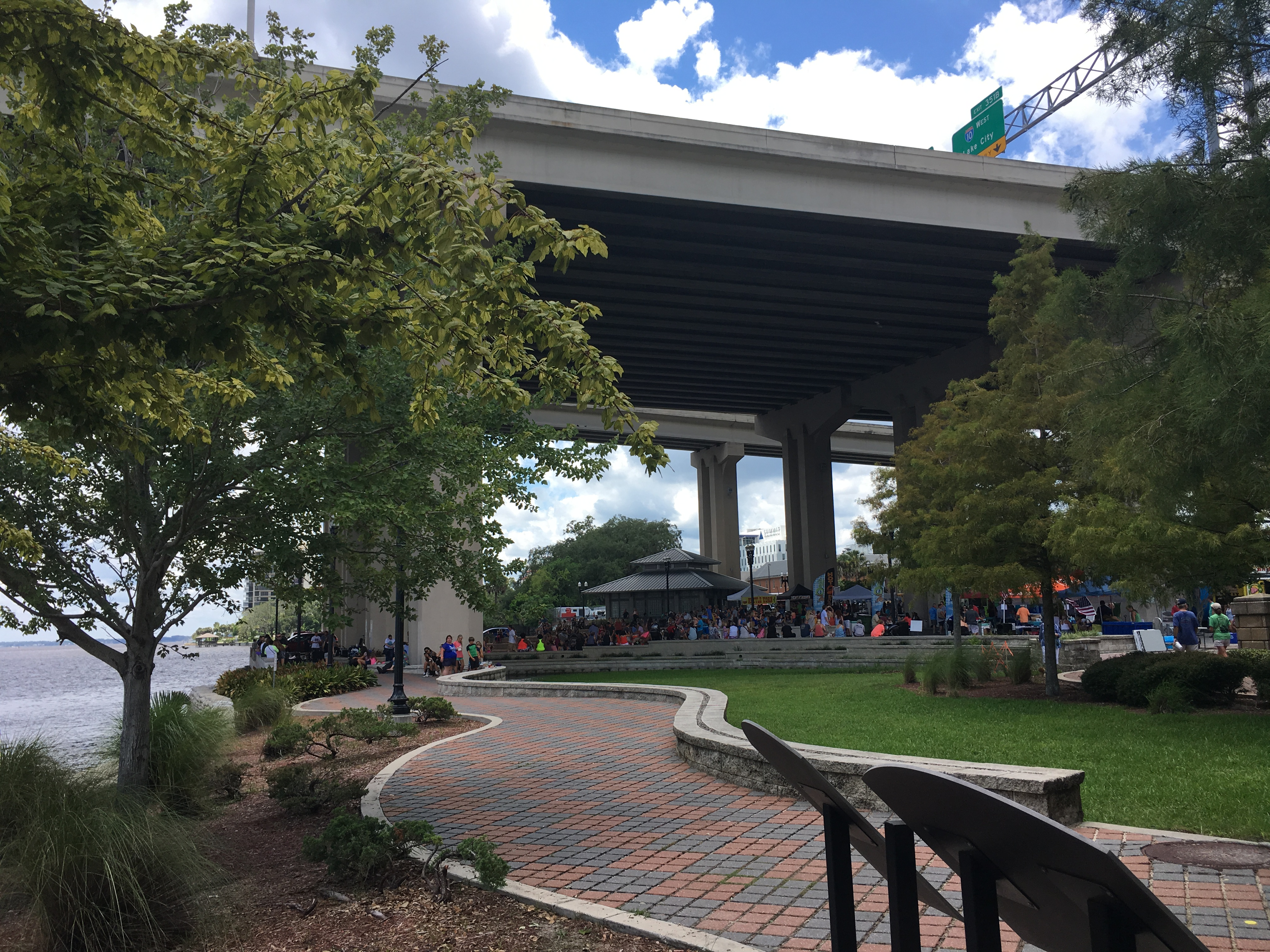
Riverside Arts Market Fuller Warren Bridge Canopy

== History ==
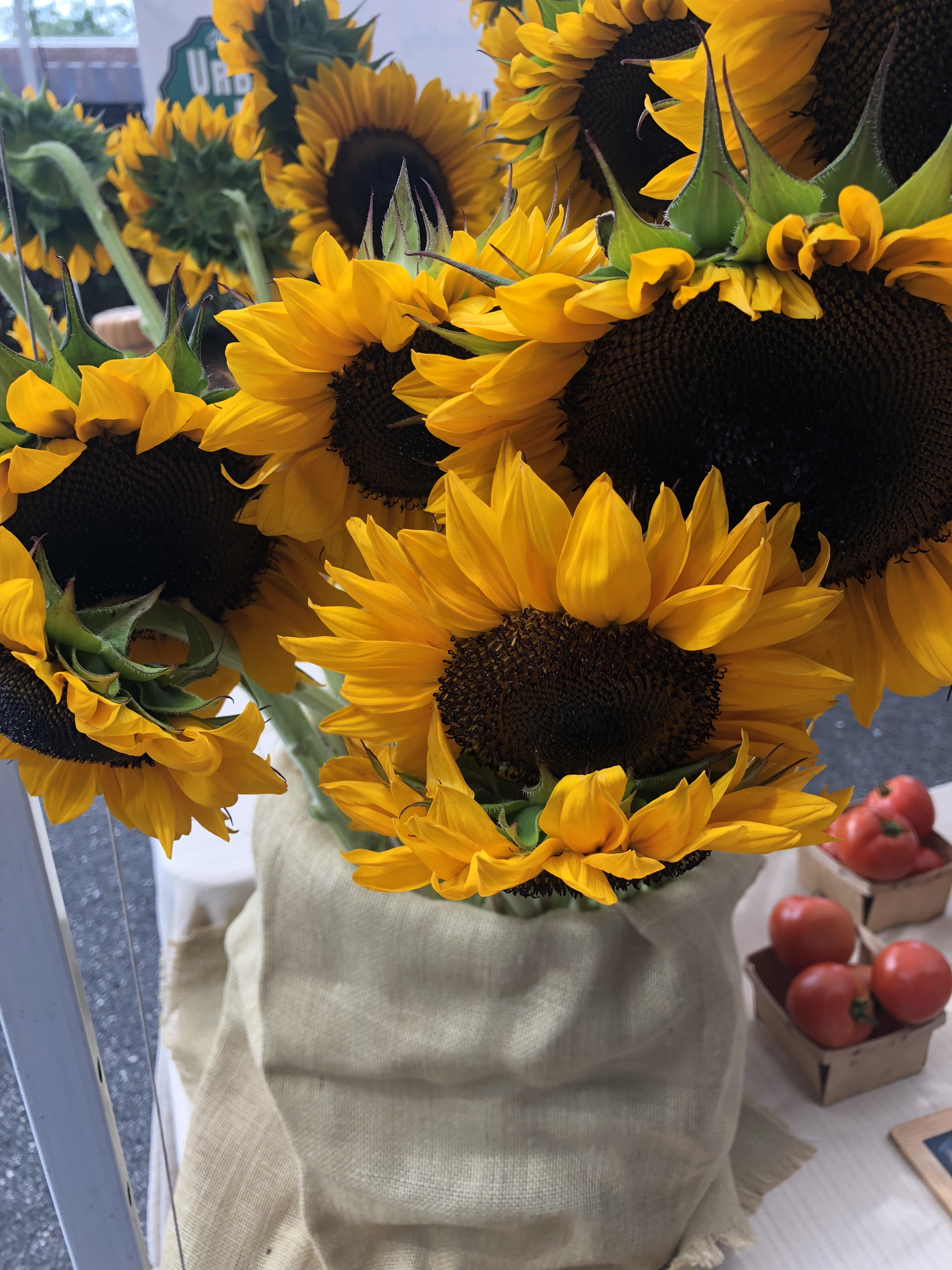
Sunflowers sold from a local flower vender at The Riverside Art Market

RAM is a program of Riverside Avondale Preservation (RAP), a neighborhood advocacy not-for-profit 501(c)3. RAP works to enhance and preserve the architecture, history, cultural heritage and economic viability of the historic neighborhoods of Riverside and Avondale in Jacksonville through programs such as the Riverside Arts Market and the Home Tour. The area that houses the Riverside Arts Market had originally been designated as an area for a retention pond with a chain-link fence around it. The founder of RAP, Wayne Wood, a Jacksonville activist and retired optometrist who moved to Jacksonville in 1971, saw potential for a greater use of the area and worked to model the Riverside Arts Market for a similar farmers' market concept in Portland, Oregon. Neighboring The Cummers Art Museum and Downtown Jacksonville, RAM's central location has made it accessible to visitors. Today, it is considered family-friendly and attracts 4,000+ visitors every week. Individuals can purchase a variety of products such as local fruits and vegetables, flowers, handmade art, soap products, and street food.

== Initiatives ==
The market made the transition to a producer-only market in 2016 to promote locally grown food. As a producer-only market, only true local farms are allowed as vendors. Also in 2016, RAM began participating in both the Supplemental Nutrition Assistance Program (SNAP) and Fresh Access Bucks (FAB) programs. Through a partnership with Florida Organic Grower's Incentive program, local produce sellers are able to double their dollars.

Riverside Arts Market is an example of public/private partnership with funding for its extensive infrastructure obtained from FDOT, the City of Jacksonville, JEA, JTA, and Fidelity National.

RAM also encourages local artisans, craftsmen, performers, and artists to participate in the market.

== Recognition ==
RAM is the six-time winner of Folio Weekly’s Best of Jacksonville Award for Best Farmers’ Market. In 2012, RAM won the Urban Land Institute’s North Florida District Council’s Public Sector Award. RAM has also been recognized in dozens of publications including USA Today and The Financial Times of London.

== Features ==
RAM features activities throughout the day such as 9AM yoga, dance performances, and guest speakers. The Riverside Arts Market is also a dog-friendly space. Many vendors have bowls of water available for passing canines, and there are usually a few places where you can shop for dog treats and accessories.

Free parking is located at the Fidelity/Black Knight Financial building next to the market, and also around the neighborhood. Bike riders can use ZenCog’s Bike Valet to park their bike. For bus riders, the closest bus stop is Riverside Ave. and Peninsular Place.

== See also ==
- Jacksonville, Florida#Leisure and entertainment
  1. Riversideartsmarket on Instagram
