= Emergency Landing =

Emergency landing is an unplanned landing by an aircraft.

Emergency Landing may also refer to:

- Emergency Landing (1941 film), an American film directed by William Beaudine
- Emergency Landing (1952 film), a Norwegian film (Nødlanding), directed by Arne Skouen
- Emergency Landing (2023 film), a Russian film with Russian title Na solnce, vdol' riadov kukuruzy

== See also ==
- Crash Landing (disambiguation)
- Forced landing
- Water landing
