= Jacksonville Landing =

Defunct complex in Northeast Florida, U.S.

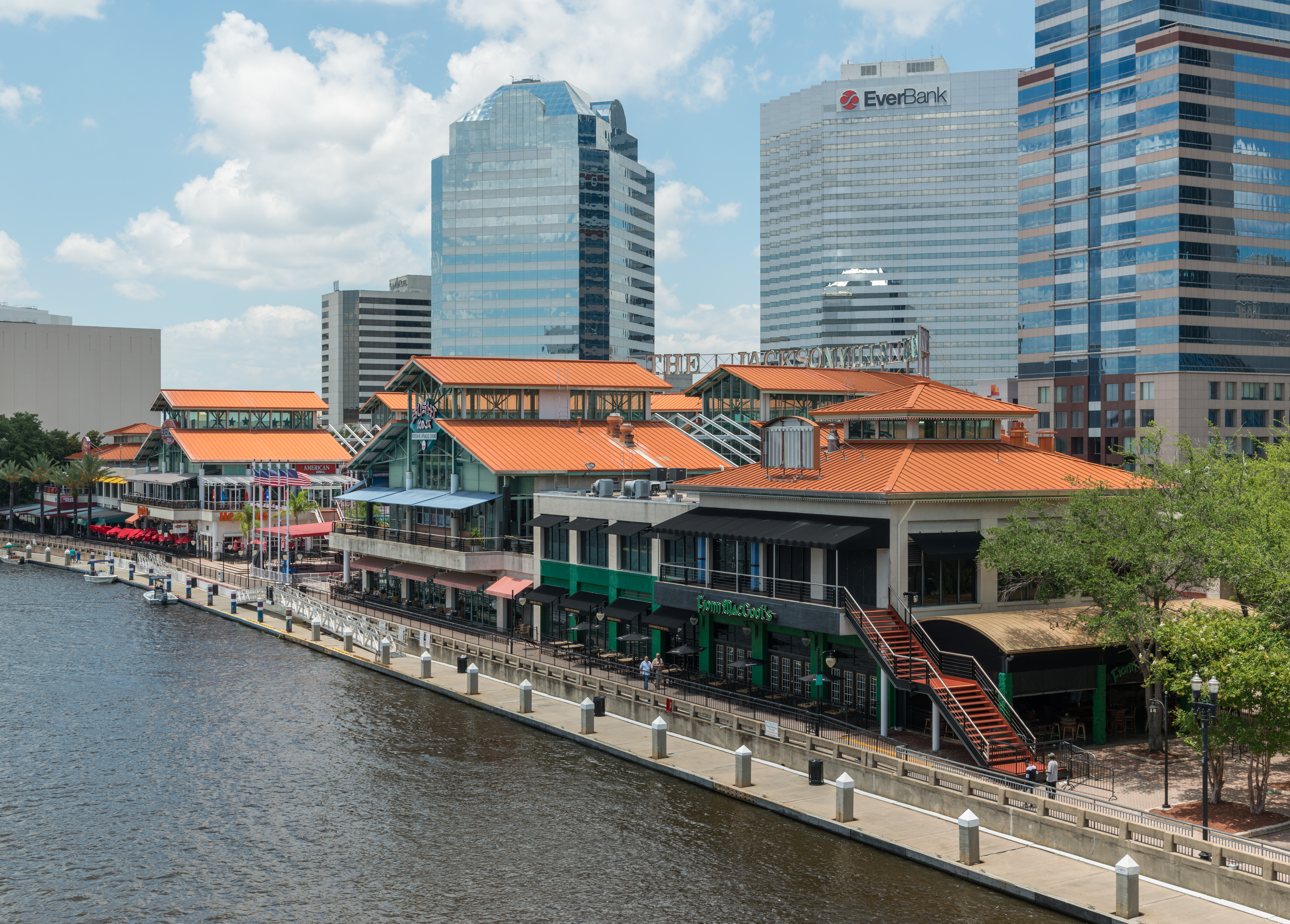
- Southeast view (July 2016)
- Location: Jacksonville, Florida, United States
- Coordinates: 30.3250°N 81.6598°W
- Address: 2 W. Independent Drive, 32202
- Opened: June 25, 1987; 39 years ago
- Closed: May 31, 2019; 7 years ago (final remaining tenants); July 5, 2019; 7 years ago (mall interior)
- Demolished: October 8, 2019 – January 31, 2020
- Developer: The Rouse Company
- Owner: City of Jacksonville
- Architect: Benjamin Thompson and Associates, Inc.; Hans D. Strauch
- Num. of stores: 65+ (at peak); ≈0 as of July 2019
- Floor area: 126,000 square feet (12,000 m^{2})
- Floors: 2
- Parking: Paid parking
- Building details
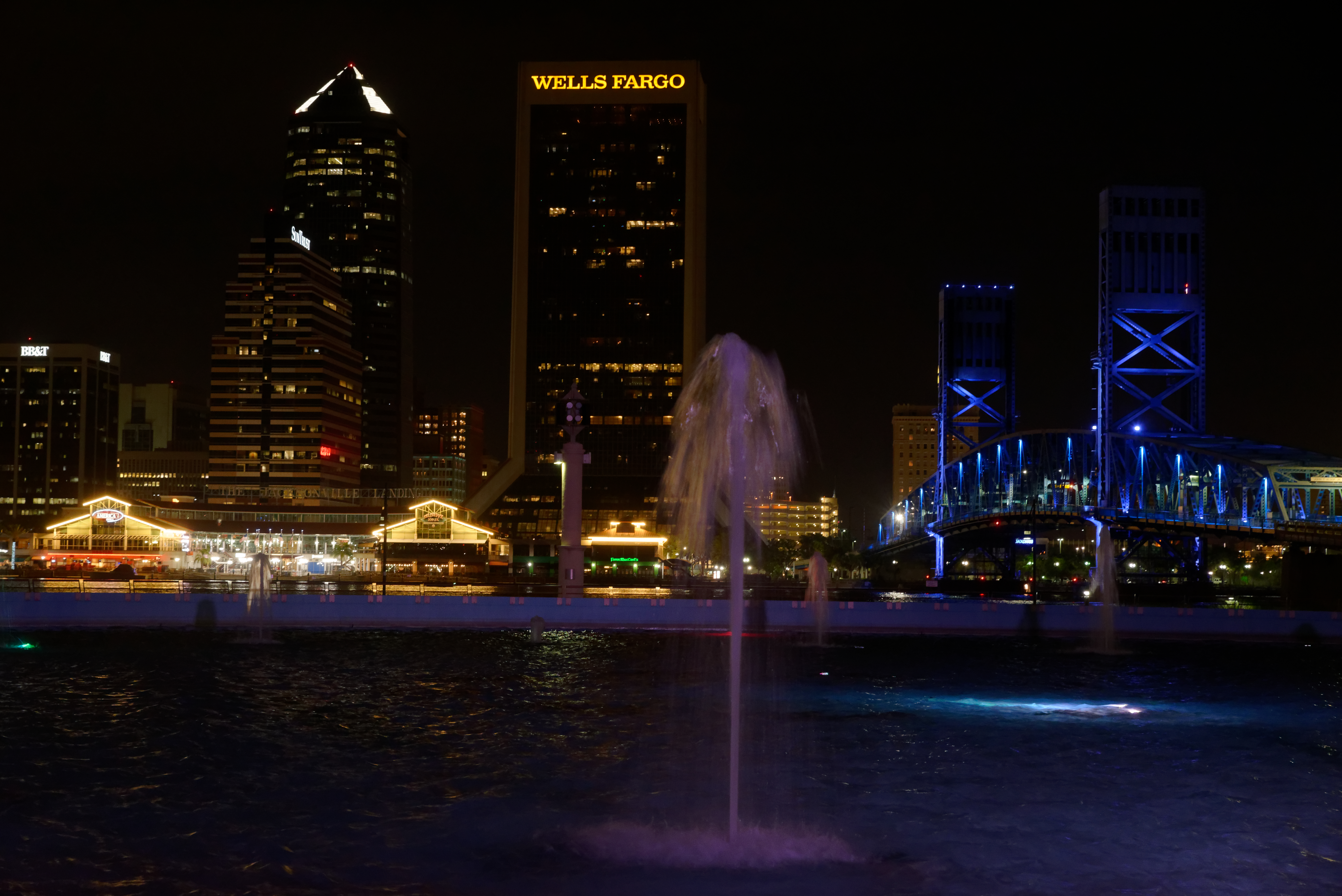
- St. Johns River view of the Friendship Fountain and the Jacksonville Landing at night (May 2018)

General information
- Status: Defunct; undergoing redevelopment as Riverfront Plaza
- Type: Festival marketplace (1987–1991); Shopping mall (1991–2019); Entertainment complex (1987–2019)
- Construction started: May 1986; 40 years ago
- Completed: 1987

Design and construction
- Main contractor: The Auchter Co.

Website
- www.jacksonvillelanding.com at the Wayback Machine (December 2013 archive)

The Jacksonville Landing (informally The Landing) was a horseshoe-shaped shopping center and entertainment complex in Downtown Jacksonville, Florida, at the intersection of Independent Drive and Laura Street, along the Jacksonville Riverwalk. It was developed by the Rouse Company for $37.5 million and opened in September 1987.

The 126,000 square feet (11,706 m^{2}) center was comparable to New York City's South Street Seaport, Baltimore's Harborplace, Boston's Faneuil Hall Marketplace, and Miami's Bayside Marketplace (which was also in Florida and opened two months before the Landing) all of which were also developed by Rouse. Jacksonville Landing was originally (and the last) festival marketplace developed by the Rouse Company from scratch before they discontinued the concept in 1987 and shifted exclusively to renovating existing structures into festival marketplaces and developing mixed-use centers, starting with The Gallery at Harborplace.

Following a legal battle with the city and Sleiman Enterprises, the Landing never adapted; Jacksonville owned the land, and Sleiman managed the mall. The facility closed its doors after July 4th celebrations, and demolition began on October 8, 2019. As of November 2025, the site is now urban green space, known as Riverfront Plaza (informally The Lawnding), at 333 Jacksonville Landing, the address being named after the former mall.

== Overview ==
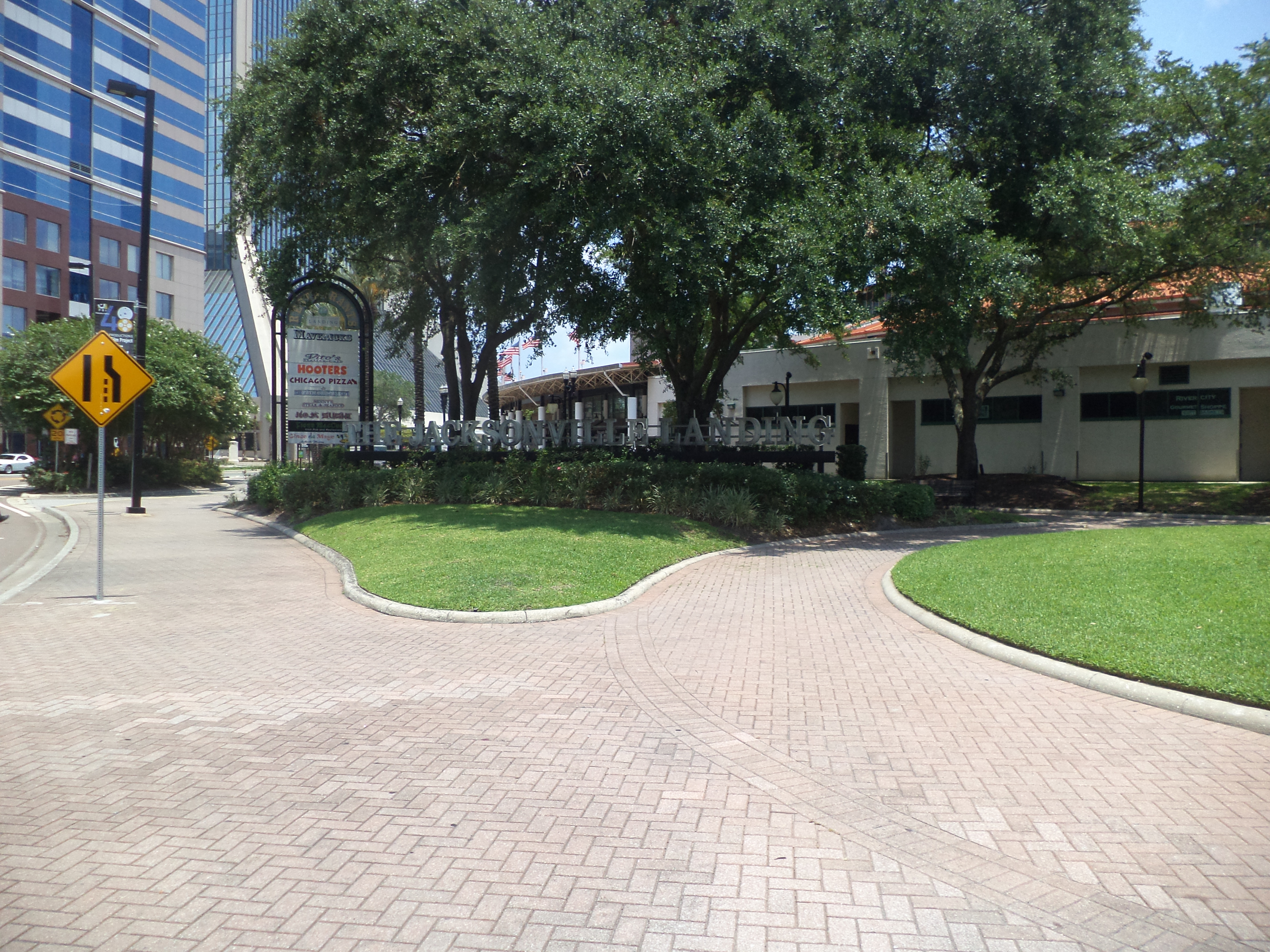
Western side (June 2014)

The mall was located on the north bank of the St. Johns River. The 9-acre (36,000 m^{2}) complex once featured 65 stores as well as dining, with full-service restaurants plus a food court, and entertainment. The Landing staged a variety of special events. There was weekly live music on the courtyard stage. Most events took place in the open brick courtyard in the center of the horseshoe-shaped structure. Just before the Georgia-Florida football game in 2007, the Landing installed a 19 × 15-foot (5.8 × 4.6 m) JumboTron in the courtyard.

=== Patronage ===
The Landing had a local patronage base of over 65,000 downtown office workers and over 1,000,000 residents in the surrounding metropolitan area of North Florida. According to various Florida travel sources, it had been "an icon" for Jacksonville and "one of the most recognized attractions in Northeast Florida" since it opened in June 1987. Downtown Improvement District (DID) for Jacksonville claims it was a popular tourist destination.

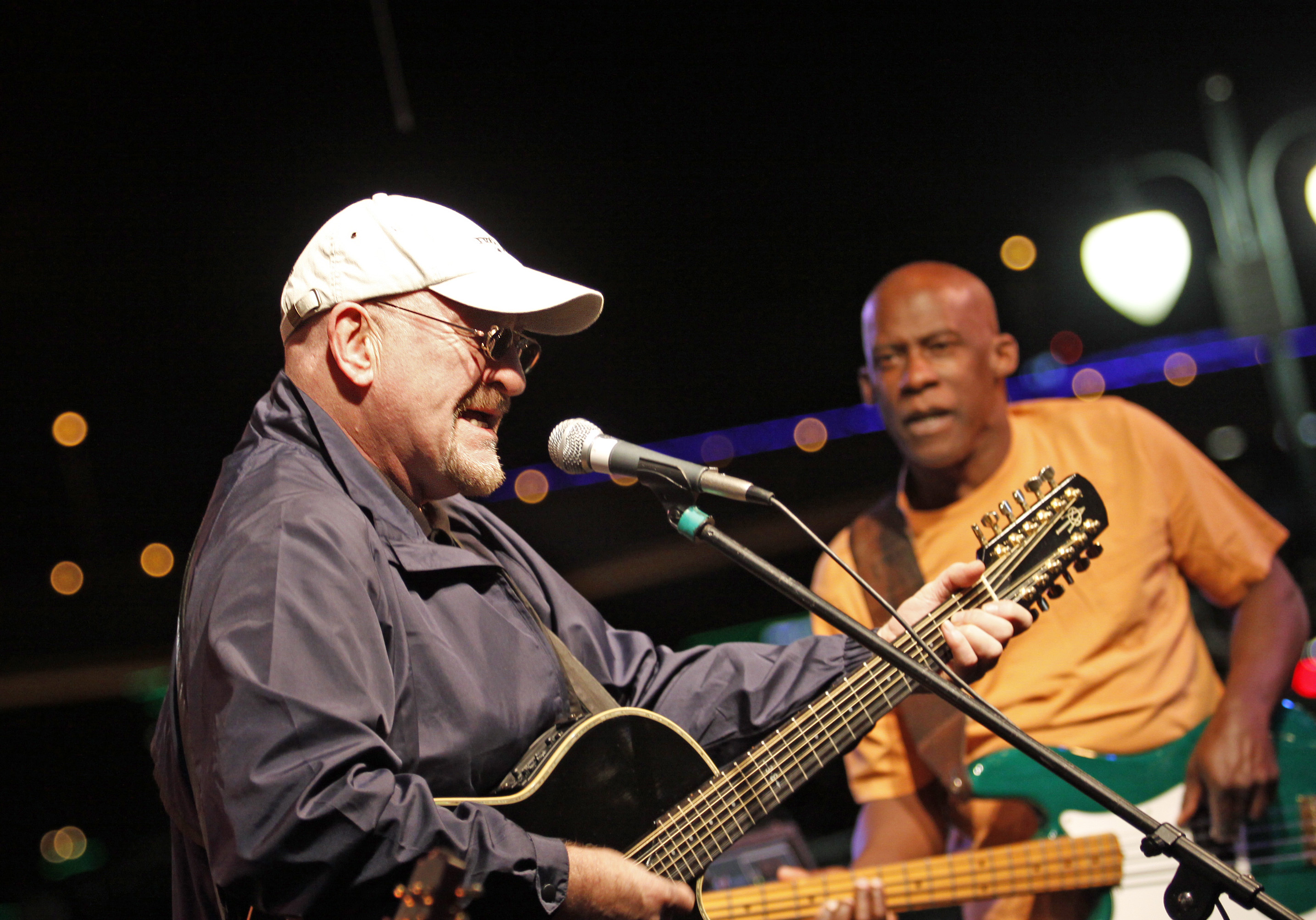
Dave Mason in Concert Live @ Jacksonville Landing (December 2008)

=== Events ===
The Landing hosted more than 300 events each year including Florida/Georgia Weekend Celebrations, the annual Christmas Tree Lighting, New Year’s Eve and Gator Bowl Celebrations, St. Patrick’s Day, the Jacksonville Jazz Festival and July 4 fireworks.

Weekly events included year-round live entertainment in the center courtyard every Friday, Saturday and Sunday. The bands offered a variety of music including classic rock, oldies, contemporary, jazz, and top 40. The Landing also hosted national country concerts and classic rock concerts in the spring, summer and fall each year.

In September 2010, Sleiman Enterprises announced a partnership with Downtown Vision to host an every Friday Farmer's Market from 10 a.m. EDT to 2 p.m. EDT. The market was relocated from Hemming Plaza. Since relocating to The Landing, the market averaged over 40 vendors each week.

The Landing also hosted events for the community, such as charity walks and runs and the Earth Day Ecology Fair.

=== Museum ===
The Landing allowed the Jacksonville Maritime Museum to use unoccupied retail space to display their collection of large-scale model ships for seven years, beginning in 1990. It was a positive for both parties; the museum increased its exposure with a free venue, and the Landing filled an otherwise empty storefront and offered a free attraction to increase foot traffic. Jacksonville Maritime Museum Society President John Lockhart explained, "Every time they would get a new tenant, they would move us to another empty space." That situation occurred five times in seven years, but in mid-November 1997, the museum was given seven days to vacate in preparation for a new tenant. "This time, they just ran out of empty space," commented Lockhart. Many exhibits were put into storage.

In October 2011, the museum was invited to return to the landing and was given a large space to use. Their former home on the Southbank of the Riverwalk was demolished as part of a larger renovation that included Friendship Fountain.

== History ==
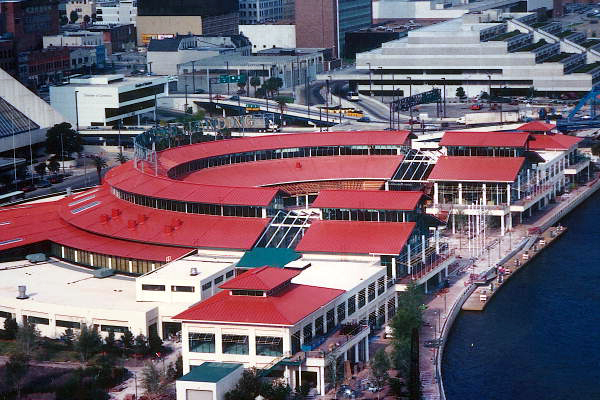
Aerial view of the complex, c. July 1987

=== 1985–1988: Construction, grand opening, and early years ===
A groundbreaking ceremony for the project was held on October 17, 1985, and was attended by then-Mayor Jake Godbold. The Columbia, Maryland-based Rouse Company selected Massachusetts-based architects Benjamin C. Thompson, and Hans D. Strauch of Boston (now HDS Architecture) to design the marketplace, and then founded the subsidiary Rouse-Jacksonville, Inc. for the project. Construction on the Jacksonville Landing began in May 1986. Strauch, who designed the mall's iconic red (later orange) roof, called for a complete open-air design, but Rouse insisted on an enclosed design for the facility.

The Jacksonville Landing opened its doors on June 25, 1987, hosting a week-long celebration featuring drum-and-bugle corps, a balloon release, community choirs, and national acts. The Rouse Company partnered with the City of Jacksonville, which gave $20 million to the construction of a festival marketplace to revitalize the city's core. The first floor of the Landing featured tenants that were common to other shopping malls when it first opened, including Foot Locker, The Gap, and Victoria's Secret.

The second floor of the main building was devoted to the Founders Food Hall, a food court, with 18 restaurants. The décor featured silhouettes of 17 persons instrumental in the settlement of North Florida. Outside seating included a view of the center courtyard fountain and stage and of the river. The Landing's first bar was Fat Tuesdays, which sold frozen alcoholic beverages. The business attracted mostly young customers; the Landing management decided not to renew the 10-year lease, citing a desire for an "older crowd". The Jacksonville Landing celebrated its one-year anniversary in June 1988, topped off with a fireworks display. The Rouse Company explicitly warned the City of Jacksonville that for the Jacksonville Landing to stay successful long term, dedicated parking was required.

=== 1991–2019: Decline ===
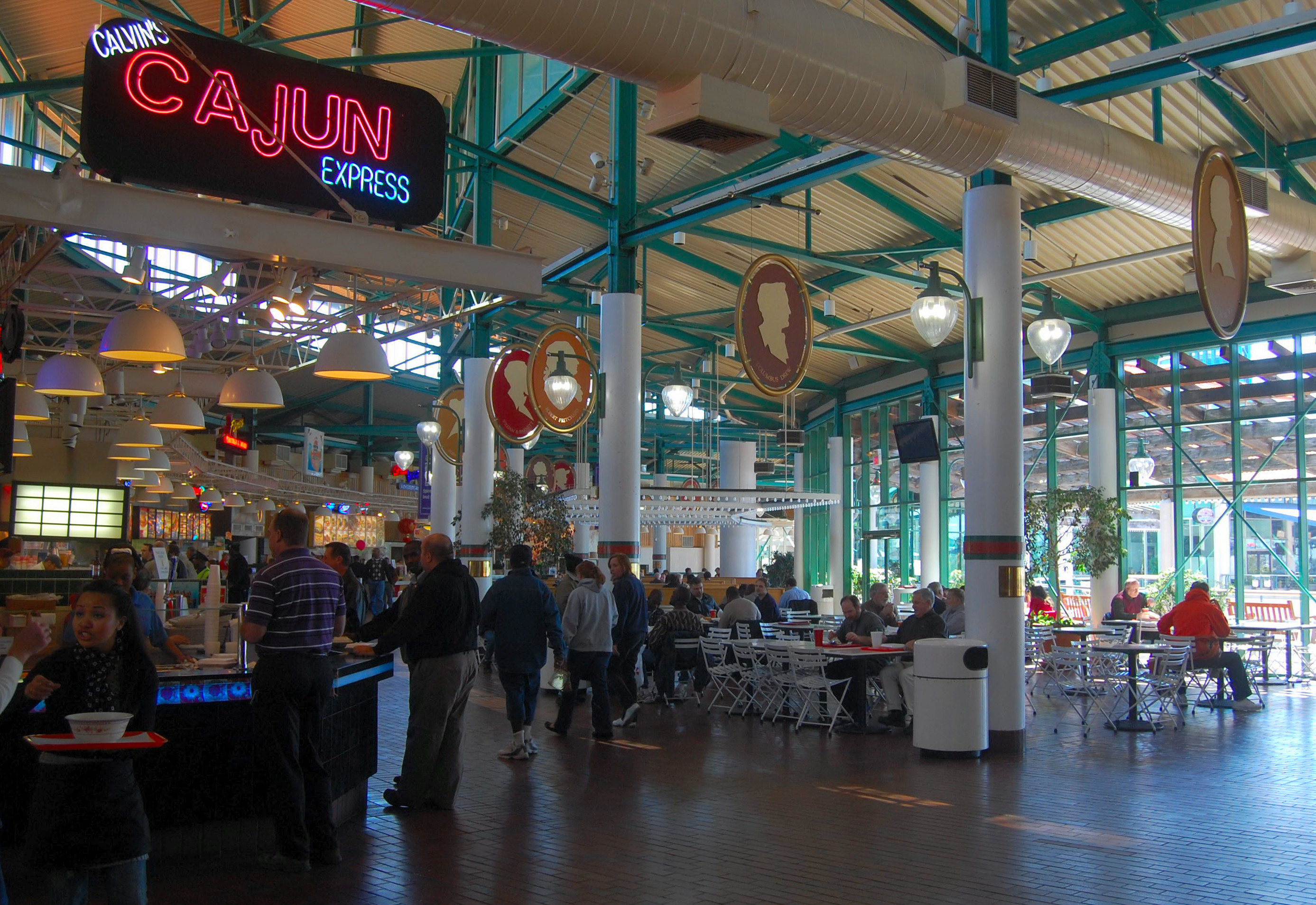
Founders Food Hall (February 2010)

Around the late 1980s, The Rouse Company reported that the Jacksonville Landing was unprofitable despite a successful opening day, with city officials being optimistic that the mall would make a turnaround. Beginning in the early 1990s, foot traffic never reached projected numbers, and within four years, a third of the food court tenants had closed; on January 7, 1991, The Sharper Image closed its doors after just four years of operation. The Florida Times-Union also reported the Brookstone store as closed. Competition from the Avenues Mall, which opened in September 1990—and the perception of the Landing as a tourist trap—played a role in low traffic.

In response to the Landing's initial struggles, The Rouse Co. announced that the west side of the food court would become a video arcade known as Ostrich Landing, which had its grand opening on September 1, 1991, featuring over 200 games. However, the Landing's struggles continued, and the arcade also later closed. On December 31, 1992, Everything Yogurt, one of the Landing's original food vendors, closed permanently. Participants of the Jacksonville Jaguars Boosters Club celebrated at the Hooters restaurant at the Jacksonville Landing after the NFL's announcement that Jacksonville would be an expansion city on November 30, 1993. Ciao Gianni Ristorante and Bar shuttered in early September 1994.

Rouse announced in 2003 that it would sell the Jacksonville Landing to a local developer, Toney Sleiman, for $5.1 million. The Florida Times-Union reported that Sleiman Enterprises, which bought the buildings but not the city-owned land, would not have to pay the $100,000 rent required by the City of Jacksonville for the land until the city provided the 800 parking spaces that it had promised the previous owners. Twisted Martini opened at the Landing in late 2004.

Named after socialite and reality TV star Paris Hilton, Club Paris opened at the Jacksonville Landing in the summer of 2006, but it closed within a year. The 23-year obligation was finally resolved in 2010. The Jacksonville City Council passed a bill to give $3.5 million for Sleiman's purchase of a parking lot near the Landing. That money included a 20-year parking-validation program at a cost of $2.5 million to the city. Mayor John Peyton vetoed the bill, and the council voted unanimously to override the veto. Twisted Martini closed the same year.

On September 6, 2011, the Jacksonville Sheriff's Office Wally Banks played "Taps" at the end of a ceremony commemorating the 10-year anniversary of the 9/11 attacks. American Cafe closed permanently on October 25, 2011, and was immediately replaced with American Grill. In May 2018, the City of Jacksonville informed Jacksonville Landing Investments, LLC, a subsidiary of Sleiman Enterprises, that the Jacksonville Landing had defaulted on the lease by not curing a breach of contract within the 30 days of notification. The City of Jacksonville demanded immediate access and possession of the property.

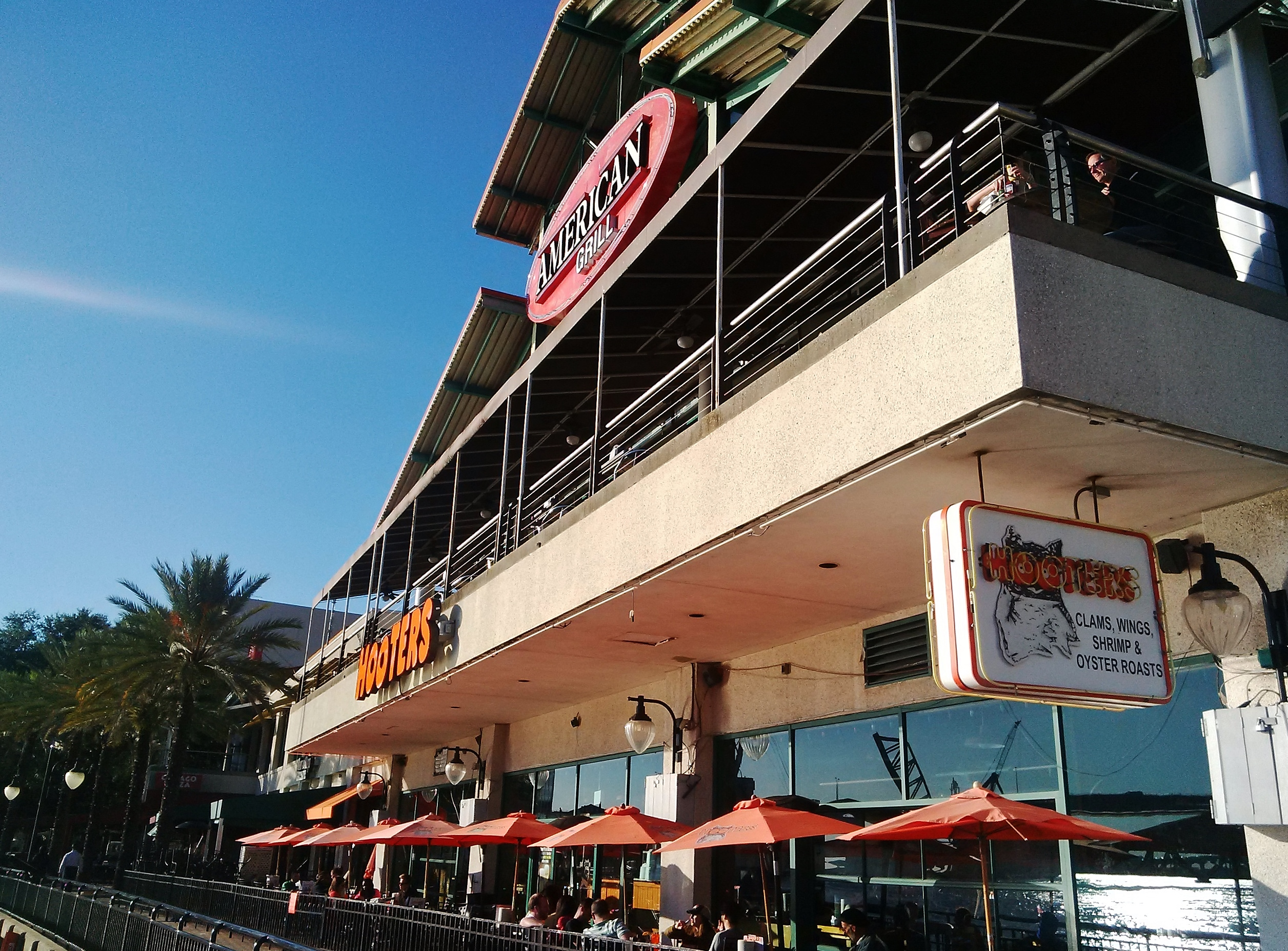
Hooters prior to renovations as viewed from the waterfront (June 2014). American Grill can be seen on the second floor.

Meanwhile, on June 29, 2018, Hooters reopened its renovated restaurant space in the Jacksonville Landing.

==== Summer 2018 mass shooting ====
A mass shooting occurred at the video-game tournament that was held on August 26, 2018, at the GLHF (Good Luck Have Fun) Game Bar in Chicago Pizza; three people, including the perpetrator, were killed, and others injured.

On November 9, 2018, after more eateries began leaving, Founders Food Hall closed completely, and management blocked and disabled the escalators. The city was also reported to be neglecting the Landing, despite the agreement to efficiently maintain the property.

== Redevelopment as Riverfront Plaza ==
Riverfront Plaza pre-construction

On February 20, 2019, the City of Jacksonville and Sleiman Enterprises reached an $18–million settlement to transfer ownership of Jacksonville Landing to the city. The agreement included $1.5 million to buy out the remaining tenants' leases, and another $1.5 million to demolish the mall for redevelopment of the site.

On May 1, 2019, the City of Jacksonville sent eviction letters to the remaining tenants of Jacksonville Landing, giving them 30 days to vacate the premises. The City of Jacksonville bought out the three remaining tenants' leases, paying $303,333.31 for the Hooters lease, $550,000 for the Fion MacCools lease, and $450,000 for the BBVA Compass Bank lease. BBVA had to vacate by October 28, 2019.

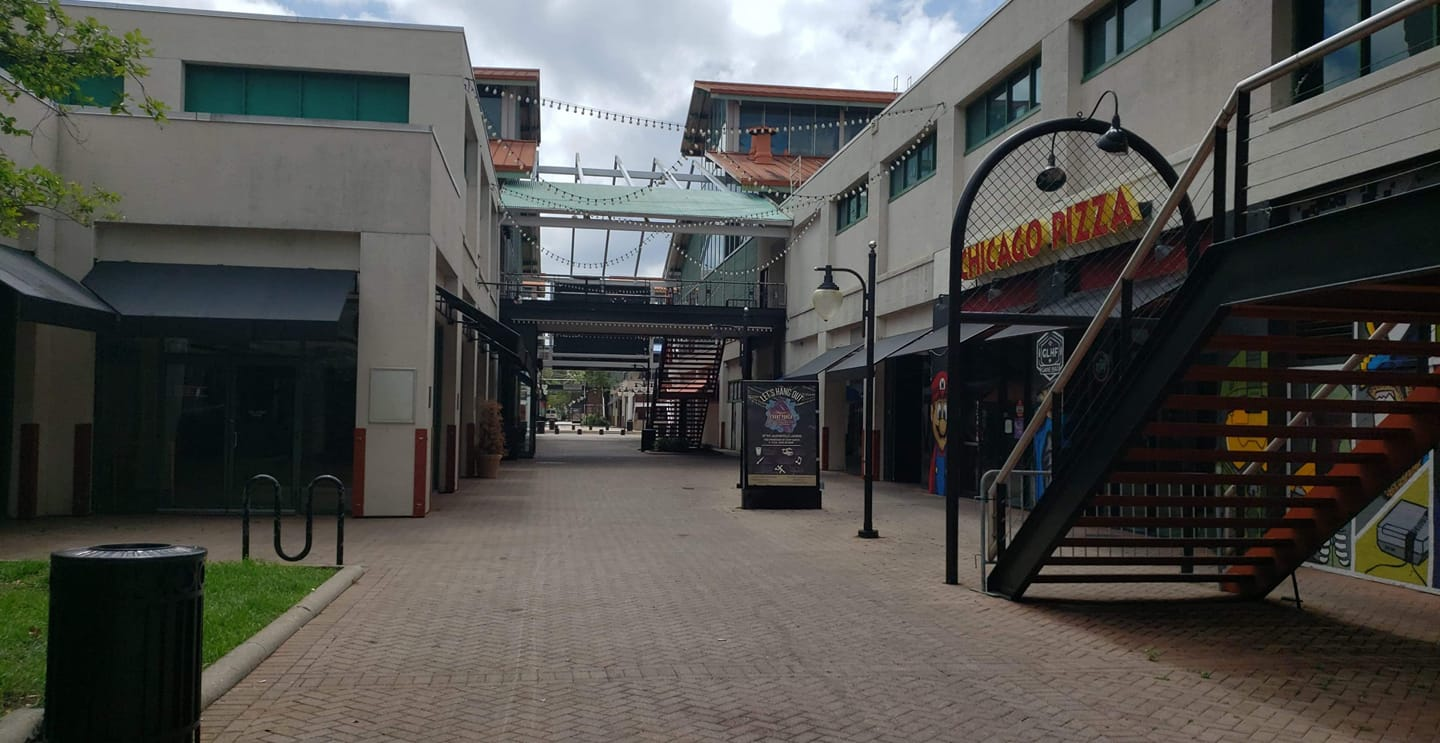
The Jacksonville Landing in June 2019. During this time, the mall was 99% vacant, with only one tenant remaining operational.

The city received demolition bids ranging from $978,200 to $2,776,000. Plant City–based D.H. Griffin bid $1.074 million to tear down the Landing; this was one of seven sealed bids received by the deadline, 2 p.m. on June 14, 2019. The Department of Public Works recommended this bid to the General Government Awards Committee, which approved it at its next meeting. D.H. Griffin was to start site work ten calendar days after the city sent the contractor a written notice to begin. The Landing wasn't officially fully closed until after July 4, because it was the primary viewing spot for the downtown Independence Day fireworks.

On August 5, 2019, it was reported that D.H. Griffin Wrecking Co. Inc, the company hired to demolish the Landing, would erect fences so that demolition work could begin. In August 2019, Mayor Lenny Curry discussed a plan to build housing, restaurants, and a museum at the site, staying "I think that those are the options that are on the table. What will happen is, as demolition happens, the Downtown Investment Authority will put out a request for proposal to the market to say, you know, to private investors, 'What would you like to do here? What can you do here?' My personal opinion is it should be a combination of some green space—not all, [for] we don't want just a park there—but a combination of some green space and then some sort of buildings that are iconic, that serve the public. It's an important piece of property. I also think [you] should...be able to see the river from Laura Street. We don't want to block the view of that wonderful jewel." Some citizens believe that the mayor didn't include them in the decision to demolish or renovate the Landing.

== Gallery ==
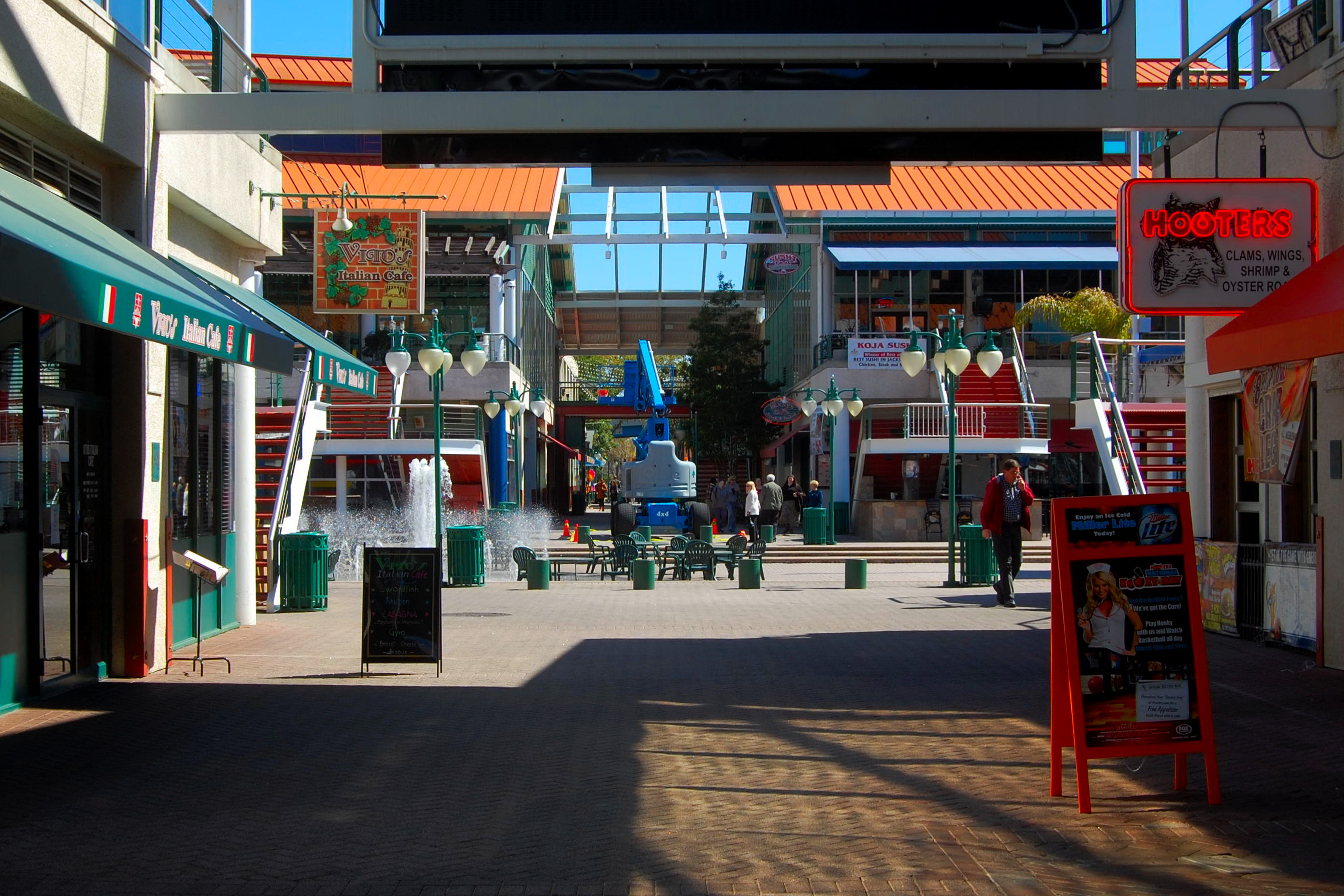
The mall's outdoor plaza in February 2010

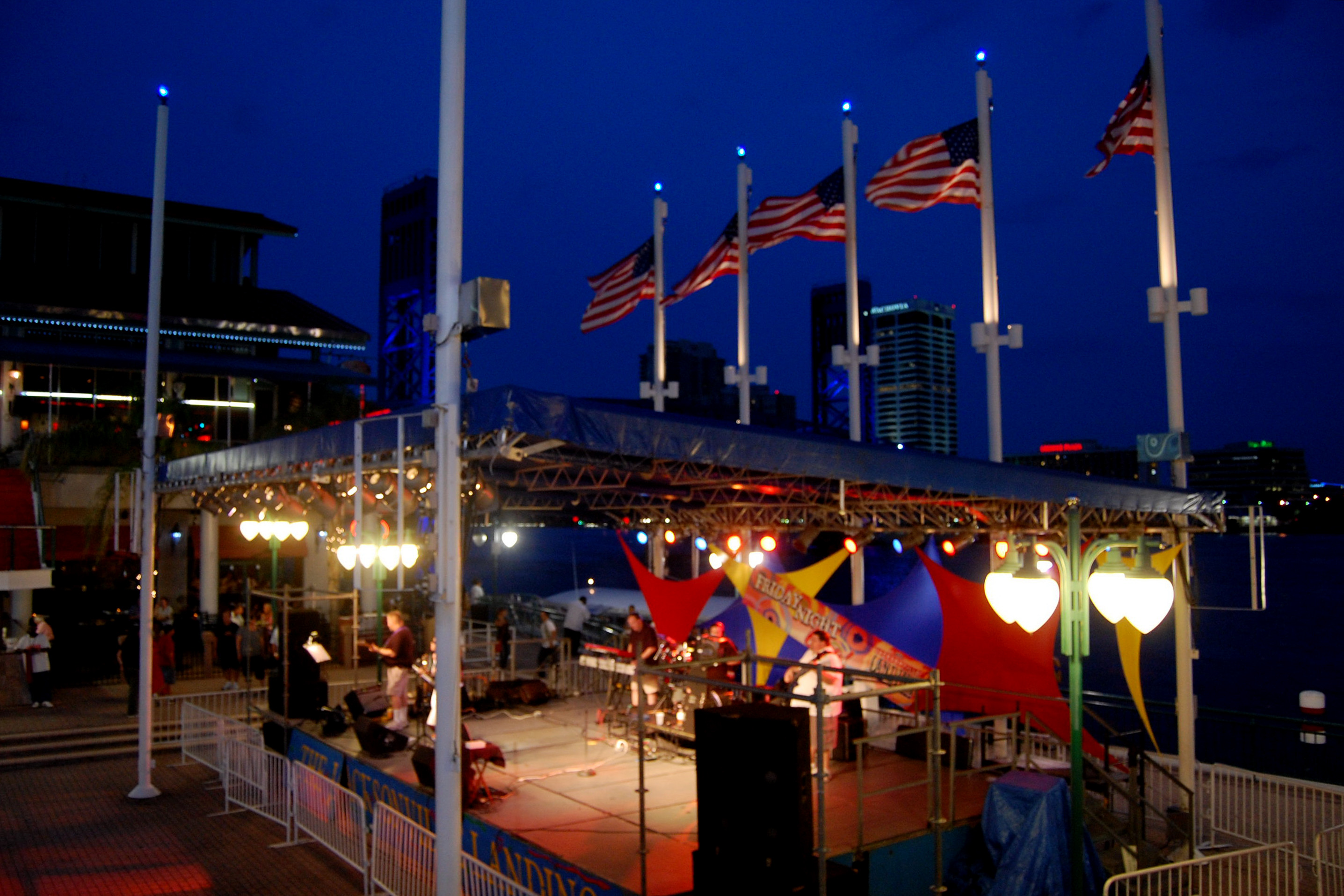
Waterfront stage at night (February 2010)

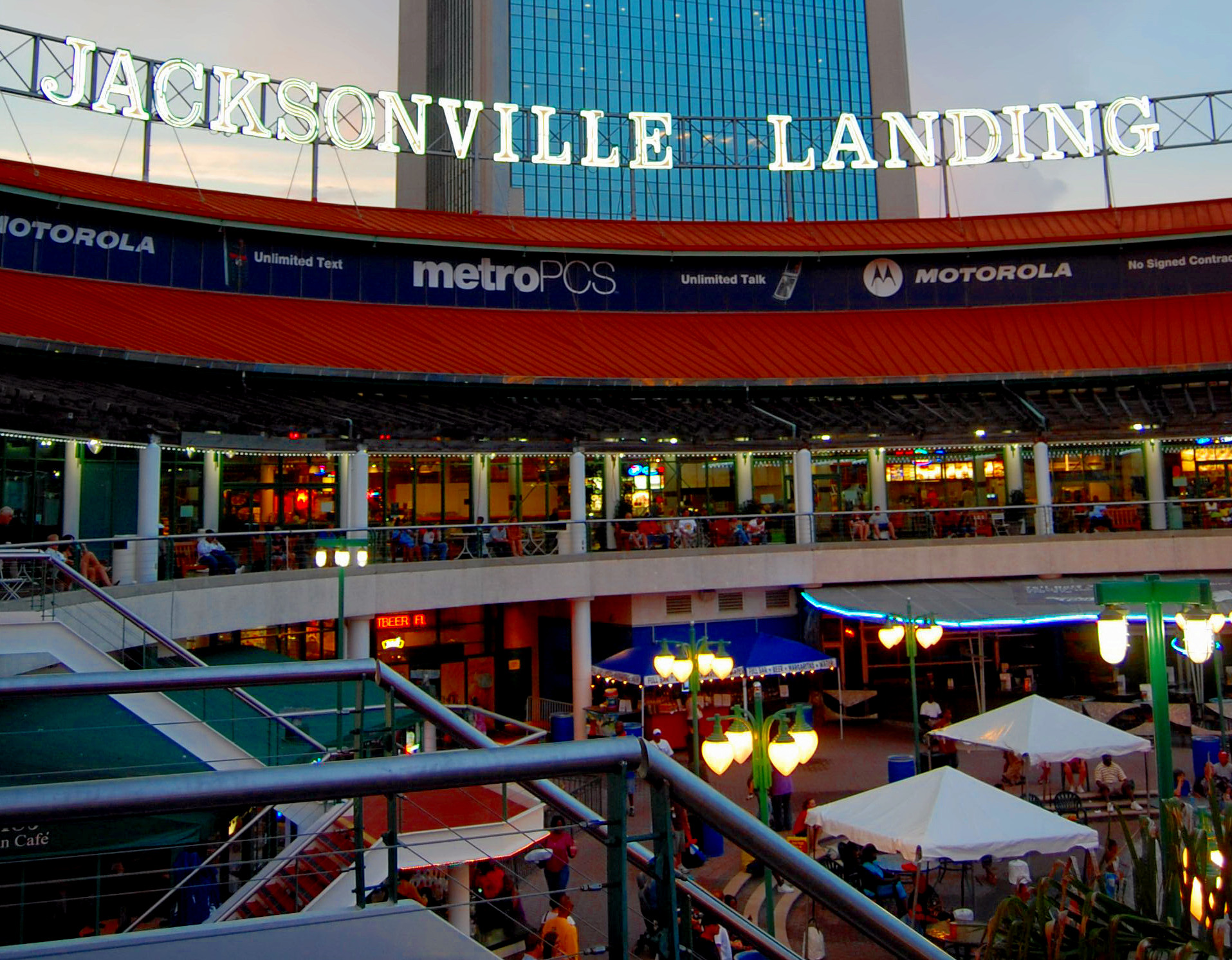
The Landing at sunset in February 2010

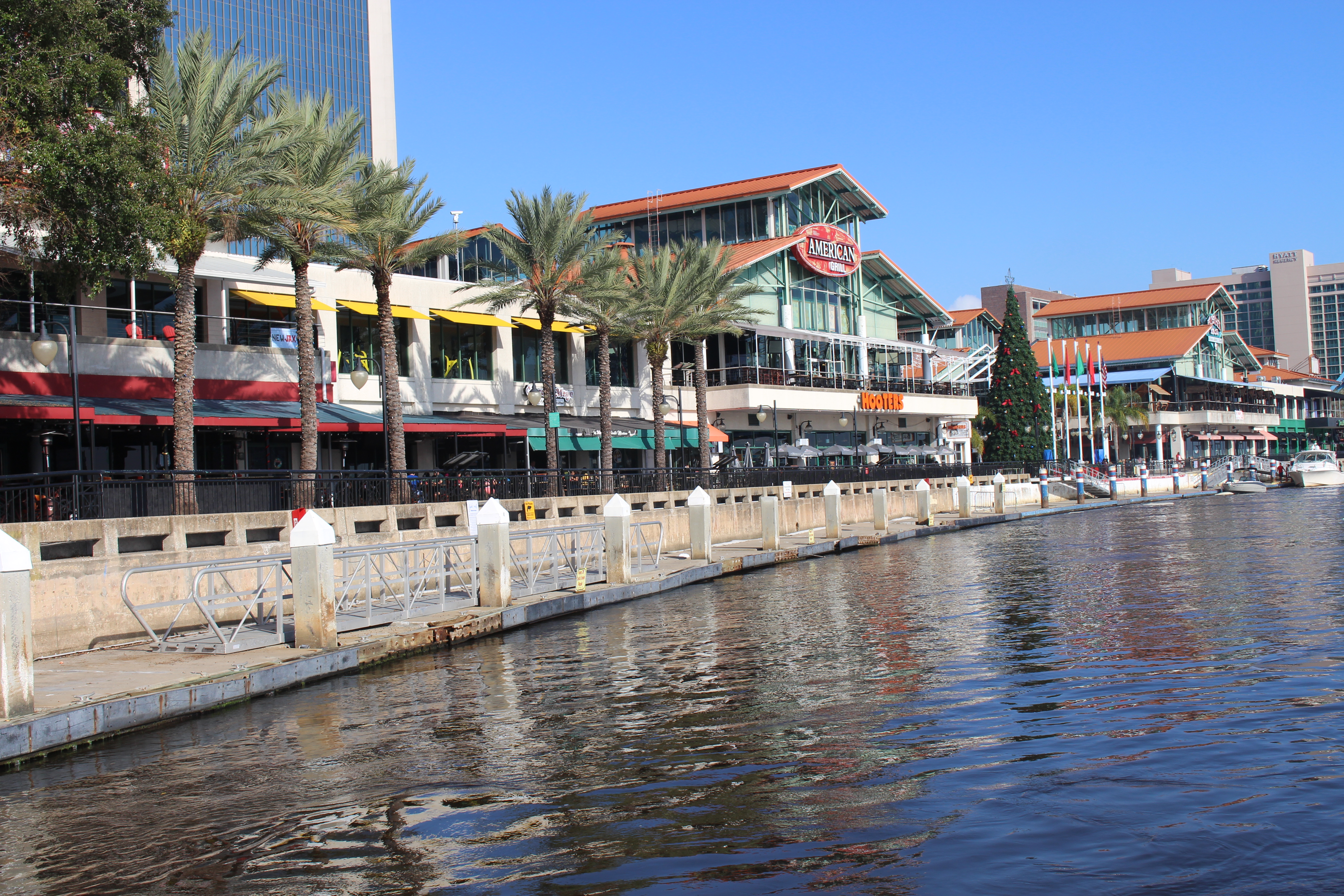
View of Jacksonville Landing from the river (December 2016)

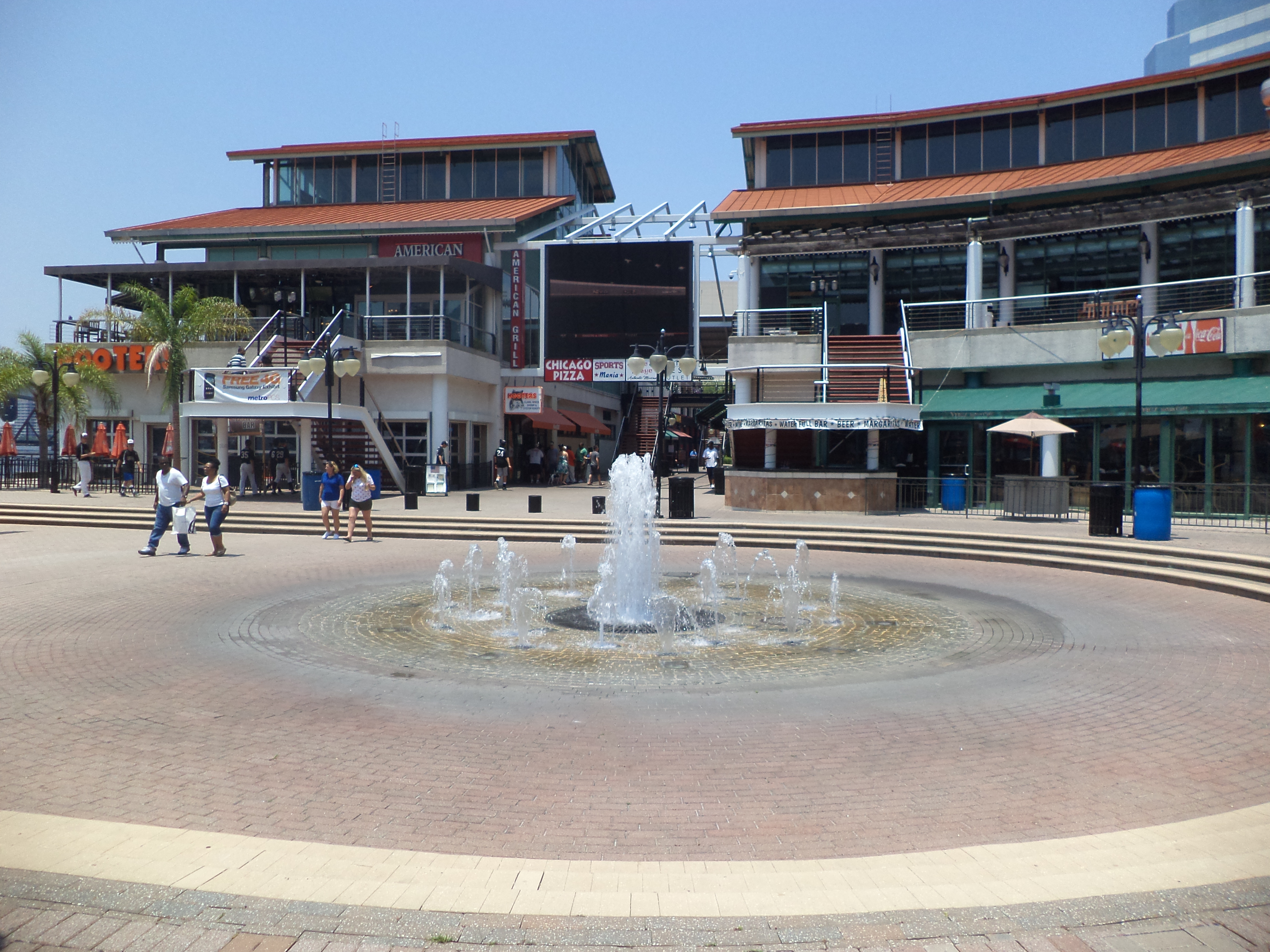
Looking West at Jacksonville Landing fountain

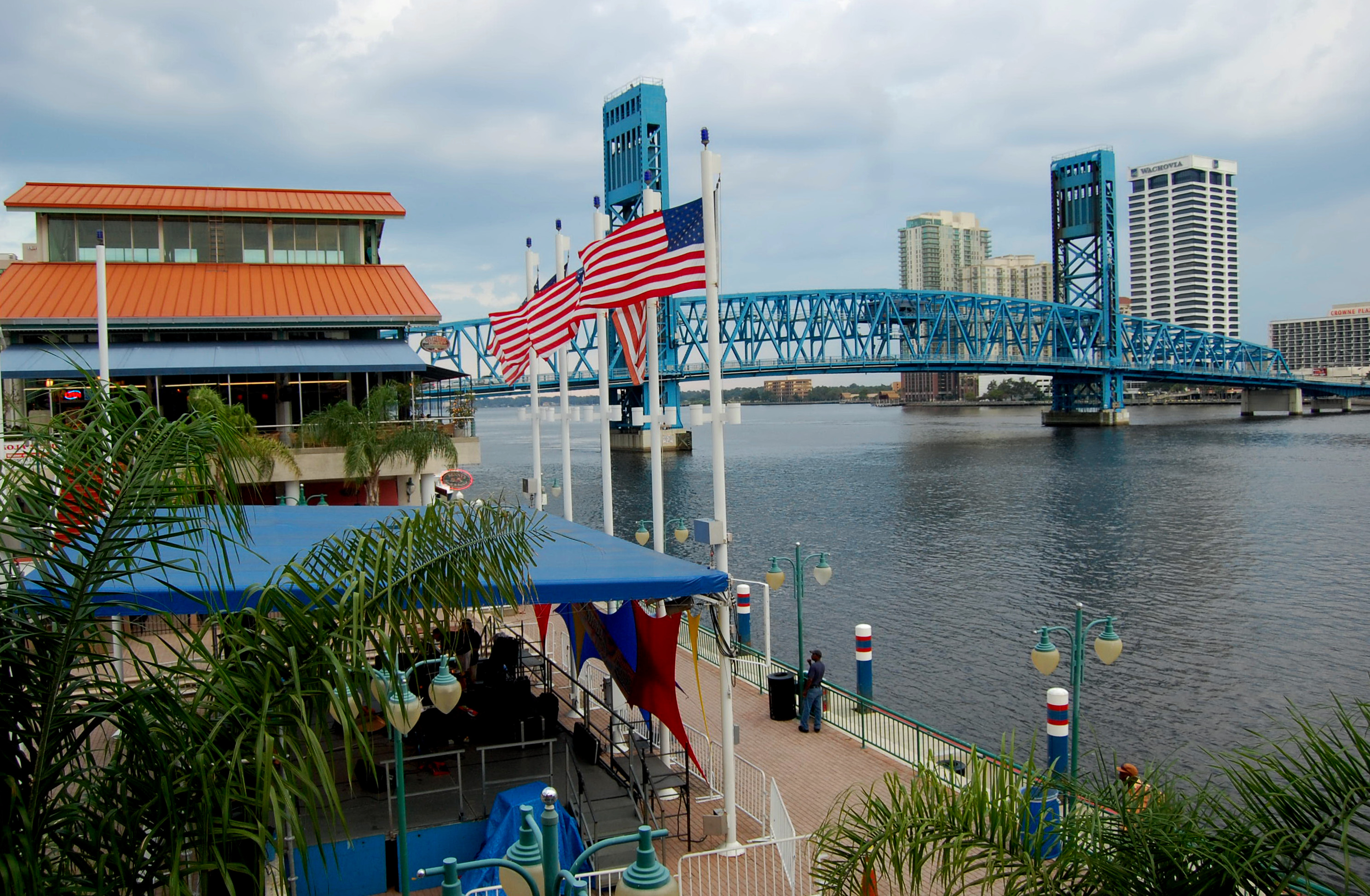
View of Main Street Bridge from the Jacksonville Landing

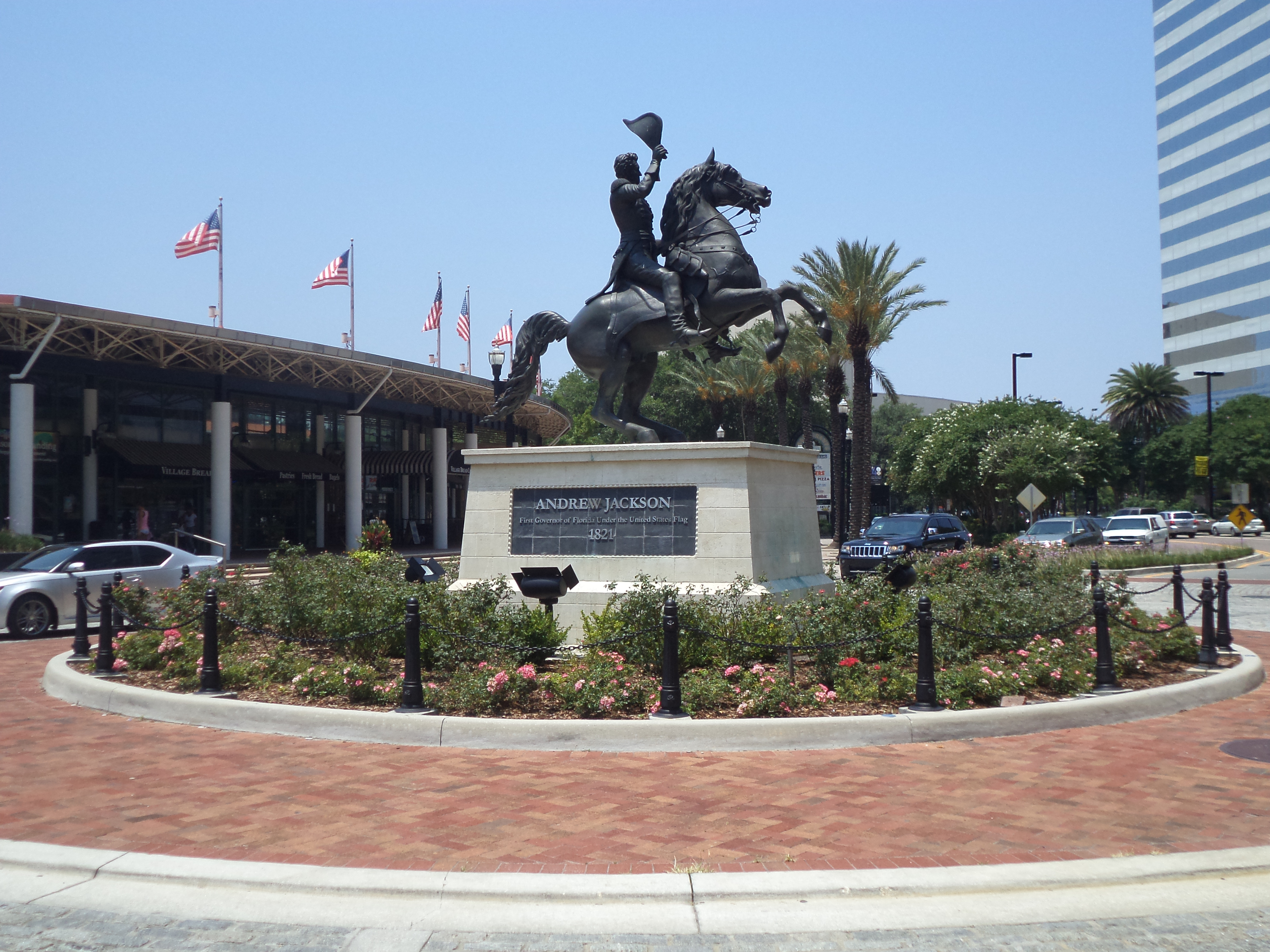
Statue of President Andrew Jackson in front of the marketplace

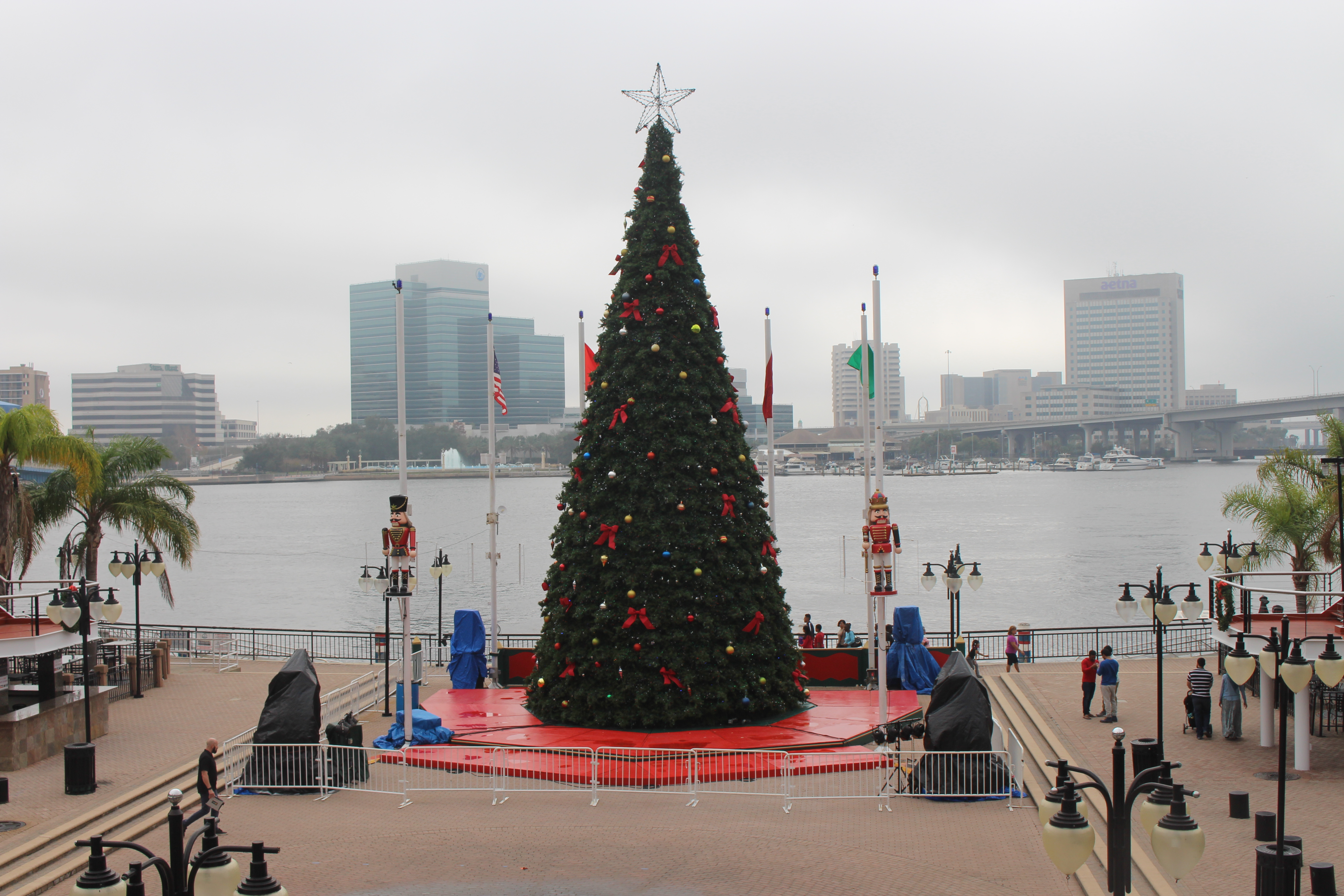
The December 2016 Christmas tree lighting located near the Acosta Bridge
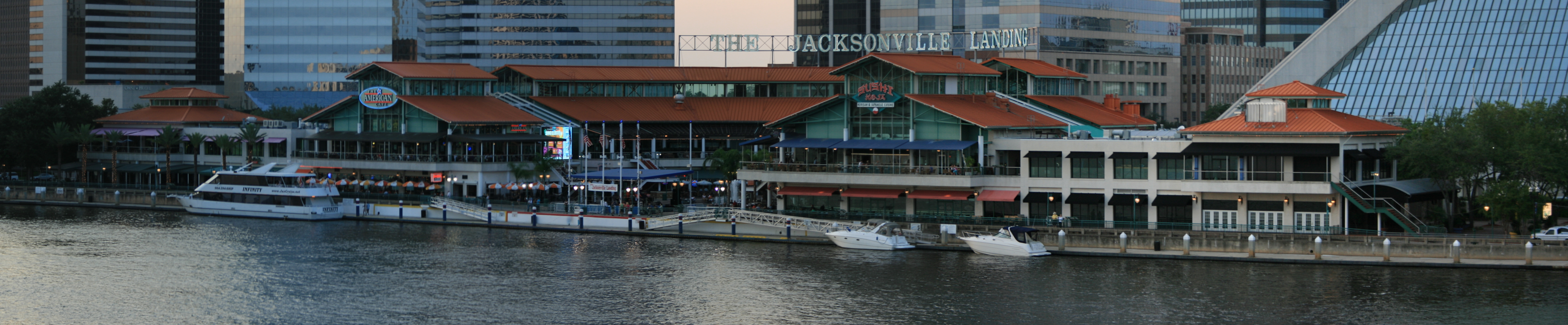
Panoramic view of the Landing at sunset

== See also ==
- Jacksonville Riverwalk
