= Landing Creek (South Dakota) =

Stream in South Dakota, U.S.

Coordinates: 43°27′47″N 99°18′37″W

Landing Creek is a stream in the U.S. state of South Dakota.

Landing Creek was the site of a riverboat landing, hence the name.

== See also ==
- List of rivers of South Dakota
