= List of attractions and events in Jacksonville, Florida =

The city of Jacksonville, Florida and the Jacksonville metropolitan area host numerous events year-round. This listing includes the most notable of those events.

== Annual events ==
Most events are coordinated through the City of Jacksonville, department of Recreation and Community Services.

=== January ===
- Gator Bowl

=== February ===
- Mardi Gras Jax
- World of Nations Celebration

=== March ===
- Amelia Island Concours d'Elegance
- Gate River Run
- Great Atlantic Seafood & Music Festival

=== April ===
- Blessing of the Fleet
- Jacksonville Jazz Festival
- Mandarin Art Festival
- One Spark
- Springing the Blues
- Starry Nights Concerts at Metropolitan Park
- Tree Hill Nature Center Butterfly Festival
- "Things We Don't Talk About - Women's Stories of the Red Tent" - Jacksonville premier
- Rockville

=== May ===
- Isle of Eight Flags Shrimp Festival
- Jacksonville Film Festival
- Mug Race
- Memorial Day at the Veterans Memorial Wall
- The Players Championship
- World of Nations Celebration

=== July ===
- Freedom, Fanfare & Fireworks
- Greater Jacksonville Kingfish Tournament
- Jacksonville Beach 4th of July Fireworks

=== October ===
- Florida vs. Georgia Football Classic
- Jacksonville Pride
- Jacksonville Sea & Sky Spectacular

=== November ===
- Greater Jacksonville Agricultural Fair
- Jacksonville Light Parade
- Northeast Florida Veg Fest
- Planetfest

== Churches ==
- Basilica of the Immaculate Conception
- Bethel Baptist Institutional Church
- Cathedral Basilica of St. Augustine
- Church of Our Saviour
- First Church of Christ, Scientist
- Mount Zion AME Church
- Riverside Baptist Church
- St. Andrews Episcopal Church
- St. John's Cathedral

== Event facilities ==
=== City owned ===
The city contracts with a company to manage and operate:

- Baseball Grounds of Jacksonville
- Jacksonville Municipal Stadium
- VyStar Veterans Memorial Arena
- Prime F. Osborn III Convention Center
- Ritz Theatre (Jacksonville)
- Times-Union Center for the Performing Arts
  - Jacoby Symphony Hall - home of Jacksonville Symphony
  - Jim & Jan Moran Theater - featuring touring Broadway theatre

Each entity that rents the venue is responsible for the event's operations:

- Daily's Place Amphitheater
- Cecil Recreation Complex
  - Jacksonville Equestrian Center
  - Jacksonville Aquatics Center
- Metropolitan Park
- Riverfront Plaza

=== Privately owned ===
- Adventure Landing
- Alhambra Dinner Theatre
- Catty Shack Ranch Wildlife Sanctuary
- Dave & Buster's
- Florida Theatre
- Hyatt Regency Jacksonville Riverfront
- Jacksonville Fairgrounds & Exposition Center
- Morocco Shrine Auditorium
- Ponte Vedra Concert Hall
- Riverside Theater
- Shipwreck Island
- St. Augustine Amphitheatre
- Theatre Jacksonville

== Historic homes ==
- Epping Forest
- Henry John Klutho House
- Lane-Towers House
- Napoleon Bonaparte Broward House

== Museums ==
- Alexander Brest Museum and Gallery
- Alexander Brest Planetarium
- Amelia Island Museum of History
- The Beaches Museum & History Center
- Black Heritage Museum
- Camp Blanding Museum and Memorial Park
- Castillo de San Marcos
- Jacksonville Fire Museum
- Clay County Historical Society Museum
- Cummer Museum of Art and Gardens
- Fort Caroline National Memorial
- Fort Clinch State Park
- Jacksonville Maritime Museum
- Jacksonville University Life Sciences Museum
- Karpeles Manuscript Museum
- Kingsley Plantation
- LaVilla Museum
- Mandarin Museum
- Merrill House Museum
- Middleburg Historical Museum
- Museum of Contemporary Art Jacksonville
- Museum of Science & History
- Museum of Southern History
- Nathan H. Wilson Center for the Arts
- Old Morocco Temple Building
- Old Jail Museum
- Oldest Wooden Schoolhouse
- Olustee Battlefield Historic State Park
- Potter's Wax Museum
- Ripley's Believe It or Not Museum
- St. Augustine Lighthouse & Museum
- St. Photios Greek Orthodox National Shrine
- Spanish Military Hospital Museum
- University Gallery at University of North Florida
- Villa Zorayda
- World Golf Hall of Fame

== Outdoor attractions ==
- The Atlantic Ocean at
  - Atlantic Beach, Florida
  - Jacksonville Beach, Florida
  - Neptune Beach, Florida
  - Ponte Vedra Beach, Florida
- Jacksonville Arboretum & Gardens
- Jacksonville Riverwalk
  - Friendship Fountain
- Jacksonville Zoo and Gardens
- Palm and Cycad Arboretum
- St. Augustine Alligator Farm Zoological Park
- St. Augustine Lighthouse
- Treaty Oak
- Tree Hill Nature Center

== Parks ==
Jacksonville operates the largest urban park system in the United States, providing facilities and services at more than 337 locations on more than 80,000 acres (320 km^{2}) located throughout the city. Memorial Park and Metropolitan Park; Riverside Park and Riverfront Plaza are located on the St. Johns River or have beaches on the Atlantic Ocean, such as Hanna Park. In addition to municipal parks, are ten state parks and five national facilities in the area. Jacksonville is home to the world's oldest continually-operated skatepark, Kona Skatepark. There is an 18-hole disk golf course in Klutho Park and a nature park on the Intracoastal waterway at Castaway Island Preserve. The longest park is the 14.5-mile (23.3 km) Jacksonville-Baldwin Rail Trail and the Treaty Oak is the oldest living thing in Jacksonville. Friendship Fountain was the world's tallest fountain when it opened in 1965. Jacksonville Riverwalks are on both sides of the river in the downtown area.

=== State ===
- Amelia Island State Park
- Anastasia State Park
- Big Talbot Island State Park
- Fort Clinch State Park
- Fort George Island Cultural State Park
- George Crady Bridge Fishing Pier State Park
- Little Talbot Island State Park
- Olustee Battlefield Historic State Park
- Pumpkin Hill Creek Preserve State Park
- Yellow Bluff Fort Historic State Park

=== National ===
- Castillo de San Marcos National Monument
- Fort Caroline National Memorial
- Fort Matanzas National Monument
- Jacksonville National Cemetery
- Kingsley Plantation

== Shopping venues ==
- Avenues Mall
- Regency Square Mall
- River City Marketplace
- St. Augustine Outlet Mall
- St. Johns Town Center

== Sports facilities ==
=== Baseball ===
- Alexander Brest Field - home of the Jacksonville Dolphins
- VyStar Ballpark (formerly Baseball Grounds of Jacksonville) - home of the Jacksonville Jumbo Shrimp
- Harmon Stadium - home of the North Florida Ospreys

=== Basketball ===
- VyStar Veterans Memorial Arena - home of the Jacksonville Giants
- Swisher Gymnasium - home of the Jacksonville Dolphins
- UNF Arena - home of the North Florida Ospreys

=== Football ===
- Bolles School Stadium - home of the Jacksonville Dixie Blues
- D. B. Milne Field - home of the Jacksonville Dolphins
- EverBank Stadium - home of the Jacksonville Jaguars
- Hodges Stadium - home of the North Florida Ospreys and Jacksonville Axemen
- VyStar Veterans Memorial Arena - home of the Jacksonville Sharks and Jacksonville Icemen

=== Golf ===
The Greater Jacksonville Metropolitan Area boasts 64 golf courses, of which 18 are public, 18 are semi-private, 15 are private and 13 are resort courses. All are within a one-hour drive of downtown Jacksonville.

=== Soccer and rugby ===
- Hodges Stadium - home of the North Florida Ospreys and Jacksonville Axemen

=== Other ===
- Cecil Recreation Complex
  - Cecil Aquatics center
  - Cecil Equestrian center
  - Cecil Fastpitch Softball
- Jacksonville Ice - home of the Jacksonville RollerGirls
- Kona Skatepark
