= North Florida =

Region in Florida

- Region
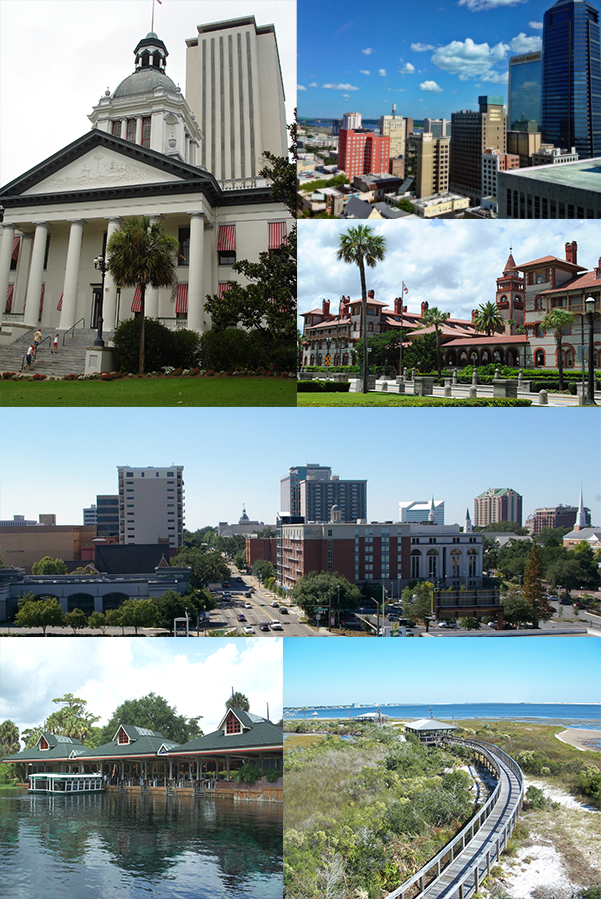
- Top left to right: Florida State Capitol in Tallahassee, Downtown Jacksonville, Flagler College, Tallahassee skyline Bottom left to right: Silver Springs Nature Theme Park, and Big Lagoon State Park

- Country: United States
- State: Florida
- Largest city: Jacksonville

Population (2010)
  - Total: 3,753,144 (approximate area)

North Florida is a region of the U.S. state of Florida comprising the northernmost part of the state. Along with South Florida and Central Florida, it is one of Florida's three most common "directional" regions. It includes Jacksonville and nearby localities in Northeast Florida, an interior region known as North Central Florida, and the Florida Panhandle. North Florida is considered to be part of the Southern United States, namely the Deep South, and contains the state capital of Tallahassee.

== Geography ==
=== Area ===
As with many vernacular regions, North Florida does not have any officially designated boundaries or status, and is defined differently in different sources. A 2007 study of Florida's regions by geographers Ary Lamme and Raymond K. Oldakowski found that Floridians surveyed identified "North Florida" as comprising the northernmost areas of the state, including both the peninsula and the Florida Panhandle. Additionally, two localized "directional" regions had emerged: North East Florida, also known as the "First Coast", representing the area around Jacksonville on the Atlantic coast, and North Central Florida, comprising the central area. North Florida is one of Florida's three most common directional regions, along with Central Florida and South Florida. The region includes smaller vernacular regions, particularly along the coast, including the Emerald Coast and the Big Bend on the Gulf Coast and the First Coast and Halifax area on the Atlantic. Lamme and Oldakowski note that the directional region is more commonly used in the interior areas than on the coast.

Enterprise Florida, the state's economic development agency, divides the state into three economic regions, used within the agency and other state and outside entities, including the Florida Department of Transportation. They identify three regions within the area identified as "North Florida" by Enterprise Florida: Northeast Florida, North Central Florida, and Northwest Florida (representing most of the Panhandle).

=== Regions ===
The following regions are entirely or partly within Northern Florida:

Directional regions:

- Northeast Florida
- North Central Florida
- Northwest Florida

Metropolitan areas:

- Jacksonville
- Pensacola
- Tallahassee
- Gainesville
- Ocala
- Fort Walton Beach
- Panama City
- Palm Coast

Vernacular regions:

- Big Bend
- Emerald Coast
- First Coast
- Florida Panhandle
- Forgotten Coast
- Halifax area
- Nature Coast

=== Cityscapes ===
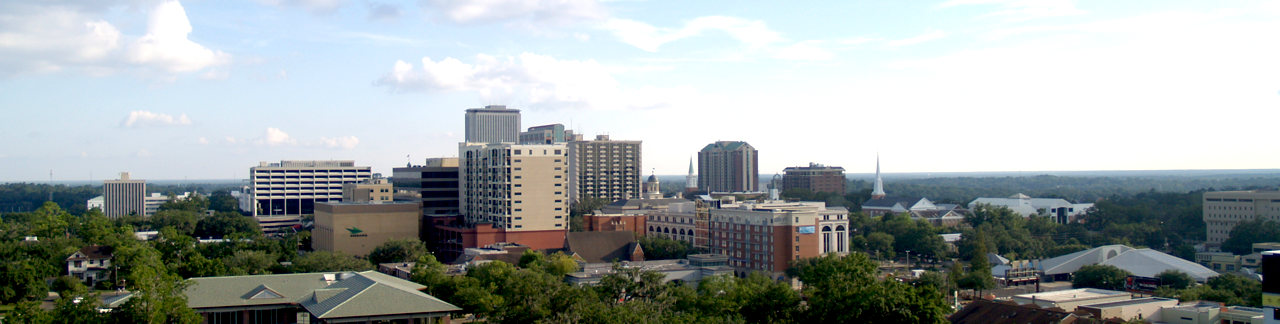
Tallahassee, the capital of the State of Florida.
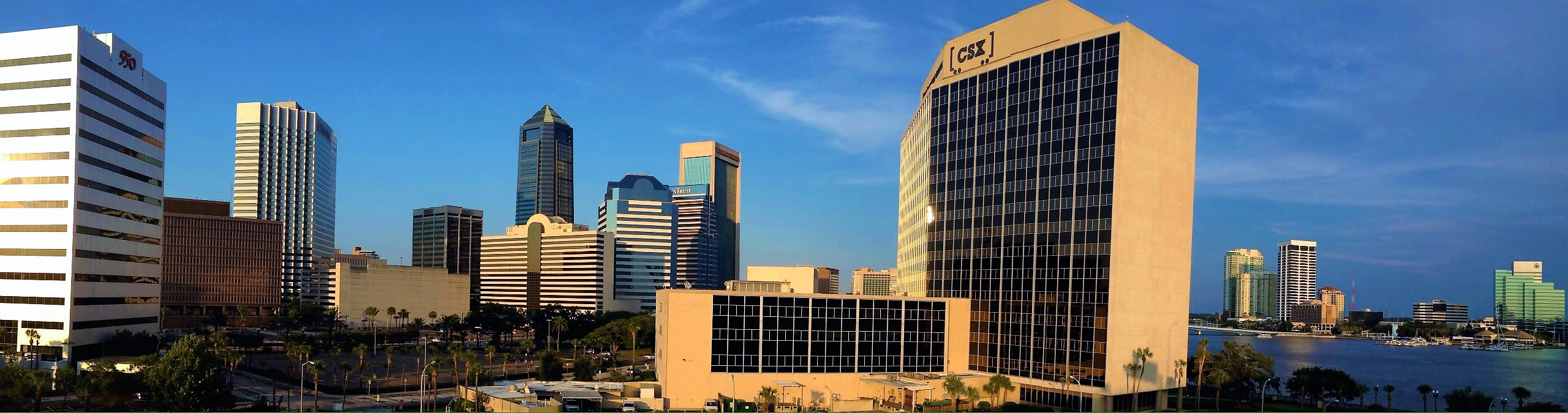
Jacksonville, the most populous city proper in the Southeast, and twelfth most populous in the United States.
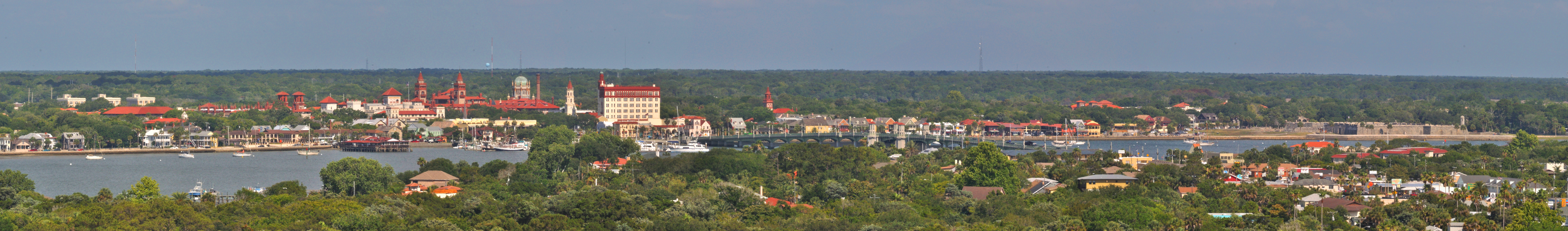
St. Augustine, the oldest continuously occupied European-established settlement and port in the continental United States.

=== Climate ===
Average High and Low temperatures for various North Florida Cities °F (°C)
City	Jan	Feb	Mar	Apr	May	Jun	Jul	Aug	Sep	Oct	Nov	Dec
Jacksonville	65/42 (18.3/5.5)	66/45 (18.8/7.2)	73/50 (22.7/10.0)	79/55 (26.1/12.7)	86/63 (30.0/17.2)	90/70 (32.2/21.1)	92/73 (33.3/22.7)	91/73 (32.7/22.7)	87/69 (30.5/20.5)	80/61 (26.6/16.1)	74/51 (23.3/7.2)	67/44 (19.4/6.6)
Pensacola	61/43 (16.1/6.1)	64/46 (17.7/7.7)	70/51 (21.1/10.5)	76/58 (24.4/14.4)	84/66 (28.8/18.8)	89/72 (31.6/22.2)	90/74 (32.2/23.3)	90/74 (32.2/23.3)	87/70 (30.5/21.1)	80/60 (26.6/15.5)	70/50 (21.1/10.0)	63/45 (17.2/7.2)
Tallahassee	64/39 (17.7/3.8)	68/40 (20.0/4.4)	72/47 (22.2/8.3)	80/52 (26.6/11.1)	87/62 (30.5/16.6)	91/70 (32.7/21.1)	92/72 (33.3/22.2)	92/72 (33.3/22.2)	89/68 (31.6/20.0)	82/57 (27.7/13.8)	73/48 (22.7/8.8)	66/41 (18.8/5.0)

== Demographics ==
Jacksonville is the largest metropolitan area in North Florida. Its cities include St. Augustine, Orange Park, and Fernandina Beach, this area is sometimes referred to as the First Coast. Other metropolitan areas include Pensacola-Ferry Pass-Brent, Tallahassee, Gainesville, Crestview-Fort Walton Beach-Destin, Panama City-Lynn Haven, and Palm Coast. Important cities considered micropolitan areas include Lake City and Palatka.

=== Largest cities by population ===
City	2020 population	2010 population	County
Jacksonville	949,611	821,784	Duval
Tallahassee	196,169	181,376	Leon
Gainesville	141,085	124,354	Alachua
Palm Coast	89,258	75,180	Flagler
Ocala	63,591	56,707	Marion
Pensacola	54,312	51,923	Escambia
Panama City	32,939	36,484	Bay
Jacksonville Beach	23,830	21,362	Duval
St. Augustine	14,329	12,975	St. Johns

== Culture ==
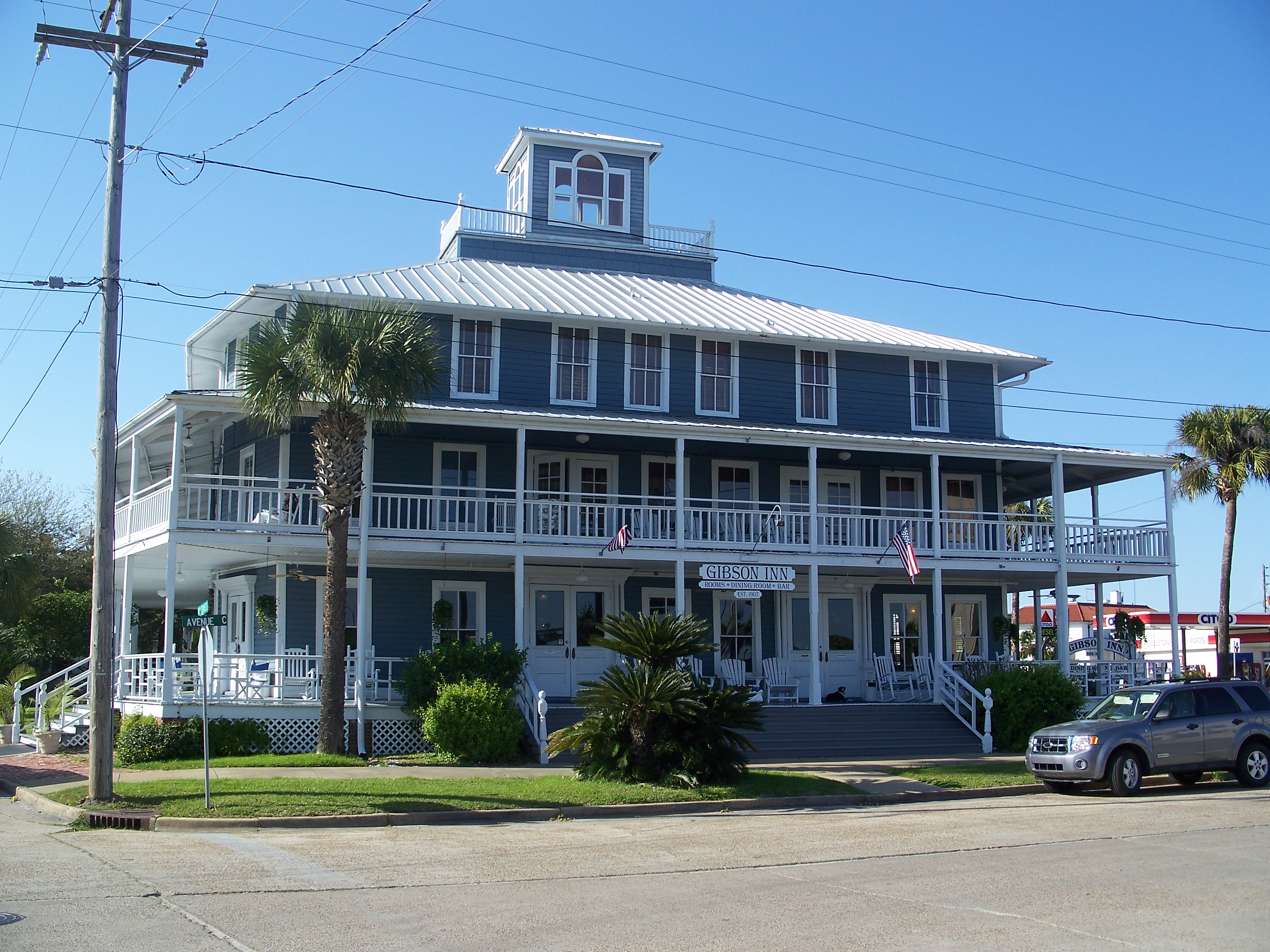
Historic Gibson Inn, Apalachicola, Florida, built in 1907.

Lamme and Oldakowski's survey identifies several demographic, political, and cultural elements that characterize North Florida and distinguish it from other areas of the state. North Floridians considered North Florida to be part of the South and "Dixie". Additionally, residents of some parts of North Florida considered their area to be in the Bible Belt, while residents of other parts of the state did not. A popular expression of people in this region of the state goes "In Florida, the farther north you go, the farther South you are."

Politically, in contrast to Central Florida, where a majority considered their part of the state moderate, and South Florida, which was more liberal, residents of North Florida overwhelmingly (76%) considered their part of the state conservative; 16% considered it moderate and 8% considered it liberal. Lamme and Oldakowski's findings track with Barney Warf and Cynthia Waddell's studies of Florida's political geography during the 2000 Presidential election.

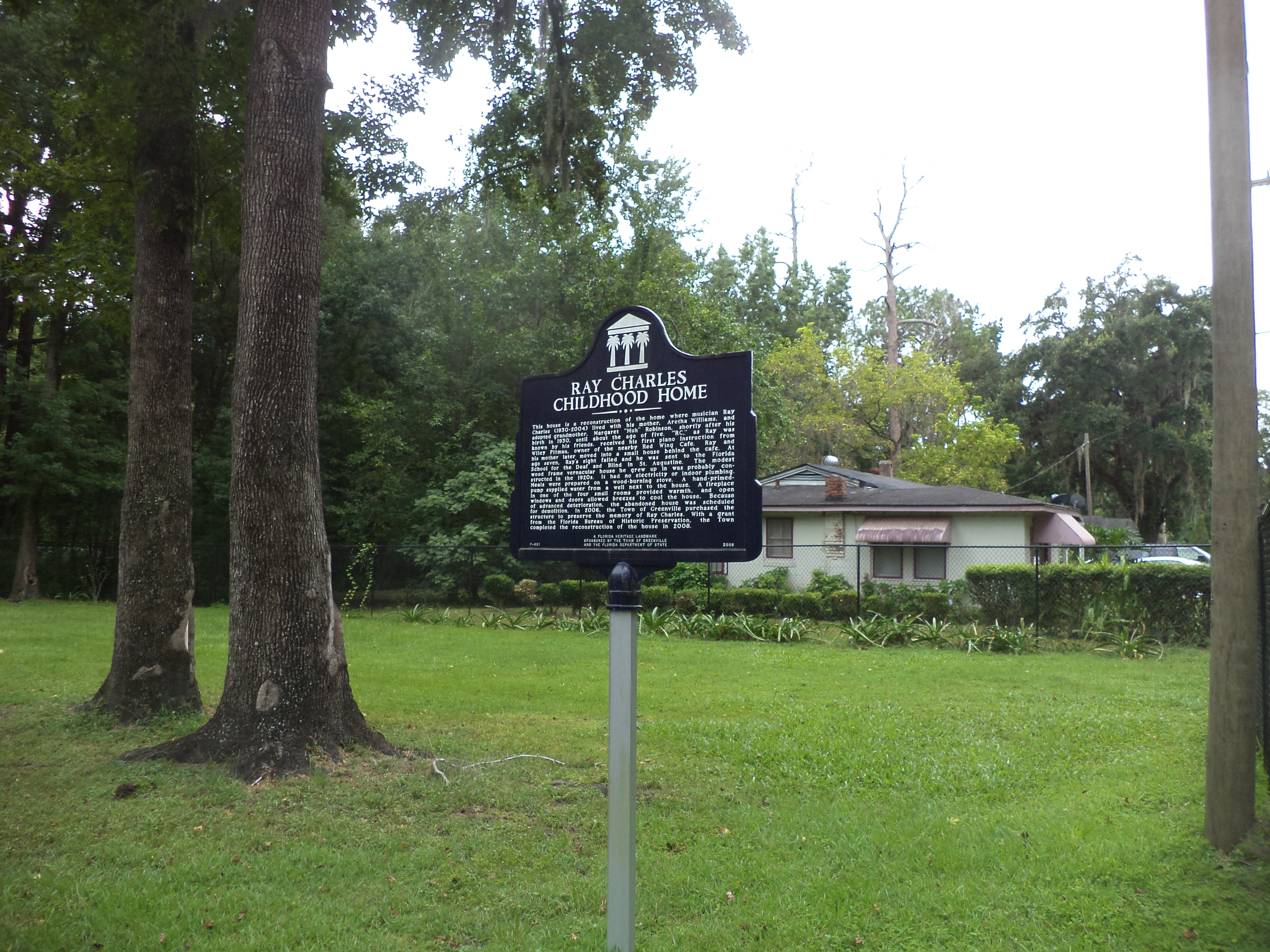
Located in North Florida is Ray Charles, American singer-songwriter, musician, and composer's childhood home, Greenville, Madison County, Florida.

Lamme and Oldakowski's survey also found some cultural indicators that characterize North Florida. In general, North Florida was similar to Central Florida and differed from South Florida in these measures. In North and Central Florida, American cuisine was the most popular food, in contrast to South Florida, where ethnic foods were equally popular. Additionally, while there was little geographical variation for most styles of music, there was regional variation for both country and Latin music. Country was popular in North and Central Florida, and less so in South Florida, while Latin was less popular in North and Central Florida, and more so in South Florida.

== Economy ==
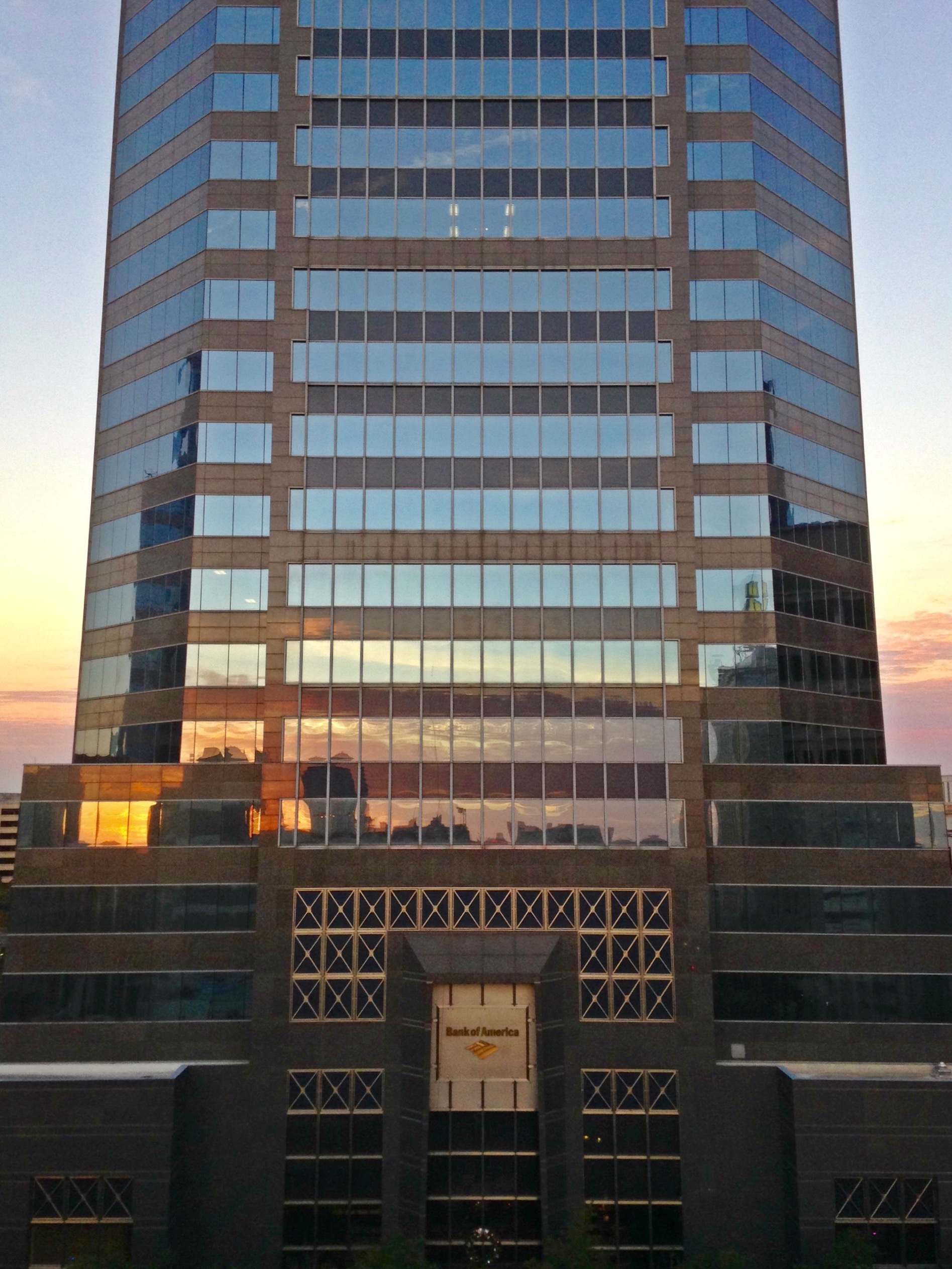
Bank of America Tower located on Laura Street, in Jacksonville's financial district

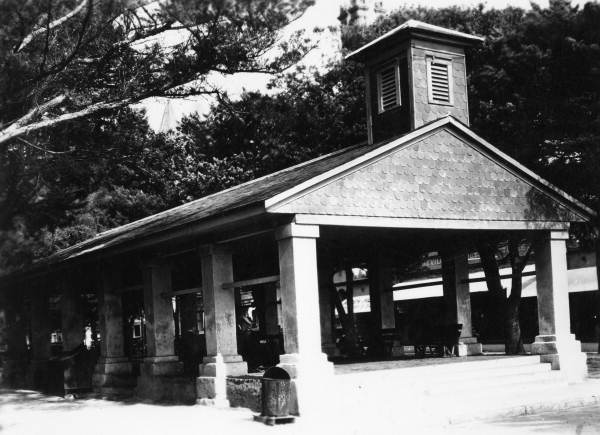
Old Slave Market, Saint Augustine, Florida

Lamme and Oldakowski noted that North Florida's economy was much more diversified than Central and South Florida, where tourism was by far the most significant industry. While tourism was a significant factor in North Florida's economy, particularly in the Emerald Coast, other important industries included agriculture in rural areas, education in Tallahassee and Gainesville, and military and finance in Jacksonville.

Major military bases in the region include the Pensacola Naval Air Station, Jacksonville Naval Air Station, Camp Blanding, Naval Station Mayport, Corry Station Naval Technical Training Center, Naval Support Activity Panama City, Blount Island Command, Eglin Air Force Base and Hurlburt Field.

Major attractions include the Big Kahuna's, Marineland of Florida, Florida State Capitol, World Golf Village, Historic Pensacola Village, and historic sites in St. Augustine. North Florida also has a wide variety of natural attractions including the Ravine Gardens State Park, Big Lagoon State Park, Osceola National Forest, and Timucuan Ecological and Historic Preserve. North Florida also has three major zoos, the Jacksonville Zoo and Gardens, St. Augustine Alligator Farm Zoological Park and Gulf Breeze Zoo.

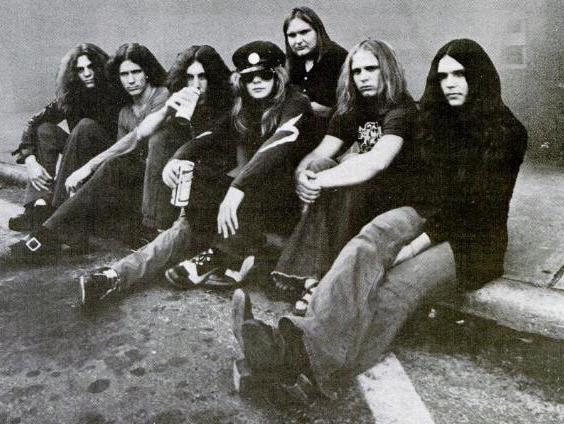
North Florida was the birthplace of the Southern Rock band Lynyrd Skynyrd. Inducted into the Rock and Roll Hall of Fame on March 13, 2006, the band's lead singer, Ronnie Van Zant was born & raised in Jacksonville, Florida.

Major malls and shopping districts include The Avenues, Butler Plaza, Five Points, Gateway Town Center, Governor's Square, The Oaks Mall, Orange Park Mall, Paddock Mall, Pier Park, Regency Square, River City Marketplace, St. Johns Town Center and University Town Plaza.

=== Major business districts ===
The following are major central business districts:

- Downtown Jacksonville
- Downtown Pensacola
- Downtown Tallahassee

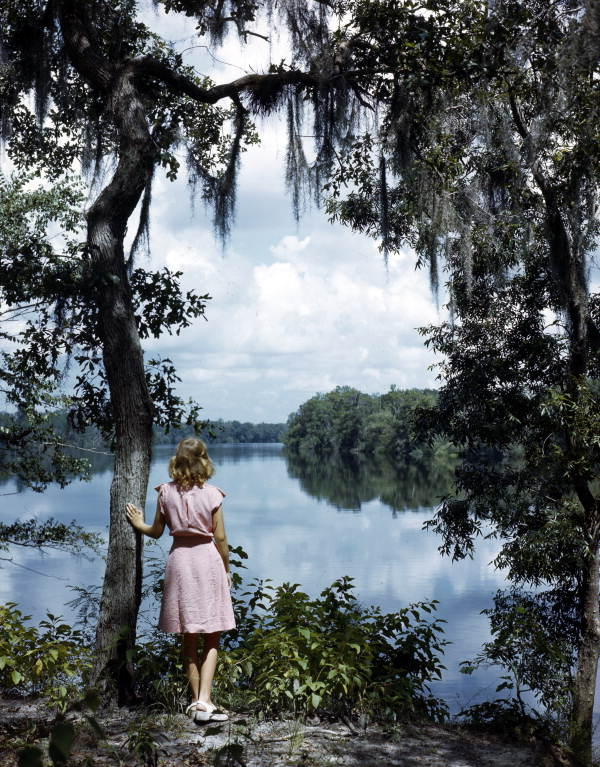
The Suwannee River, is a blackwater river that runs through North Florida and is about 246 miles (396 km) long. The Suwannee River is the site of the prehistoric Suwanee Straits which separated peninsular Florida from the panhandle.

=== Notable companies ===
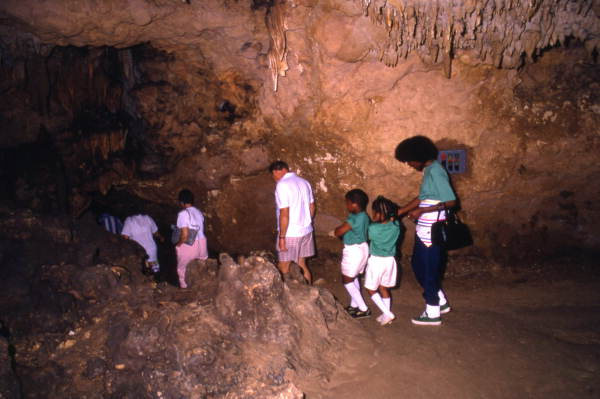
In North Florida is Florida Caverns State Park, Marianna, Florida.

Thousands of companies are headquartered in North Florida. Among those, the following 4 are in the Fortune 1000:

- CSX Corporation
- Fidelity National Financial
- FIS
- Landstar System

Additional notable companies headquartered (or with a significant presence) in North Florida include (some defunct or subsumed):

- AirScan
- All Pro Sound
- Ameris Bancorp
- Atlantic.net
- Bear Archery
- Black Knight
- Bloch Publishing Company
- Caribiana Sea Skiffs
- Crowley Maritime
- Elkins Constructors
- EnCor Biotechnology
- Fanatics
- Firehouse Subs
- FRP Holdings
- Florida Blue
- Florida East Coast Railway
- Gate Petroleum
- Gulf Power Company
- Haskell Company
- Huckins Yacht Corporation
- KBJ Architects
- Larry's Giant Subs
- M. D. Moody & Sons
- Mac Papers
- MedMal Direct Insurance Company
- Patriot Transportation
- PGA Tour
- Rayonier
- Rayonier Advanced Materials
- Regency Centers
- Reynolds, Smith & Hills
- Ring Power
- Safariland
- St. Joe Company
- St. Vincent's HealthCare
- Sally Corporation
- Seward Trunk Co.
- Southeastern Grocers
- Stein Mart
- Stellar Group
- Swisher International Group
- Trailer Bridge
- Trendy Entertainment
- VyStar Credit Union
- Web.com

== Parks and other protected areas ==
=== National Monuments and other federally protected areas ===
Areas under federal protection include Castillo de San Marcos National Monument, Fort Matanzas National Monument, Fort Caroline National Memorial, Gulf Islands National Seashore, and Timucuan Ecological and Historic Preserve. National forests occupy large sections of North Florida, including the Apalachicola National Forest, Choctawhatchee National Forest and Osceola National Forest.

=== Other parks and protected areas ===
- Waccasassa Bay Preserve State Park
- Paynes Prairie
- Ocala National Forest
- Torreya State Park
- Yellow River Marsh
- George Crady Bridge Fishing Pier State Park
- San Felasco Hammock Preserve State Park
- Faver-Dykes State Park
- O'Leno State Park
- Dunns Creek
- Edward Ball Wakulla Springs State Park
- Cedar Key Scrub State Reserve
- Silver Springs State Park
- Econfina River State Park
- River Rise Preserve State Park
- Tarkiln Bayou
- Bald Point State Park
- Pumpkin Hill Creek Preserve State Park
- St. Marks River State Park
- Ichetucknee Springs State Park
- Grayton Beach State Park
- Ochlockonee River State Park
- Fred Gannon Rocky Bayou State Park
- Orman House
- John Gorrie State Museum
- Dudley Farm
- Perdido Key State Park
- Amelia Island State Park
- Henderson Beach State Park
- Letchworth Mounds Archaeological State Park
- Camp Helen State Park
- Falling Waters State Park
- Eden Gardens State Park
- Gamble Rogers Memorial State Recreation Area
- Natural Bridge Battlefield Historic State Park
- Lake Jackson Mounds Archaeological State Park
- Marjorie Kinnan Rawlings Historic State Park
- Troy Spring State Park
- Devil's Millhopper Geological State Park
- Ravine Gardens State Park
- Olustee Battlefield Historic State Park
- Fort Mose Historic State Park
- Washington Oaks State Gardens
- Cedar Key Museum State Park
- San Marcos de Apalache Historic State Park
- Gainesville-Hawthorne Trail State Park
- Forest Capital Museum State Park
- Constitution Convention Museum State Park
- DeSoto Site Historic State Park
- Madison Blue Springs State Park
- Mike Roess Gold Head Branch State Park
- Deer Lake State Park
- St. George Island State Park
- St. Joseph Peninsula State Park
- Suwannee River State Park
- Topsail Hill Preserve State Park
- Anastasia State Park
- Big Talbot Island State Park
- Fort George Island Cultural State Park
- Little Talbot Island State Park
- Yellow Bluff Fort Historic State Park
- Rainbow Springs State Park
- Fanning Springs State Park
- Fort Clinch State Park
- Florida Caverns State Park
- St. Andrews State Park
- Alfred B. Maclay Gardens State Park
- Stephen Foster Folk Culture Center State Park
- Wes Skiles Peacock Springs State Park
- Big Lagoon State Park
- Lafayette Blue Springs State Park
- Three Rivers State Park
- Blackwater River State Park
- Lake Talquin
- Ponce de Leon Springs State Park

== Educational institutions ==
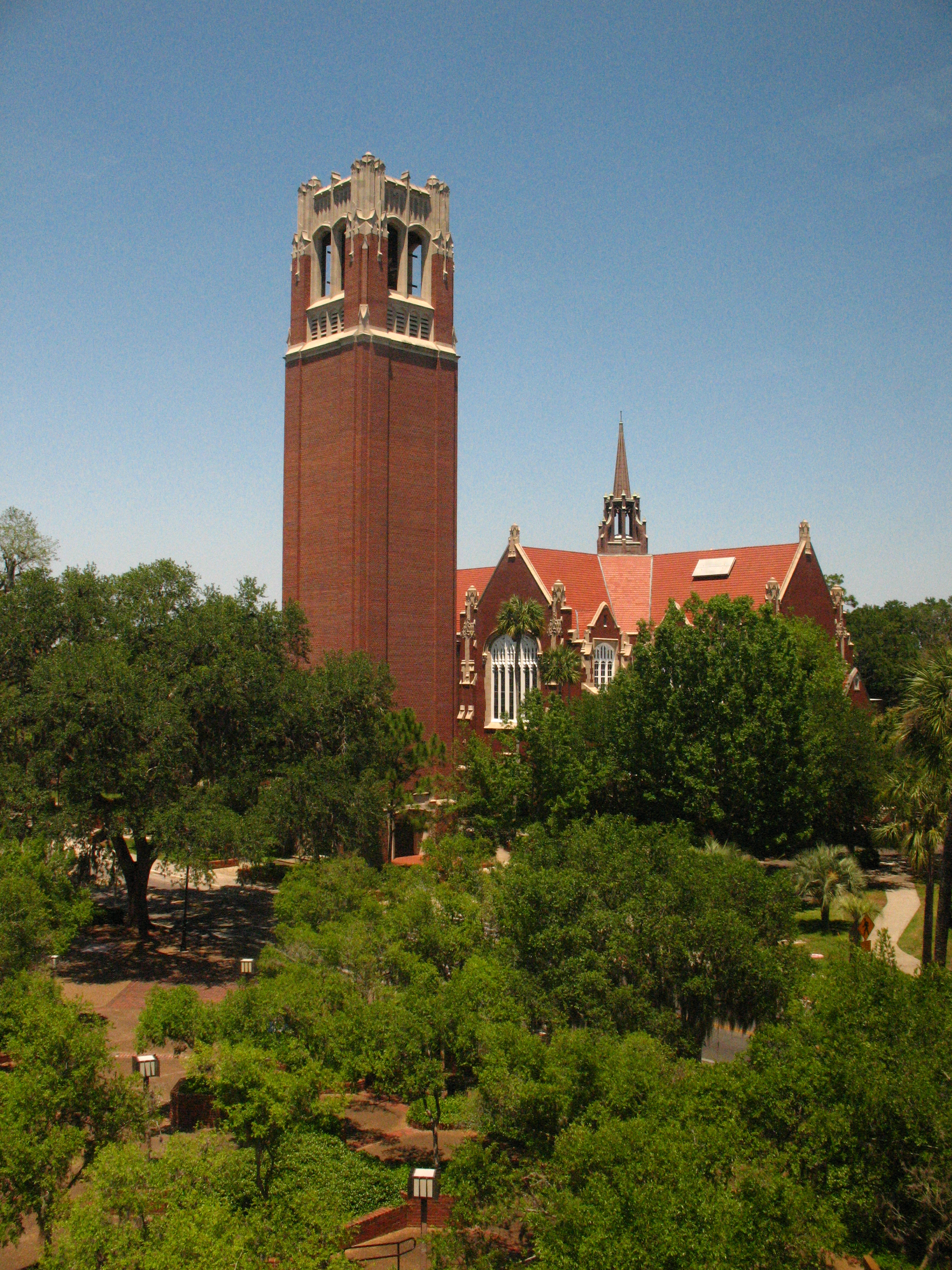
Century Tower at the University of Florida in Gainesville

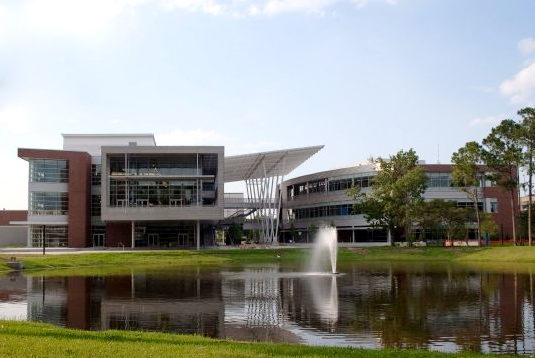
Student Union Building at the University of North Florida in Jacksonville

=== Public institutions ===
State University System

- Florida Agricultural and Mechanical University (Tallahassee)
- Florida State University (Tallahassee)
- University of Florida (Gainesville)
- University of North Florida (Jacksonville)
- University of West Florida (Pensacola)

State College System

- Chipola College (Marianna)
- Florida Gateway College (Lake City)
- Florida State College at Jacksonville (Jacksonville)
- Gulf Coast State College (Panama City)
- North Florida Community College (Madison)
- Northwest Florida State College (Niceville)
- Pensacola State College (Pensacola)
- Santa Fe College (Gainesville)
- St. Johns River State College (Palatka)
- Tallahassee State College (Tallahassee)

=== Private institutions ===
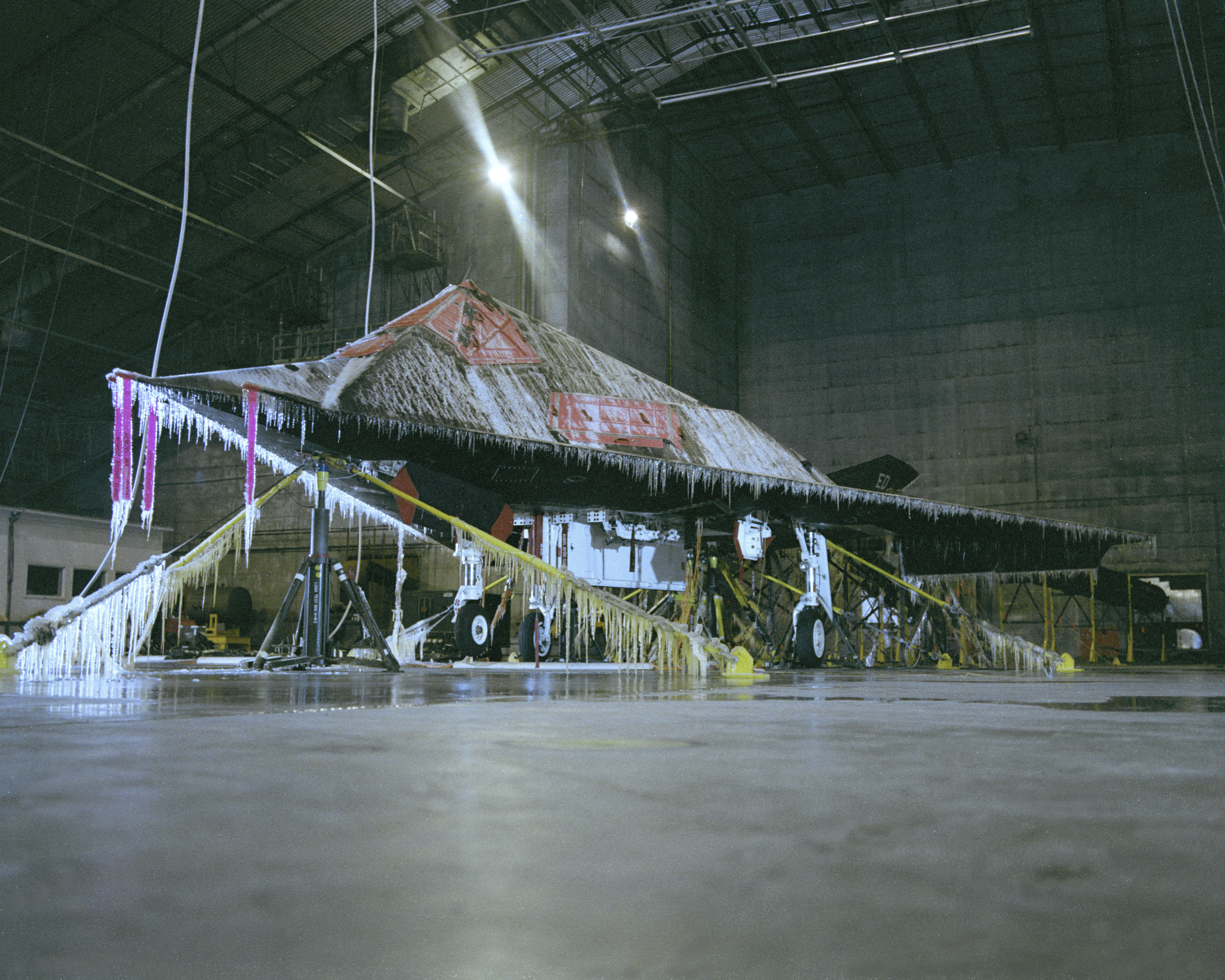
F-117 on ice at McKinley Climatic Laboratory

(Partial list)

- Edward Waters College (Jacksonville)
- Flagler College (St. Augustine)
- Jacksonville University (Jacksonville)
- Jones College (Jacksonville)
- Mayo Clinic College of Medicine and Science (Jacksonville)

=== Research institutions ===
(Partial list)

- Florida Institute for Human and Machine Cognition
- Tall Timbers Research Station and Land Conservancy
- McKinley Climatic Laboratory

== Transportation ==
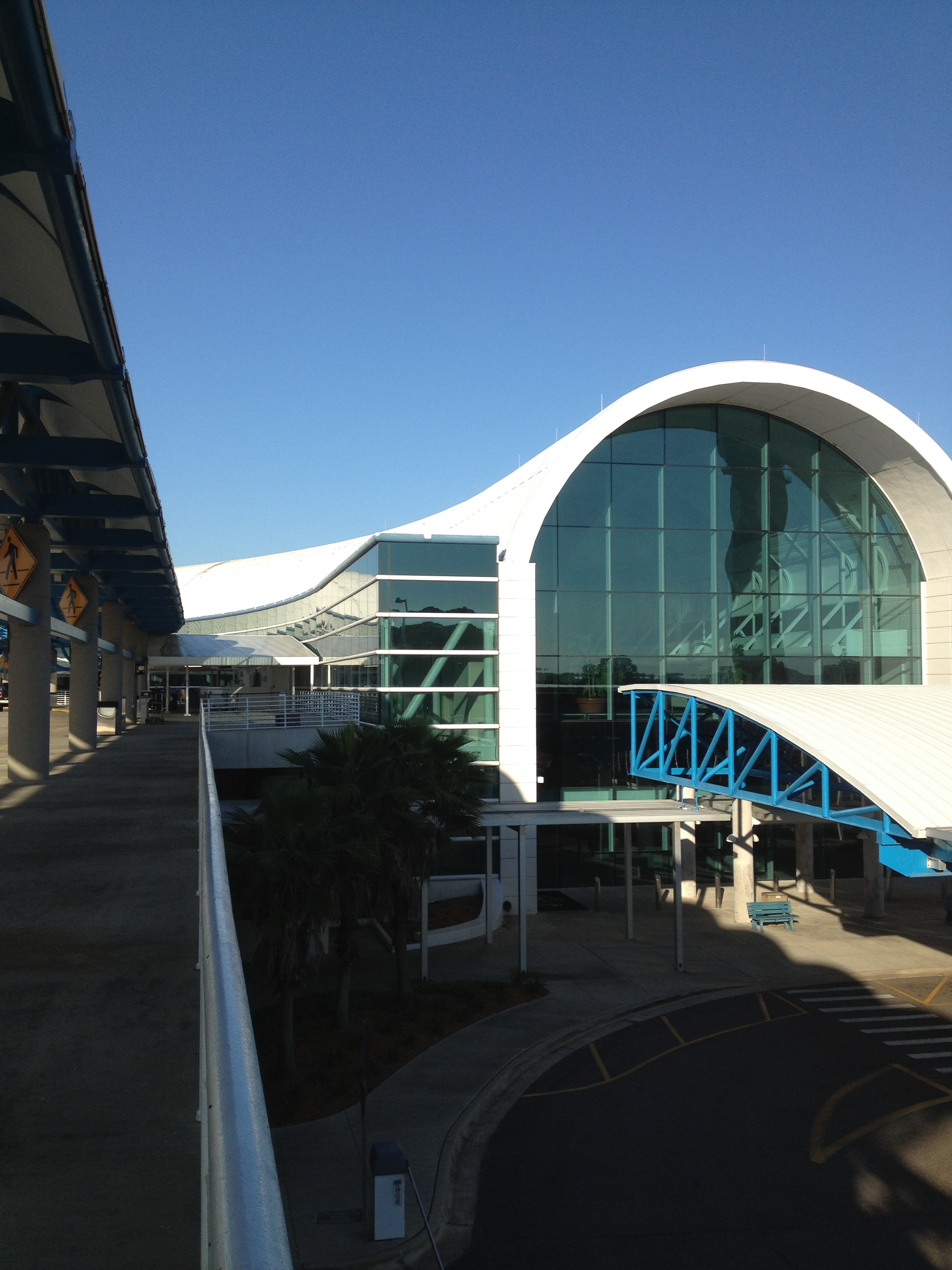
Jacksonville International Airport or JAX is the largest and busiest airport in North Florida

=== Airports ===
The following airports currently have regularly scheduled commercial service:

Airport	ID	City	Category	2016 Enplanements
Jacksonville International Airport	JAX	Jacksonville	Medium Hub	2,729,129
Pensacola International Airport	PNS	Pensacola	Small Hub	792,916
Destin–Fort Walton Beach Airport	VPS	Destin/Fort Walton Beach	Non Hub	440,002
Northwest Florida Beaches International Airport	ECP	Panama City Beach	Non Hub	434,302
Tallahassee International Airport	TLH	Tallahassee	Non Hub	345,404
Gainesville Regional Airport	GNV	Gainesville	Non Hub	207,330
Ocala International Airport	OCF	Ocala	Non Hub	207,300
Northeast Florida Regional Airport	SGJ	St. Augustine	Non Hub	28,462

=== Rail ===
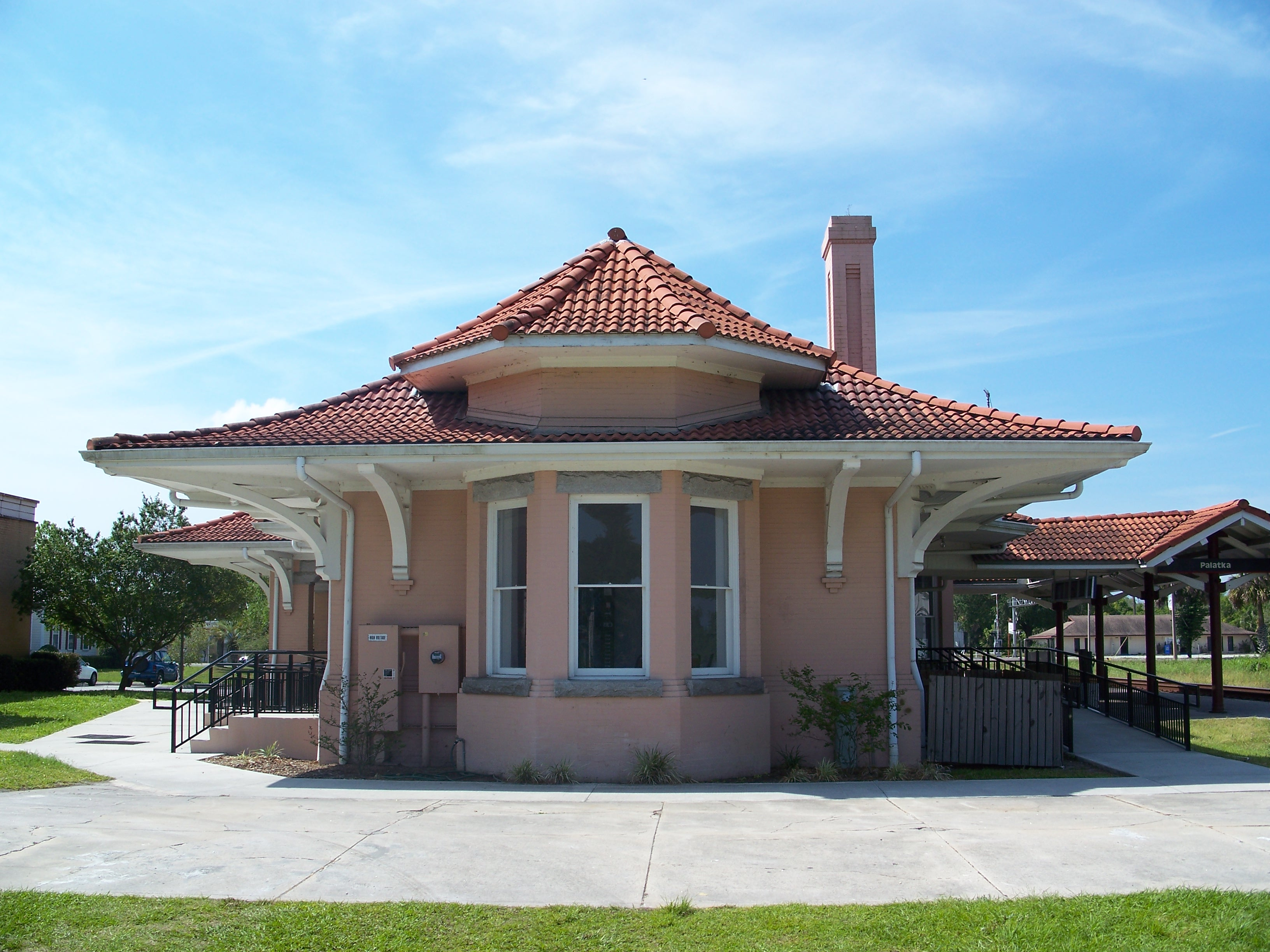
Amtrak station in Palatka

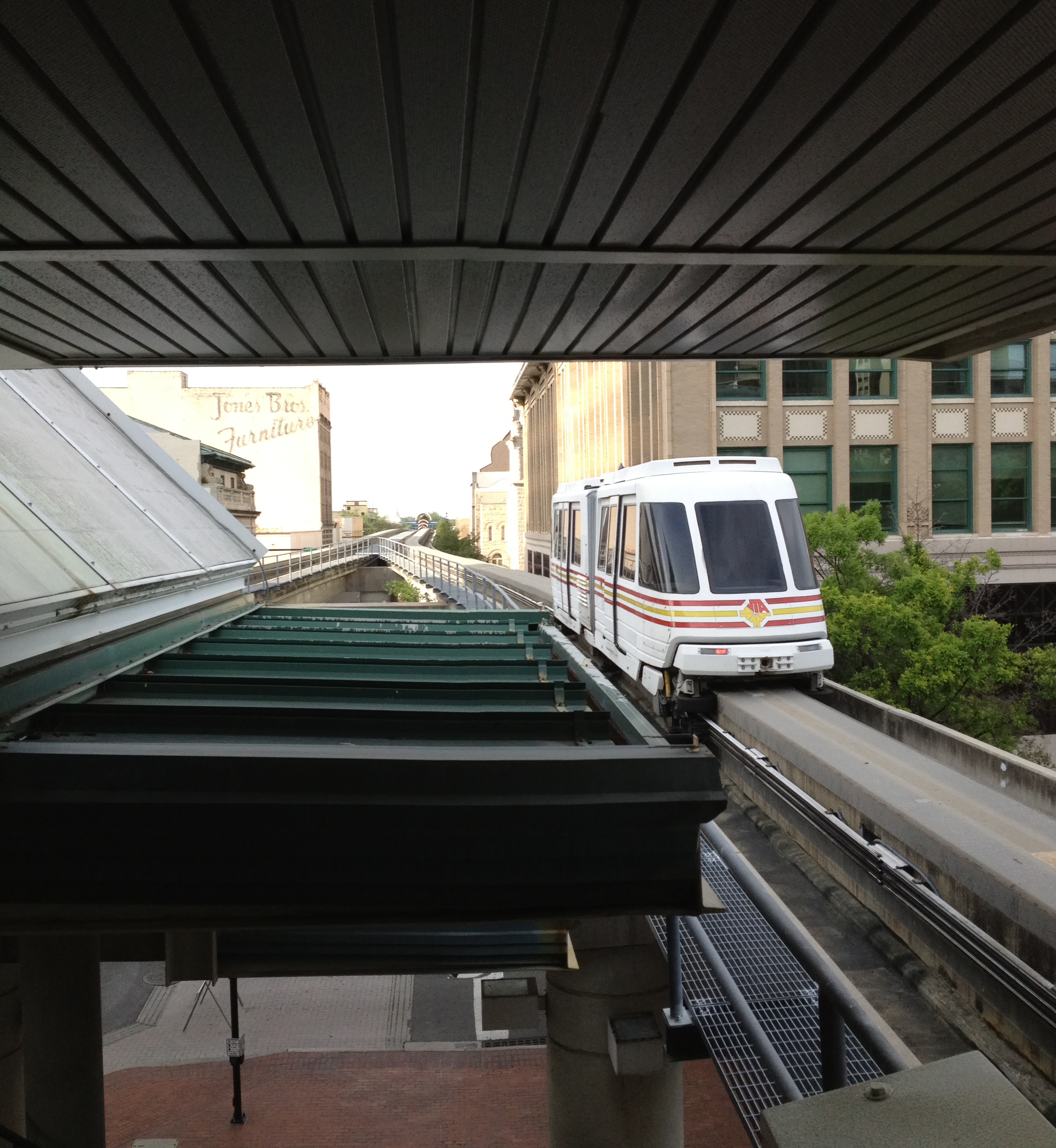
The James Weldon Johnson Park Skyway station in downtown Jacksonville

- Jacksonville Transportation Authority operates a monorail system known as the Skyway
- Amtrak: Jacksonville Station and Palatka Union Depot are currently the only intercity rail stops in North Florida
  - Silver Meteor - Eastern seaboard
  - Silver Star - Eastern seaboard
  - Sunset Limited - East-west route (suspended since 2005)

=== Transit organizations ===
- Escambia County Area Transit
- Gainesville Regional Transit System
- Jacksonville Transportation Authority
- Northeast Florida Regional Transportation Commission
- Okaloosa County Transit
- Ride Solution
- StarMetro

=== Ferries ===
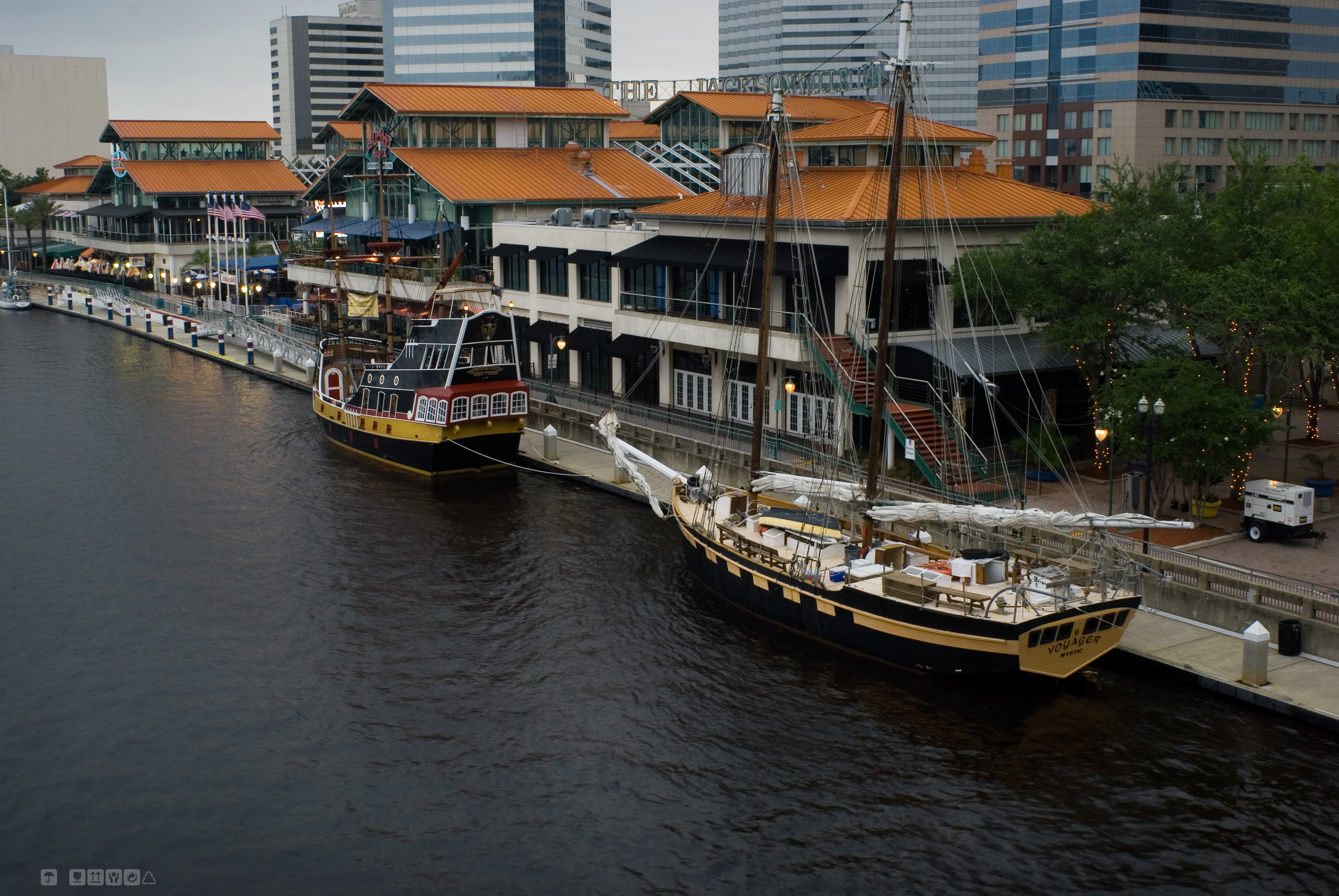
The Jacksonville Landing is one of several stops served by the Jacksonville Water Taxi

- Drayton Island Ferry
- Fort Gates Ferry
- Jacksonville Water Taxi
- Mayport Ferry

=== Roadways ===
Interstates:

- I-10
- I-110
- I-75
- I-95
- I-295 (Jacksonville Beltway)

U.S. Routes:

- US 1
- US 17
- US 19
- US 23
- US 27
- US 29
- US 41
- US 90
- US 98
- US 129
- US 221
- US 231
- US 301
- US 319
- US 331
- US 441
