= Greater Jacksonville Agricultural Fair =

Annual fair and agricultural show in Jacksonville, Florida

Coordinates: 30°19′37″N 81°38′30″W

- Greater Jacksonville Agricultural Fair & Expo
- Formation: 1955
- Founder: Bill Birchfield
- Type: non-profit
- Tax ID no.: 59-0773466
- Legal status: Nonprofit organization
- Purpose: Education
- Headquarters: 510 Fairgrounds Place, Jacksonville, Florida, US
- Region served: northeast Florida
- president/CEO: Bill Olson
- chairman: Tom Stephens
- Board of directors: 13
- Staff: 7 (2024)
- Volunteers: 500 (2024)
- Website: https://www.jacksonvillefair.com/
- Formerly called: Duval County Fair

The Greater Jacksonville Agricultural Fair (GJAF) is an annual 11-day event featuring agricultural shows and educational exhibits, midway rides, concerts, carnival food and games. It is staged at the Jacksonville Fairgrounds in Jacksonville, Florida and has been operated by the non-profit Greater Jacksonville Agricultural Fair Association for seven decades.

== Association ==
The Greater Jacksonville Agricultural Fair Association is a Non-governmental organization, 501(c)3 non-profit educational corporation. It received a state charter in 1957 and is controlled by an unpaid board of directors initially led by Bill Birchfield. More than 500 volunteers plan, staff and manage the fair each year. Their charter says the mission is agricultural education and the population served is Teachers, children and youth.

== History ==
The first GJAF was held in 1955 at the Gator Bowl with 45,000 visitors in attendance. Then, and in the years since, the goal of GJAF has been to "educate, entertain, and inform the citizens of Jacksonville and the surrounding counties about agriculture, horticulture, science, and the arts". In May 1989, ground was broken on property adjacent to the stadium and the following year, the Fair was held at that new location which would remain home for 35 years. That year, over 700,000 people were entertained, more than the population of Jacksonville at the time.

The GJAF is the largest fair/festival in northeast Florida and has an estimated $10 million economic impact. The City of Jacksonville receives nearly $200,000 annually from leases and parking at their surrounding lots during each fair run. Members from area 4-H clubs and Future Farmers of America chapters compete for recognition and rosettes in numerous categories. Since its beginning, the fair has contributed nearly $3.1 million to civic and charitable organizations.

The fair was not held in 2020 due to the COVID-19 pandemic.

== Fair ==
The Midway is typically located midway between the fair entrance and the exhibition buildings/main performance stage. The GJAF utilizes a traveling carnival that includes carnival games, amusement rides and food booths.

=== Entertainment ===
As is typical, carnival games are either games of skill or games of chance, usually offering a small prize for winners. Mechanical rides are available for adults and/or children, such as Ferris wheel, Carousel, House of mirrors, Tilt-A-Whirl, Flying Scooters and Drop tower. Concerts are performed most evenings with at least two national headliners during the 11-day run. Entertainment has featured magic, skateboarding, dog tricks, puppets, racing pigs, alligators, eating contests and a community spotlight stage with local entertainment.

=== Exhibition & judging ===
Culinary Contests have included cakes, pies, honey and cupcakes. Arts and Crafts Contests feature ceramics, fine art & photography, food preservation, general/holiday/needle crafts, weaving & fiber arts. There is a horticulture show & competition, mixed media art competition, STEM challenge, trash art, welding and wood turning competitions. Livestock categories include beef, dairy, poultry and rabbit. There is also a dog and horse show, 4-H and FFA judging contests and barn quilt displays.

Exhibit Building "A" features arts & crafts, commercial exhibitors, culinary entries, the Heritage Square, floral competition, Duval County Public Schools "Book of the Month" quilt judging and booths from 4-H & FFA.

Exhibit Building "B" includes exhibits of Florida crops, plant sales from the Men's Garden Club and horticultural displays.

The Barn and Livestock Arena contains animals & judging, "McDonald's Farm" and displays from the Duval County Cattlemen's Association.

== Fairgrounds ==
=== Existing ===
The fair association had independently owned and operated the downtown land for decades. Their location was landlocked by the Arlington Expressway, football and baseball stadiums, memorial arena and associated parking lots. Parking was very limited, especially when events at nearby facilities were held concurrently. The downtown fairgrounds had always provided parking for events at surrounding facilities including VyStar Ballpark, VyStar Veterans Memorial Arena and EverBank Stadium.

As of February 2025, the fair was still located in downtown Jacksonville. The fenced, 14.1 acres (0.057 km^{2}) property contains Exhibit Hall "A" 27,700 square feet (2,570 m^{2}), Exhibit Hall "B" 14,900 square feet (1,380 m^{2}), Lobby/Restrooms 4,160 square feet (386 m^{2}), Annex 5,188 square feet (482.0 m^{2}), Office 4,870 square feet (452 m^{2}) and Barns plus Arena 50,395 square feet (4,681.8 m^{2})

The Expo center is a 50,000 square feet (4,600 m^{2}) exhibition hall and a 44,000 square feet (4,100 m^{2}) agricultural complex. At trade shows, vendors offer a diverse assortment of products for perusal and sale. Before and after the fair, the facility can be rented for trade shows and other events.

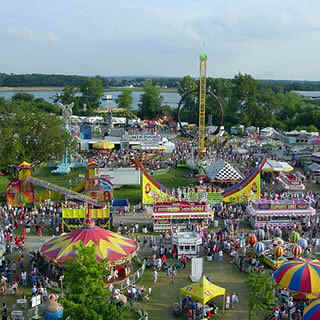
Agricultural fair

=== New ===
The city of Jacksonville issued permits in September 2024 to the fair association for construction of an office, expo hall and amphitheater at a city-owned site in the Cecil Recreation Complex on Jacksonville's westside. The expo hall is 77,500 square feet (7,200 m^{2}) while the total cost was estimated at $17 million. The 82.37 acres (0.3333 km^{2}) parcel at 13611 Normandy Blvd is situated beside the Jacksonville Equestrian Center. The new facilities were projected to be completed during the summer of 2025. After storm damage and construction delays, the new complex will be open in the fall of 2026.

In February 2025 Shad Khan, owner of the Jacksonville Jaguars purchased the 14.1 acres (0.057 km^{2}) fairgrounds for $15.12 million to create 1,600 additional parking spaces. Relocation is targeted for January 2026.
