= Tourist attractions in the United States =

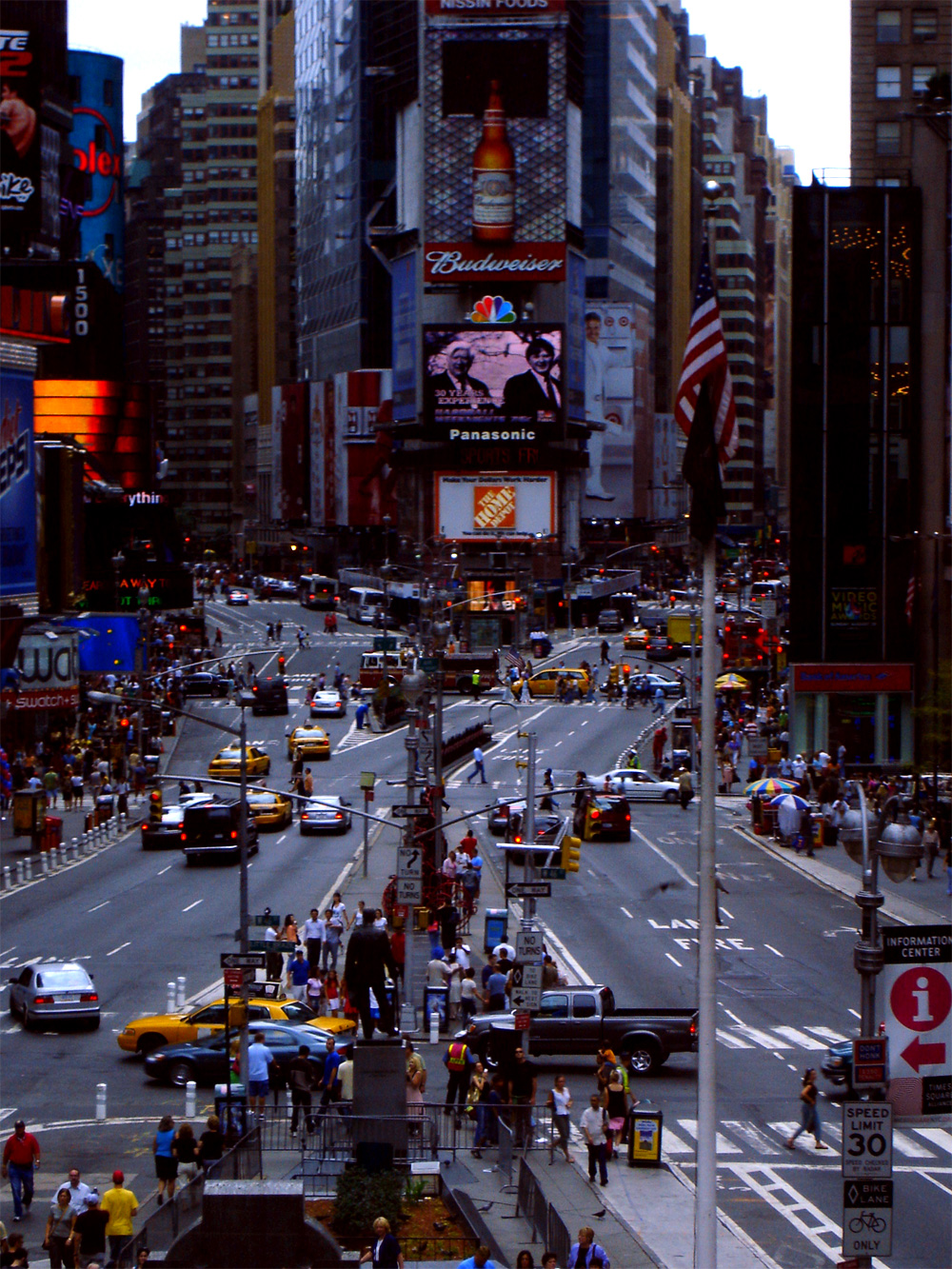
Times Square is the most visited public (not privately owned) tourist site in the United States, with about 50 million visitors annually.

This is a list of the most popular individual tourist attractions in the United States, lists of tourist attractions organized by subject region, and a selection of other notable tourist attractions and destinations.

Times Square is the most visited public (not privately owned) tourist site in the United States, with about 50 million visitors annually.

== Top tourist attractions ==
In 2021, the most visited tourist attractions in the U.S. were:

Tourist attraction	Location	Visitors (millions)
Times Square	New York, New York	50
Central Park	New York, New York	42
Las Vegas Strip	Las Vegas, Nevada	42
Union Station	Washington, D.C.	40
Mall of America	Bloomington, Minnesota	40
National Mall	Washington, D.C.	32
Millennium Park	Chicago, Illinois	25
Golden Gate Park	San Francisco, California	24
Magic Kingdom, Walt Disney World	Orlando, Florida	20.4
Lincoln Park	Chicago, Illinois	20
Disneyland Resort	Anaheim, California	18.76
Faneuil Hall Marketplace	Boston, Massachusetts	18
Balboa Park	San Diego, California	13
Disney's Animal Kingdom, Walt Disney World	Orlando, Florida	13.89
Epcot, Walt Disney World	Orlando, Florida	12.44
Great Smoky Mountains National Park	North Carolina and Tennessee	12.1
Disney's Hollywood Studios, Walt Disney World	Orlando, Florida	11.48
Pier 39, Fisherman's Wharf	San Francisco, California	10
Venice Beach	Los Angeles, California	10
Pike Place Market	Seattle, Washington	10
Golden Gate Bridge	San Francisco Bay Area, California	10
South Street Seaport	New York, New York	9
Mackinac Bridge	Michigan	9
Navy Pier	Chicago, Illinois	9
Grand Canyon	Tusayan, Arizona (nearby)	5

=== Landmarks ===
As of 2007, there are 2,462 registered National Historic Landmarks (NHL) recognized by the United States government. Each major US city has thousands of landmarks. For example, New York City has 23,000 landmarks designated by the Landmarks Preservation Commission. These landmarks include various individual buildings, interiors, historic districts, and scenic sites which help define the culture and character of New York City.

=== Sports ===
Sporting events and their associated venues make up a significant percentage of tourist dollars in the US. Estimates of the US sports industry's size vary from $213 billion to $410 billion. In 1997, 25% of tourism receipts in the United States were related to sports tourism; this would have valued the market at approximately $350 billion annually. Many US sporting events routinely attract international visitors. The 1997 New York City Marathon attracted 12,000 participants from outside the US, out of 28,000 participants.

== Hotels ==
Hotels can be both housing for tourists visiting a particular region or city, and destinations themselves, with many hotels having historic and cultural status.

== Lists of tourist attractions in the United States ==
=== Lists by type of attraction ===
- Art museums
- List of botanical gardens and arboretums in the United States
- Amusement parks
- List of aquaria in the United States
- List of beaches in the United States
- List of casinos in the United States
- List of castles in the United States
- List of festivals in the United States
- Mexican fiestas in the United States
- List of heritage railroads in the United States
- List of museums in the United States
- List of areas in the National Park System:
  - National Battlefield Parks
  - National Historic Parks
  - National Lakeshores
  - National Military Parks
  - National Monuments
  - National Parks
  - National Recreation Areas
  - National Seashores
- List of National Wildlife Refuges of the United States
- List of nature centers in the United States
- List of open-air and living history museums in the United States
- List of Renaissance fairs
- List of shopping malls in the United States
- List of ski areas and resorts in the United States
- List of auto racing tracks in the United States
- List of indoor arenas in the United States
- List of NASCAR tracks
- Seaside resorts
- List of U.S. stadiums by capacity
- Tennis venues
- Reenactment sites
- List of national forests of the United States
- List of U.S. state parks
- List of zoos in the United States
- Wine festivals

=== Lists by city or region ===
- List of attractions and events in Indianapolis
- List of attractions and events in the Louisville metropolitan area
- List of Orlando, Florida attractions
- Attractions in Silicon Valley, California
- List of Wilderness Areas in the Adirondack Park
- List of lands at Disney theme parks
- List of attractions and events in Jacksonville, Florida

=== Other tourist attractions and destinations ===
- Myrtle Beach, South Carolina
- Charleston, South Carolina
- Hilton Head Island, South Carolina
- Atlantic City, New Jersey, and the Boardwalk
- California's Wine Country
- Richmond Strip, Houston, Texas
- New Orleans, Louisiana with the French Quarter
- Hollywood, California
- Outer Banks of North Carolina
- Carolina Beach, North Carolina
- Pennsylvania Dutch Country
- Pocono Mountains, Pennsylvania
- Salem, Massachusetts
- Branson, Missouri
- Wisconsin Dells, Wisconsin
- Door County, Wisconsin § Attractions
- Alamo Mission in San Antonio, Texas
- Hanauma Bay, Hawaii
- Miami, Florida
- Key West, Florida
- Aspen, Colorado
- Soo Locks, Michigan
- Martha's Vineyard
- Cedar Point

== Former tourist attractions ==
- Borscht Belt, New York
- Salton Sea, California
- World Trade Center (1973–2001), New York
- Ford Rotunda, Michigan

== See also ==
- Lists of tourist attractions
