= List of botanical gardens and arboretums in the United States =

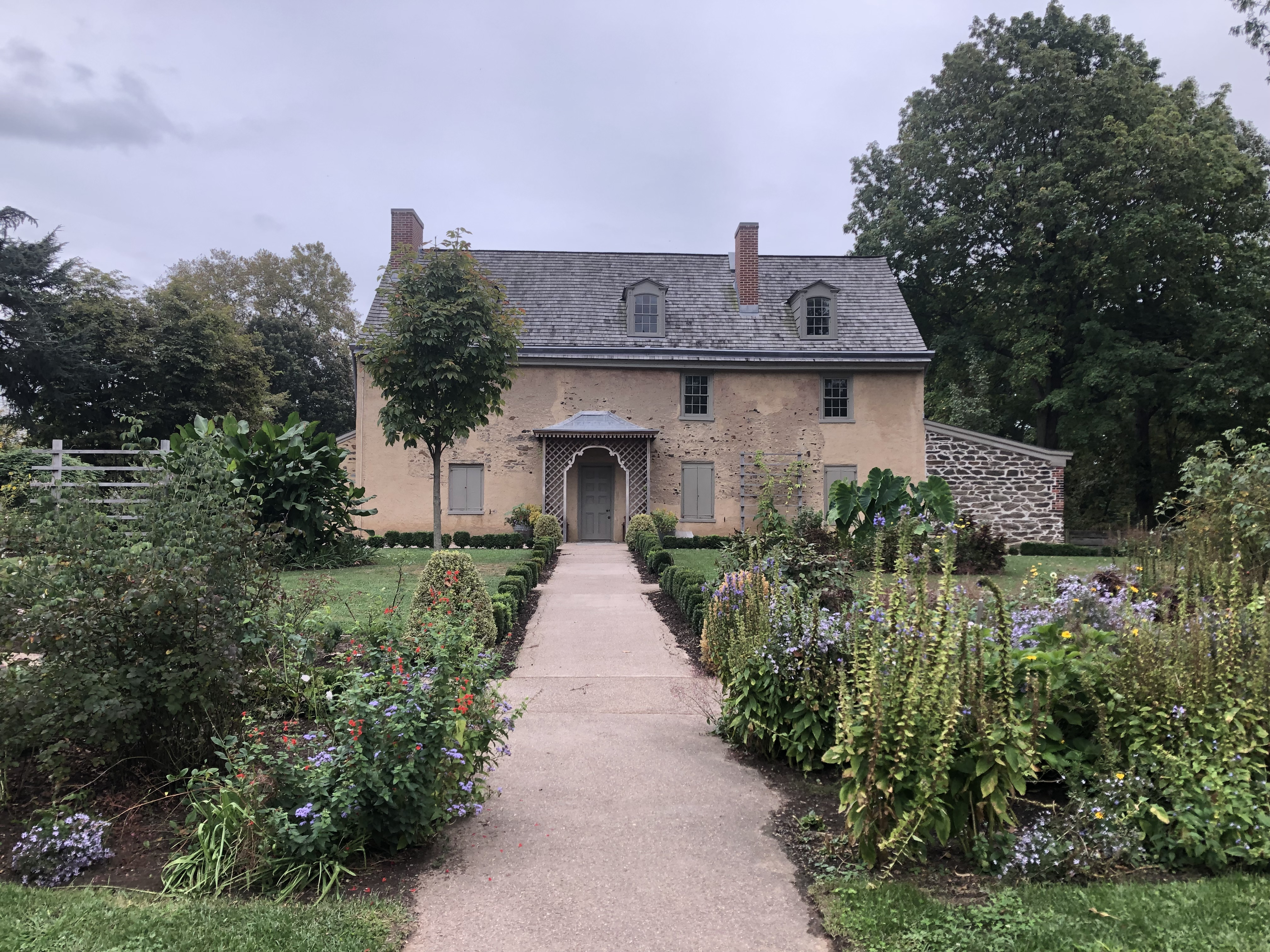
The oldest surviving botanical garden in the United States is Bartram's Garden in Pennsylvania.

This list is intended to include all significant botanical gardens and arboretums in the United States.

The total number of botanical gardens recorded in the United States depends on the criteria used, and is in the range from 296 to 1014.

The number of living plant accessions recorded in these botanical gardens are approximately 600,000.

The approximate number of taxa in these collections is 90,000 taxa or approximately 40,000 species.

The estimated percentage of collections in existence before Convention on Biological Diversity is 70%.

== See also ==
- List of botanical gardens
- Plant Collections Network
- National Register of Champion Trees
- Tourist attractions in the United States
- Lists of tourist attractions
