= Bill Birchfield =

American politician

W.O. Bill Birchfield
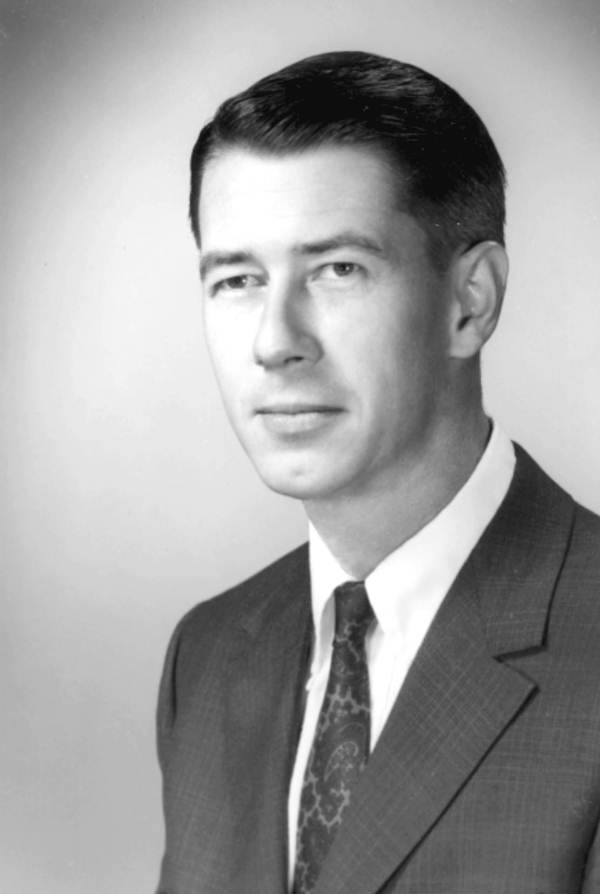

Member of the Florida House of Representatives for the 21st district
- In office 1971–1974

Personal details
- Born: William Otto Birchfield Jr. December 19, 1935 Mayo, Florida, US
- Died: February 5, 2016 (aged 80) Jacksonville, Florida, US
- Party: Democrat
- Spouse(s): Anne Layton, divorced in 1995; Dana Lynn Ferrell 1997 – his death
- Children: 4
- Education: University of Florida
- Occupation: Attorney

William O. Birchfield Jr. (December 19, 1935 – February 5, 2016) was an American politician, lawyer, and civic leader in Jacksonville, Florida. He referred to himself as the "Duke of Mayo" from the small town (population less than 1,000) where he was born and raised.

== Early life and education ==
Birchfield was born in Mayo, Florida, and graduated from Lafayette High School in 1954. He attended the University of Florida, majoring in agriculture, and was a member of Alpha Gamma Rho fraternity, Phi Kappa Phi, and Florida Blue Key. Birchfield was named to the UF Hall of Fame in 1957, earned his bachelor's degree in 1958, then enlisted in the United States Navy. Birchfield decided to further his education and was accepted by the Fredric G. Levin College of Law at the University of Florida, where he was a member of Phi Delta Phi and earned his Juris Doctor in 1963. He was admitted to the Florida Bar on June 12, 1964. He was honored as a Distinguished Alumnus by the University of Florida in 1989.

== Career ==
Birchfield began his law practice in 1964 with Milam, LeMaistre, Ramsay & Martin in Jacksonville and joined the Jacksonville Bar Association. He maintained membership in Jacksonville Area Legal Aid and served on their board of directors. He also belonged to the American Board of Trial Advocates.

An obituary in The Florida Times-Union described him as follows: "W.O. was well known for his sound professional judgment grounded in pragmatic reality. He used a near legendary, finely honed sense of humor with pointedly relevant political witticisms to find solutions to seemingly intractable political and legal problems".

Over his career, he was approved to practice before several Federal Jurisdictions, including the U. S. District Courts for the Middle District of Florida, the Northern District of Florida, and the United States Supreme Court.

In response to the Yates Manifesto, the 1965 Florida Legislature created the Local Government Study Commission. J. J. Daniel was named chairman, and he convinced Birchfield to join the group. Over 15 months they developed a document entitled Blueprint for Improvement, a plan for achieving consolidation of the Jacksonville City and Duval County governments. The plan was placed on a 1967 referendum and approved by Jacksonville voters. On October 1, 1968, the Jacksonville Consolidation was implemented.

== Political career ==
In the late 1960s Birchfield worked with the Duval County legislative delegation and became interested in politics. He successfully campaigned for the Florida House of Representatives as a Democrat representing the 21st district. In his first year, he helped pass a no-fault insurance bill and was assigned to several committees, including the Insurance Committee chairmanship. Among the 34 new legislators in 1971, he was selected "the most promising" and noted for his sarcastic wit. During a particularly pointless debate, he was quoted as saying, "Inasmuch as we have lost sight of our objective, let us redouble our efforts to get there". He was reelected to a second two-year term and served from 1971 to 1974.

After his second term ended, he joined the established Martin & Ade partnership to form Martin, Ade, Birchfield & Johnson in 1974. In 1988 it was renamed Martin, Ade, Birchfield & Mickler. At its height, the firm employed 23 attorneys and was the seventh-ranked law firm in Jacksonville, specializing in corporate law.

== Jacksonville Transportation Authority ==
After leaving politics, Birchfield was appointed to the Jacksonville Transportation Authority Board of Directors.

=== Dames Point Bridge ===
Birchfield was a part of the group that pushed to construct the Dames Point Bridge despite detractors who said the bridge wasn't necessary. Its official name was the Napoleon Bonaparte Broward Bridge, but critics called it the "bridge to nowhere". At the time, the only way to cross the St. Johns River from north Arlington or the beaches was the unpredictable Mayport Ferry or a long, circular route through downtown. Birchfield and the JTA board realized that tremendous growth was happening to the east of the downtown area all the way to the Jacksonville Beaches. At the time of Birchfield's death, the bridge had become an integral part of the Interstate 295 East Beltway.

=== Butler Boulevard ===
In the 1970s, there were only two east-west roads to the beaches, Atlantic Boulevard and Beach Boulevard. Each had traffic signals at every major intersection, creating a long, inefficient commute for beach residents. Birchfield and the JTA board proposed a limited-access expressway named J Turner Butler Boulevard. The position of the new road ran about two miles south of Beach Boulevard, but the route was through mostly undeveloped land. Like the bridge, critics called it "the road to nowhere". Construction began in 1978 from Philips Highway eastward and the first section opened the following year. Development grew as each new interchange opened. The final section, terminating at Florida State Road A1A was not completed until 1997. By then, growth along Butler and at the beach had turned the highway into a major commuter route, requiring a third lane in each direction, plus extended on and off ramps. Birchfield remained on the board for eight years, including time as chairman.

=== Jacksonville Skyway ===
In the early 1970s, Federal grant money was available from the Urban Mass Transit Administration for people mover projects. The Florida Department of Transportation began working with the Jacksonville Transportation Authority to submit an application for Downtown Jacksonville. JTA Chairman Birchfield and the board endorsed the idea, pursued it, and received a $23.5 million grant for the initial construction of the Jacksonville Skyway, a monorail. After leaving the JTA board, Birchfield represented vendor Westinghouse Electric Corp. during contract negotiations with JTA.

== Jacksonville Port Authority ==
After leaving the JTA board, Birchfield was appointed to the Jacksonville Port Authority board of directors for a 4-year term and served as chairman in 1985. That year, he was honored by the Jacksonville Chamber of Commerce with their "Outstanding Political Leader" award. He continued to promote construction of Butler Boulevard, the Dames Point Bridge, and the downtown Skyway.

== Last affiliations ==
Birchfield and several other attorneys left the Martin, Ade, Birchfield & Mickler firm in 2000, joining McGuire, Woods, Battle & Boothe. On January 8, 2001, Martin, Ade, Birchfield & Mickler officially closed. Ten months later, Birchfield joined Lewis, Longman & Walker to concentrate on eminent domain and land-use issues. In 2004, he and Bruce Humphrey formed Birchfield & Humphrey, P.A. Both attorneys were identified as among the best lawyers in their specialty by the rating service "Super Lawyers". Birchfield remained active as a lawyer until shortly before his death.

== Civic involvement ==
Birchfield shared his time and knowledge with numerous civic groups, including the presidency of the Meninak Club, the Greater Jacksonville Agricultural Fair Association, the River Club of Jacksonville, Leadership Jacksonville, the Child Guidance Center of Jacksonville, Public television station WJCT, Jacksonville Legal Aid and the Jacksonville Community Council.

== Personal life ==
Birchfield married the former Anne Layton in 1960 and the couple had four children: Margaret (Meg), Mary Anne, Frank and William III. They divorced on January 17, 1996. On December 11, 1997 he and Dana Lynn Ferrell were married and remained together until his death in 2016.
