= Better Jacksonville Plan =

Growth management plan of Jacksonville, Florida

Better Jacksonville Plan logo

The Better Jacksonville Plan is a growth management plan implemented by the city of Jacksonville, Florida. It was the signature project of Mayor John Delaney. It was approved by Jacksonville voters on September 5, 2000. Lex Hester was a key advisor to Delaney on the $2.25 billion package of projects, pushing for the inclusion of a new downtown library, then serving on the team of top administrators charged with making the far-reaching plan work. The BJP was codified as Section 761 of Jacksonville's Code of Ordinances and administered by the City of Jacksonville, the JEA, and the Jacksonville Transportation Authority, in cooperation with the Florida Department of Transportation. A Sunset provision will terminate the half-penny sales tax used as part of funding the program, to be completed around 2010, no later than 2030.

== Resurfacing ==
The Better Jacksonville Plan financed $105 million to resurface streets in Jacksonville that had not been paved since 1985. The Department of Public Works paved nearly 1,800 miles of streets before it ended in September, 2007. The plan also financed $20 million to fund construction of new neighborhood sidewalks.

== Road projects ==
These include widening, adding curbs and stormwater drainage infrastructure.

- Butler Blvd./US-1 and Butler Blvd./I-95 Intersections
- University/Beach Intersection
- Salt Marsh (Fanning Island and FIND) Mitigation Sites
- Beaver Street (Devoe to Edgewood)
- Atlantic Boulevard (Girvin/Hodges/San Pablo)
- Atlantic/Kernan Intersection
- Atlantic/Southside Intersection

== Railroad grade crossings ==
- New Kings Road (US 1) - South of 45th Street

A six-lane vehicular overpass has been constructed to replace the existing ground-level railroad crossing. This helps alleviate traffic delays caused at this crossing by passing trains.

- Franklin Street - North of 17th Street

A pedestrian overpass has been constructed to bridge three sets of railroad tracks at this location, providing residents safe passage over this busy crossing.

- 7th Street - Between Harrison and Milnor Streets

A pedestrian overpass has been constructed to span the existing single-track railroad crossing, presenting walkers and runners with a continuous route over the track.

== Rapid transit right of way ==
Study alternatives

== Environmental preservation ==
- Environmental Clean-up of Ash Sites - $25 million
- Neighborhood Park Improvements - $15 million
- Preservation Project Jacksonville - $50 million The Preservation Project was a series of land grants for parks. In 2003, The Nature Conservancy awarded Mayor Delaney the President's Conservation Achievement Award for his work on the Preservation Project.
- Septic Tank Remediation - $75 million

== Targeted economic development ==
- Jacksonville Equestrian Center & Cecil Recreation Complex - $25 million
- Jacksonville Zoo: Range of the Jaguar - $10 million
- Northwest Jacksonville Economic Development Fund - $25 million

== New or improved public facilities ==
- VyStar Veterans Memorial Arena - $130 million
- 121 Financial Ballpark - $34 million
- New Main Library - $95 million
- New Library Branches/Renovations - $55 million
- Duval County Courthouse - $190 million (see problems, below)

== Courthouse problems ==
The project cost estimates, on which the program was based, were made in the late 1990s, when the price of building materials was relatively stable. Total costs were initially estimated at $190 million.

In 2003 Mayor John Delaney left office, and was succeeded by John Peyton. Construction had been authorized to commence at the original $190 million amount, but concerns over rising costs caused Peyton to stop work on the courthouse complex on October 28, 2004. At the same time, the mayor's office confirmed a $759 million shortage in Better Jacksonville Plan funding. The office cited rising construction costs as part of the reason for the budget deficit. Afterward all work on the complex ceased for several years. In 2008, the Jacksonville City Council approved work on the facility for a contractor guaranteed cost of $350 million.

Construction actually began in May 2009, with more than 400 workers engaged for over a year. As of June 27, 2010, construction was 37% completed, with the final pour of the concrete roof above the seventh floor. The completion date was established at May 2012, nearly a year later than Mayor Peyton hoped, but the project was within budget.

The city's website stated on February 18, 2011, that interior construction of major systems was on schedule and 55% of the total project was complete, with the exterior work nearly finished. The courthouse opened on June 18, 2012.

== Completion ==
As of late 2014, sales tax revenue was $14 million below what had been projected under plan assumptions, mostly due to the Great Recession. To pay for expenditures, the city borrowed money from other city funds, to be repaid as tax collections rose. Renovation of the old federal courthouse, replaced by the Bryan Simpson United States Courthouse, was expected to begin during 2015 at a cost of $7 million. A special committee was created by the city council to determine the remaining work on the BJP, obligations to other funds, and to project a realistic completion date. Their report was delayed until early 2015 to allow time to evaluate the condition of city bond funds.

== See also ==
- Timeline of Jacksonville, Florida
