= Oldest Wooden School House =

Building in St Augustine, Florida, US

Coordinates: 29.89736°N 81.31355°W

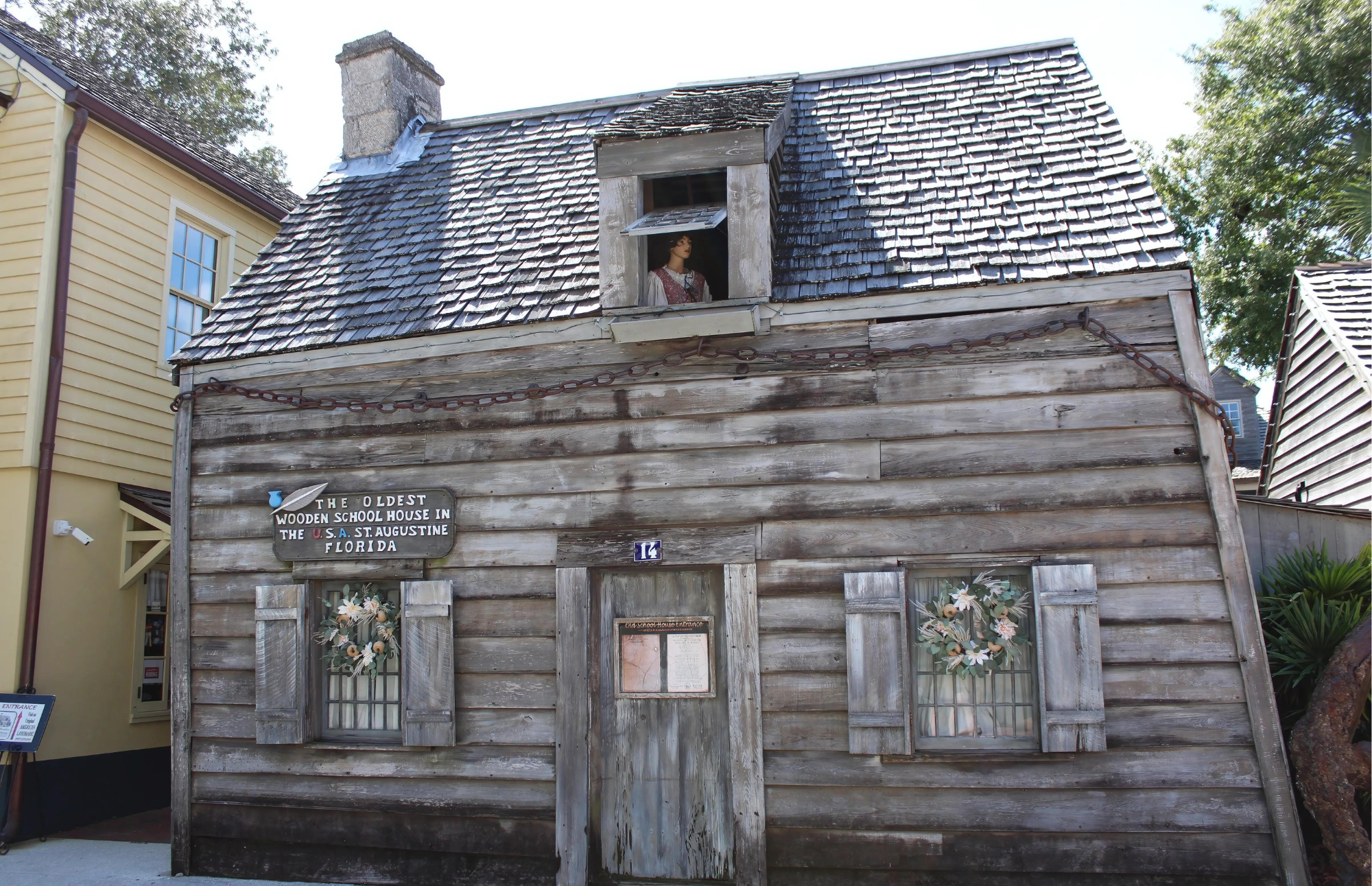
- Oldest Wooden Schoolhouse
- Interactive map of the Oldest Wooden School House area

General information
- Location: 14 St. George Street; St. Augustine, Florida, United States
- Completed: c. 1702; 324 years ago-1716; 310 years ago

The Oldest Wooden School House is a wooden structure located at 14 St. George Street in St. Augustine, Florida near the city gate. It is touted as being the oldest wooden school building in the United States. However, since it was not used as a school until 1788, the actual oldest extant wooden school building in the United states is the Southernmost School in Portsmouth, RI built as a school in 1725 and used until 1865. The exact date of construction of the St. Augustine School is unknown, but it first appears on tax records in 1716. There are no extant wooden buildings in St. Augustine built prior to 1702 when the British burned the city. One other building within the United States also considered by some to be the oldest schoolhouse still standing is the Voorlezer's House built prior to 1696 and located in Historic Richmondtown in Staten Island, New York. However, the dendrochronology recently done places the current building construction in the mid 18th century, c. 1750.

The building is encircled by a large chain, placed there in 1937, to help anchor it to the ground in case of a hurricane. The walls are made of bald cypress and red cedar which are held together by wooden pins and iron spikes, however, recent maintenance has replaced the roofing, among other fixes.

The schoolmaster and family lived on the second floor above the classroom and the kitchen was located in a separate building to reduce heat and threat of fire. The building originally belonged to Juan Genoply. The classroom was one of the first in the US to be co-ed, educating both boys and girls since 1788.

== Tours ==
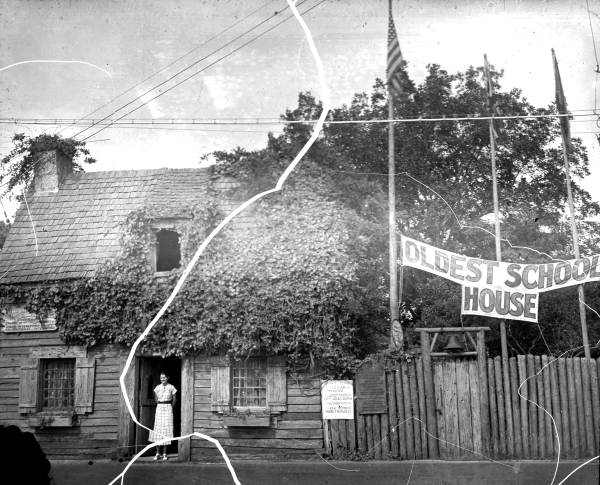
Glass negative image of schoolhouse circa 1930s.

The school is open to tourists every day except Christmas, with extended summer hours. The facility features a self-guided tour with an animatronic teacher and student (made by Sally Corp.) giving a brief history of the house. There are also numerous items and informational signs posted around the building. Gardens located behind the house feature exhibits on the kitchen, a rebuilt outhouse, an old well, and a sculpture garden displaying busts of famous educators. The statuary was part of a project known as The Grove of Educators which sought to gather statues of educators from every country in the Americas, though only a few countries participated.

== References and footnotes ==
=== References ===
- Florida, DK Eyewitness Travel Guides, 2004, pg. 198
