= Patriot Transportation =

American trucking and real estate company

Patriot Transportation Holding, Inc.
- Type: Subsidiary
- Traded as: Nasdaq: PATI; Russell Microcap Index component
- Industry: Transportation
- Founded: Jacksonville, United States (1988) spin-off of Florida Rock Industries
- Headquarters: Jacksonville, Florida, U.S.
- Key people: John D. Baker II (Chairman); Thompson S. Baker II (CEO)
- Products: Trucking; Real estate
- Revenue: ▲US$ 139.774 million (FY 2013)
- Operating income: ▲US$ 20.434 million (FY 2013)
- Net income: ▲US$ 15.385 million (FY 2013)
- Total assets: ▲US$ 287.093 million (FY 2013)
- Total equity: ▲US$ 192.646 million (FY 2013)
- Number of employees: 886 (September 2013)
- Parent: United Petroleum Transports (2023–present)
- Subsidiaries: Florida Rock & Tank Lines, Inc.
- Website: Patriottrans.com

Patriot Transportation is an American trucking and real estate holding company based in Jacksonville, Florida. Through its affiliates, Patriot specializes in moving freight consisting mainly of petroleum products and other liquids and also dry bulk commodities.

As of September 30, 2013, Patriot Transportation had approximately $287.1 million in total assets. FRP Development Corp, the companies real estate division, acquires, constructs, leases and manages land and commercial buildings.

On December 21, 2023, United Petroleum Transports acquired the company for approximately 66.2 million dollars.

== See also ==
- Florida Rock Industries
- Vulcan Materials
