= Napoleon Bonaparte Broward House =

- U.S. National Register of Historic Places
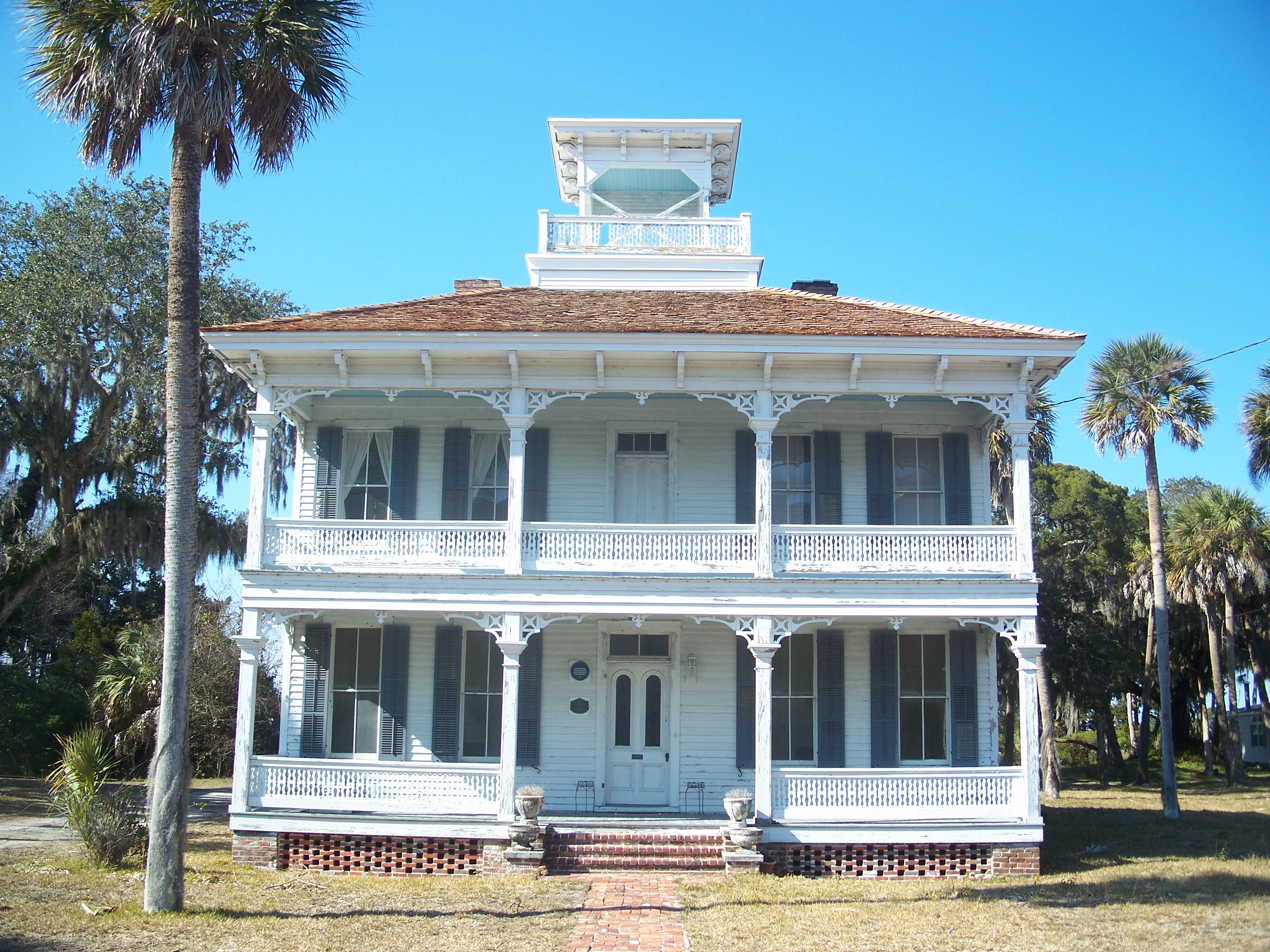

- Location within Florida Location within the United States
- Location: Jacksonville, Florida, USA
- Coordinates: 30°24′9″N 81°25′58″W
- Area: less than one acre
- NRHP reference No.: 72000308
- Added to NRHP: December 27, 1972

The Napoleon Bonaparte Broward House is a historic home in Jacksonville, Florida. It is located at 9953 Hecksher Drive, and was the residence of Florida governor Napoleon B. Broward. On December 27, 1972, it was added to the U.S. National Register of Historic Places.
