= Potter's Wax Museum =

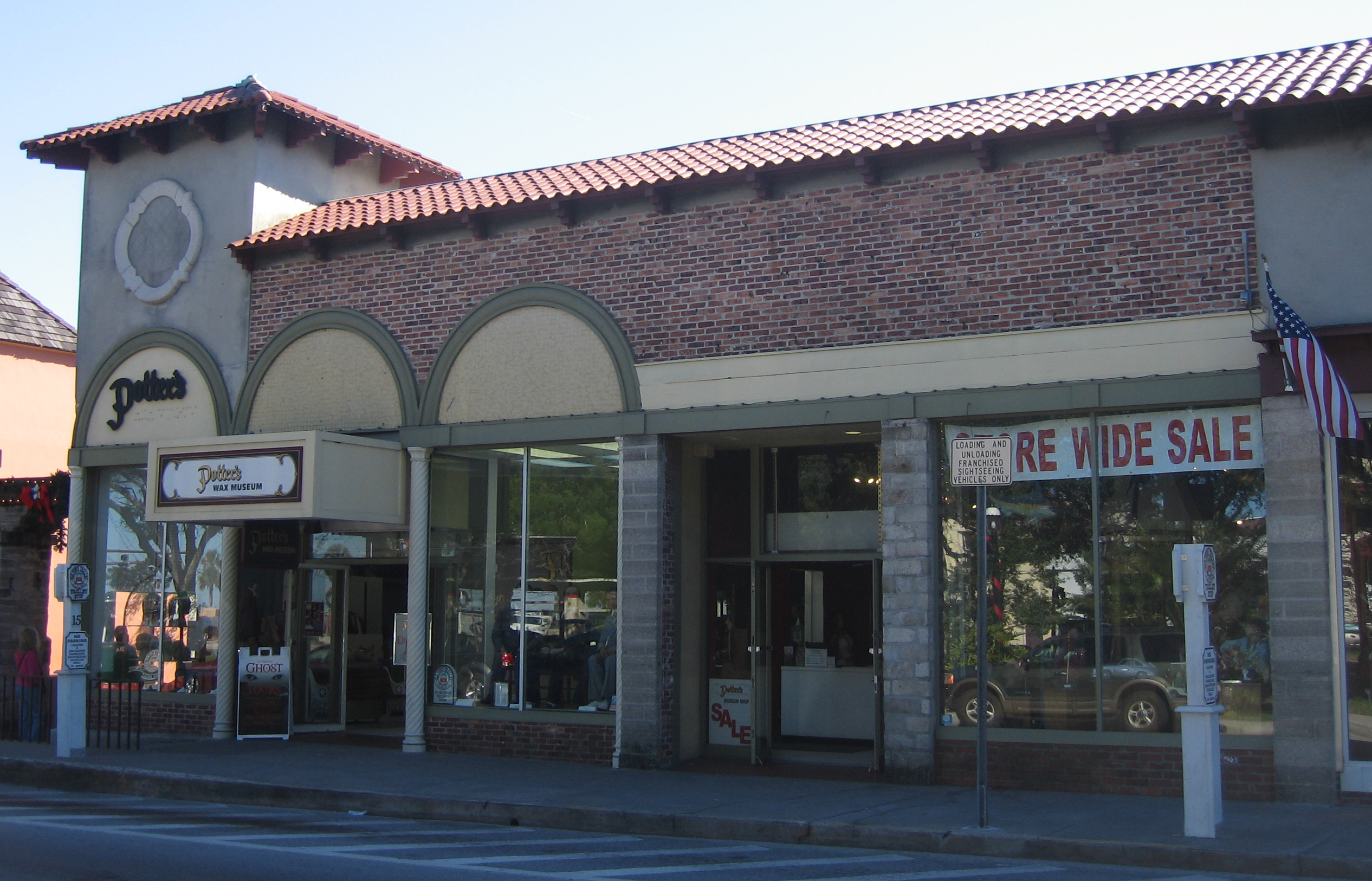
- The second location of the museum at 17 King Street in December 2008.

- Location within Florida
- Established: 1948
- Location: 31 Orange Street (1 King Street from 1948 to 1986, 17 King Street from 1986 to 2013); St. Augustine, Florida; United States
- Coordinates: 29.89224°N 81.31192°W
- Type: Wax
- Website: Potter’s Wax Museum

The Potter's Wax Museum is located at 31 Orange Street (formerly 1 King Street from 1948 to 1986, 17 King Street from 1987 to 2013), St. Augustine, Florida, United States. It houses over 160 wax sculptures (243 before 1986) covering a wide range of real and fictitious figures, including famous politicians, entertainers, horror characters, historical personalities, sports stars and other celebrities. George L. Potter established the collection in 1948 and the attraction is the first wax museum in the United States.

== History ==
As a child George Potter traveled the world with his family. One family trip to London where Potter visited Madame Tussaud's Wax Museum. In his adulthood he made a small fortune in real estate and the rental market which afforded Potter to live out his dream of bringing wax work to America. After studying the market in St. Augustine a location at the corner of King Street and A1A (San Marcos Ave) was chosen. Gems London Wax Studio was contracted for the construction of the initial collection.

For many years the museum was operated under the moniker "Potter's International Hall of Fame." Guided tours gave accounts of the lives of the persons represented by the wax figures.

Upon the death of Potter in 1979, the museum was maintained by family until 1986. His family, not sharing his passion for wax works disassembled and sold off much of the museum and its collection. The former curator Dottie White purchased the core collection of about 150 figures and re-opened the museum at its King Street location in 1987. Over the next two decades the museum underwent several make overs and renovations.
