= George Crady Bridge Fishing Pier State Park =

State park in Florida, United States

- IUCN category V (protected landscape/seascape)
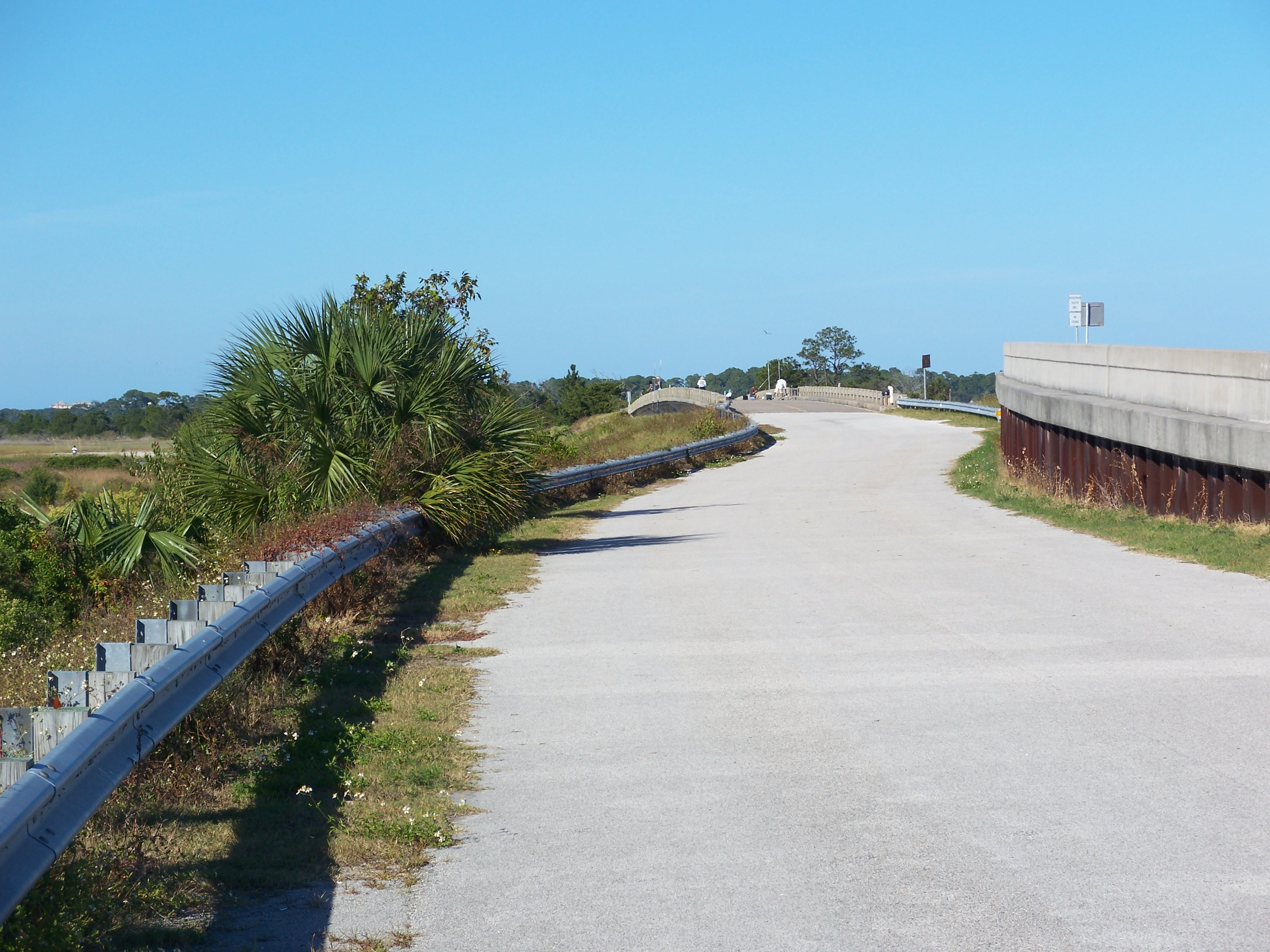
- George Crady Bridge

- Location within Florida Location within the United States
- Interactive map of George Crady Bridge Fishing Pier State Park
- Location: Duval and Nassau counties, USA
- Nearest city: Jacksonville, Florida
- Coordinates: 30°31′8″N 81°27′4″W
- Governing body: Florida Department of Environmental Protection

The George Crady Bridge Fishing Pier State Park is a Florida State Park, located on the Duval/Nassau county border of Amelia Island State Park, off A1A. The park is named for George Crady, a local Florida state representative and supporter of the Florida State Park system.

== Admission and Hours ==
There is a $2.00 per person entrance fee. Florida state parks are open between 8 a.m. and sundown every day of the year (including holidays).
