= Caribiana Sea Skiffs =

Cabriana Sea Skiffs
- Industry: Sea Skiffs
- Predecessor: Lynn Rabren
- Founded: 1996
- Founder: Lynn Rabren
- Successor: Caribiana Boat Manufacturing Company Inc.
- Headquarters: Foley, Alabama, USA
- Products: Maracas 23
- Website: www.caribiana.com

Cabriana Sea Skiffs is a boutique maker of custom sea skiffs built out of fiberglass and teak. It is located in Foley, Alabama.

== History ==
The company was founded in 1996 by Lynn Rabren. The "boutique Gulf Coast boatbuilder" was relaunched under new ownership in 2019. Caribiana sea skiffs are outfitted to each customers wishes with mahogany or teak wood finishes. Having been described as having “graceful” hull shaping and “classic” wood detailing, the ease and maneuvering of this lightweight boat with a shallow draft make it popular with boaters because it can go where similarly sized boats cannot.

== Production ==
Caribiana's sea skiffs are produced in small quantities (about 20 boats a year in 2019 and only about 110 are in existence). As of 2023, Caribiana is back in full production under new ownership. Production has started on the Maracas 23 model which pays tribute to the island nation this boat originated from in Trinidad's North Coast. This stunning, handcrafted boat is built with artistry and precision in mind. The Maracas embodies a beautiful balance of style, craftmanship and modern functionality to make it an artisan skiff that is simply timeless. This boat and design has a fascinating local history and won a Garden & Gun magazine award for best of Made in the South in 2010.
