= Cecil Recreation Complex =

Facility in Jacksonville, Florida

- Location within Florida
- Interactive map of Cecil Recreation Complex
- Location: 13611 Normandy Blvd, Jacksonville, Florida, U.S.
- Coordinates: 30.240198°N 81.906681°W
- Area: 832 acres (3.37 km^{2})
- Established: 2004
- Operator: Jacksonville Department of Parks, Recreation and Community Services
- Open: Year round
- Website: Cecil Recreation Complex

The Cecil Recreation Complex at the Cecil Commerce Center is a comprehensive recreational facility on the west side of Jacksonville, Florida. The $25 million project was part of the 2000 Better Jacksonville Plan and will eventually include 1,500 acres (6.1 km^{2}). The City of Jacksonville, Parks and Recreation department manages the facilities.

== History ==
Prior to 1999, Naval Air Station Cecil Field included nearly 23,000 acres (93 km^{2}). During that era, the city of Jacksonville created the Cecil Field Park, which is now part of the Cecil Recreation Complex.

== Facilities ==
=== Cecil Field Park ===
A new (post Y2K) gymnasium and fitness center are located there. Amenities that remain from the Navy days include: an 18-hole golf course (closed in 2024), two lighted baseball fields, an outdoor basketball court, a football field, two pedestrian docks for fishing at Lake Newman, numerous picnic tables, grills, and playground equipment; restrooms, two adult softball fields, a youth softball field and six lighted tennis courts.

=== Equestrian Center ===
The Jacksonville Equestrian Center is the jewel of the Cecil Recreation Complex. The 125,000-square-foot (11,600 m^{2}) multi-purpose center was opened in March 2004 and its 4,000 seats have hosted a diverse group of events which range from Dressage to Rodeo; the Royal Lipizzan Stallions to the 4-H annual horse show. Non-equestrian events have included Monster truck shows, Demolition derby, music concerts and band camp.

=== Community Center ===
The center has programs for children, teens, senior citizens and home schooling. Computer literacy programs are available for everyone. Community organizations can utilize the facilities for their meetings, and private groups can rent it for special events.

=== Aquatics Center ===
The facility, built for $5.7 million in 2004, has an olympic-sized pool and a family/exercise pool The heated indoor pools can be used year-round, but in the summer, large glass panels are opened for air circulation. The facility has hosted scores of high school swim meets since 2004. In addition to open swimming, lessons are available for children and adults. Infants and toddlers have their own programs, water babies and water tots, respectively. Water aerobics classes are utilized by many senior citizens and a youth swim team is sponsored during the summer.

=== Softball diamonds ===
The Cecil Fastpitch Softball Complex includes four lighted fields, with usage limited to girls fastpitch softball teams and girls tee-ball. Lake Fretwell Adult Softball features two fields and two pavilions.

=== Gymnasium ===
Activities in the gym itself are open basketball and volleyball; racquetball courts are also utilized. The fitness center includes free weights and Nautilus exercise equipment for individual use. Programs include Cardiovascular workouts, senior aerobics and personal training. Saunas are located in both locker rooms.
