= VyStar Ballpark =

Baseball park in Jacksonville, Florida

Coordinates: 30.324968°N 81.643069°W

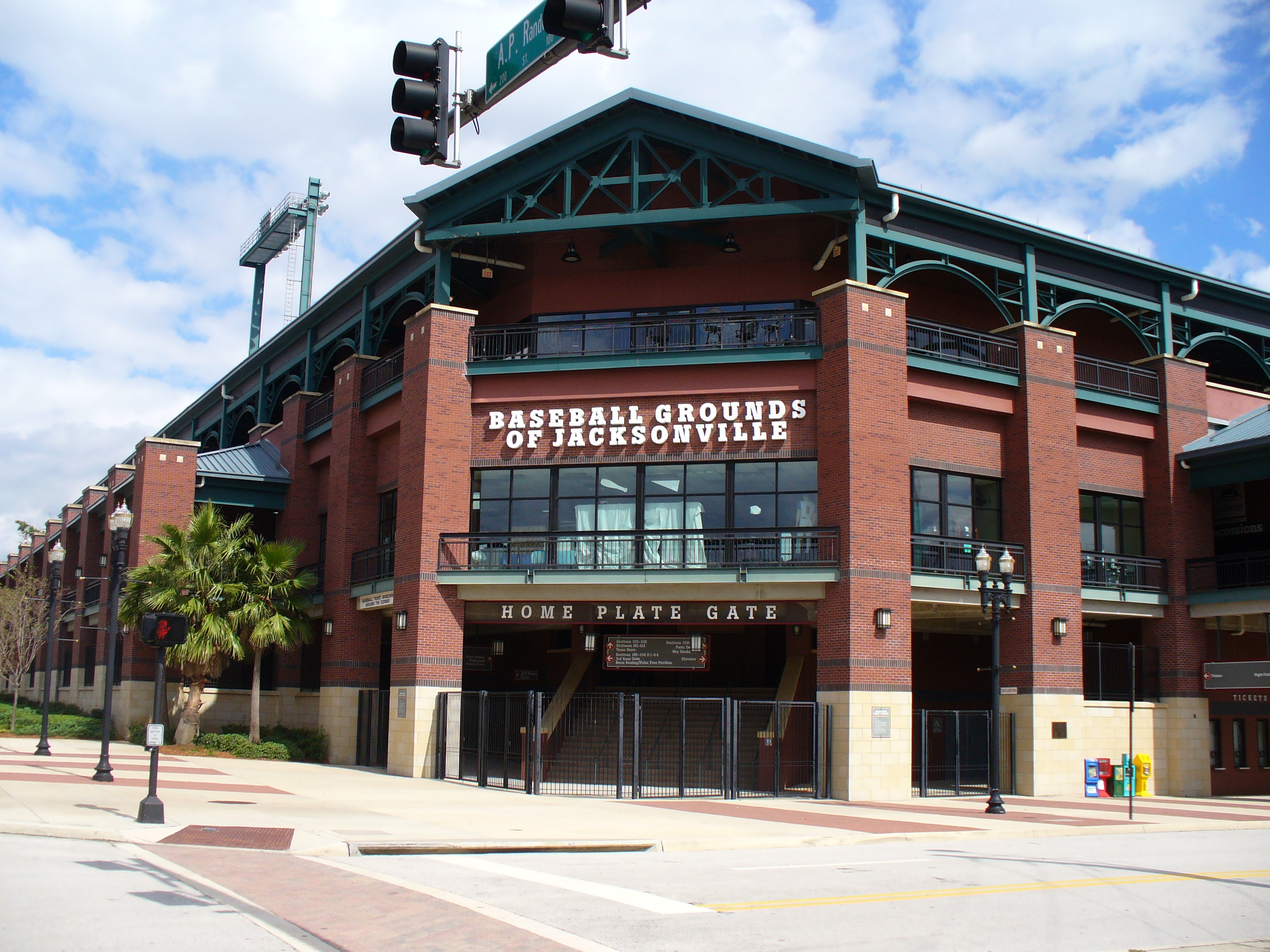
- Exterior of venue under former signage (c.2008)

- Location within Florida Location within the United States
- Interactive map of VyStar Ballpark
- Former names: Jacksonville Baseball Park (planning/construction); Baseball Grounds of Jacksonville (2003–14, 2017–19); Community First Park (2015–16); 121 Financial Ballpark (2020-25)
- Address: 301 A. Philip Randolph Blvd; Jacksonville, Florida
- Owner: City of Jacksonville
- Operator: ASM Global
- Capacity: 11,000
- Surface: Grass
- Field size: Left field: 321 ft (98 m); Center field: 420 ft (130 m); Right field: 317 ft (97 m)

Construction
- Groundbreaking: December 11, 2001
- Opened: April 11, 2003
- Cost: $34 million ($59.5 million in 2025 dollars)
- Architect: Populous
- Project managers: Gilbane, Inc.; Scheer Partners; Renaissance Global Services
- Structural engineers: Bliss & Nyitray, Inc.
- Services engineers: John J. Christie & Associates, PC
- General contractor: Barton Malow

Tenants
- Jacksonville Jumbo Shrimp (SL/IL) (2003–present); Jacksonville Armada FC (NASL) (2015–16)

Website
- Venue Website

VyStar Ballpark (originally known as the Baseball Grounds of Jacksonville) is a baseball park in Jacksonville, Florida. It is the home stadium of the Jacksonville Jumbo Shrimp; a Minor League Baseball team, who play in the International League. The facility opened in April 2003.

== History ==
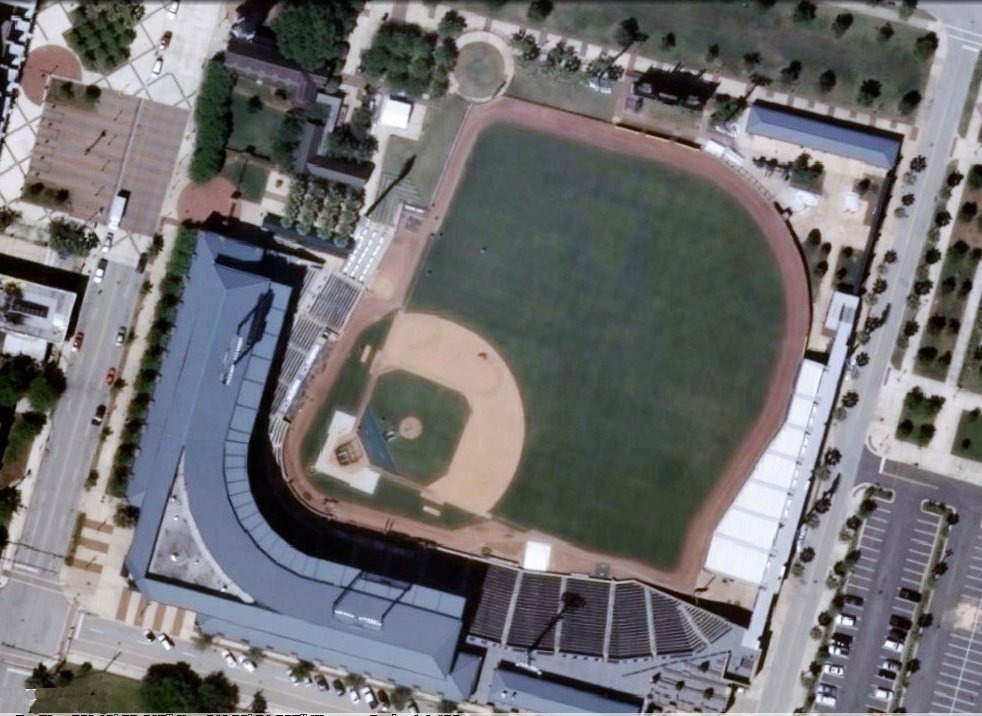
An aerial view of the park

The baseball grounds were proposed as part of the city planning program known as the Better Jacksonville Plan. It was designed to replace the aging Wolfson Park, the previous home of the Double-A Southern League's Jacksonville Suns. The facility cost $34 million and broke ground in 2002, with construction being completed the following year. It became the first completed project of the Better Jacksonville Plan.

The Atlantic Coast Conference baseball championship was held at the venue from 2005 to 2008. The Georgia Tech Yellow Jackets won the first ACC Tournament at the ballpark, followed by the Clemson Tigers in 2006, the North Carolina Tar Heels in 2007, and the Miami Hurricanes in 2008.

The Baseball Grounds hosts an annual game between the Florida Gators and the Florida State Seminoles. The most recent game was on March 24, 2026, when Florida defeated Florida State 5–0 in front of 6,776 fans.

The ballpark has twice hosted the Southern League All-Star Game. On July 8, 2003, the league's West Division All-Stars defeated the East Division All-Stars, 7–5, before 7,552 spectators. On July 17, 2013, the South Division defeated the North Division, 6–0, in front of a crowd of 9,373.

The Jacksonville Jumbo Shrimp became the Triple-A affiliate of the Miami Marlins in 2021 and shifted from the Southern League to the Triple-A East.

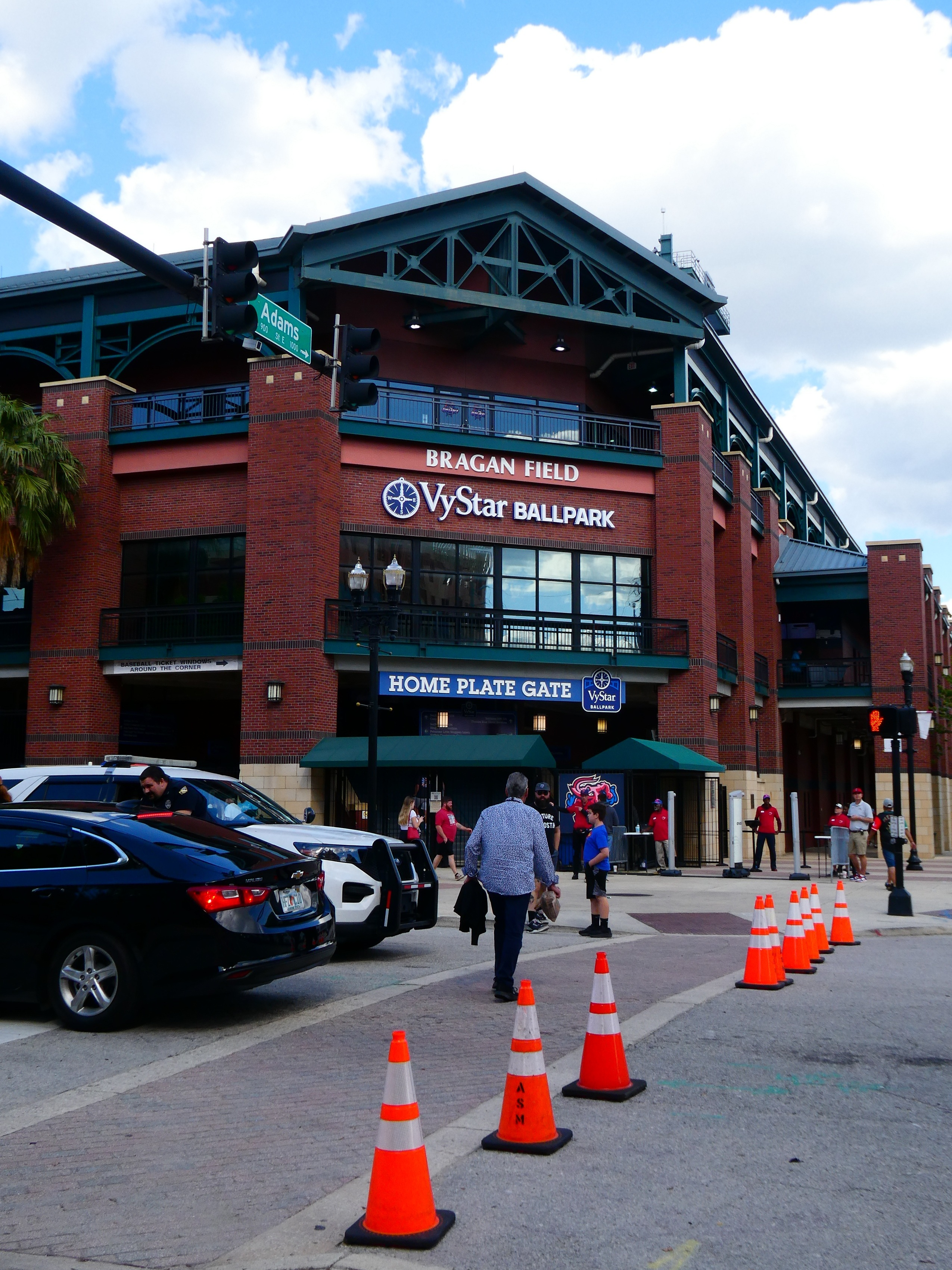
Home Plate entrance in 2025

The facility has nearly 6,000 stadium-style chairs and can accommodate more than 11,000 fans, with an old-fashioned design, brick facade and a grass seating berm and bleacher seating. It also features 12 luxury skyboxes, four skydecks, a large scoreboard and videoboard, a playground, and the "knuckle," a unique 9-foot-high (2.7 m) mound for seating at the left field corner. Other ballpark features include a souvenir shop, first aid facility, various seating levels and perspectives, an ample number of restrooms and concession areas, in-seat concession services behind home plate, wide concourse and seating aisles and a high-definition video scoreboard in left center field.

The park has an in-house video broadcast of games provided by The Schelldorf Television Network. The ballpark is located in downtown Jacksonville, situated between VyStar Veterans Memorial Arena and EverBank Stadium.

Following VyStar Credit Union's merger with 121 Financial, the name was changed to VyStar Ballpark. Along with the new name, the stadium will be getting a US$31.8M upgrade, which is scheduled to be completed for the Jumbo Shrimp's 2025 home opener.

== Attendance records ==
The largest crowd for a baseball game at the ballpark was 12,943, which occurred on April 11, 2003, during the grand opening of the park in a game between the Jacksonville Suns and the Huntsville Stars.

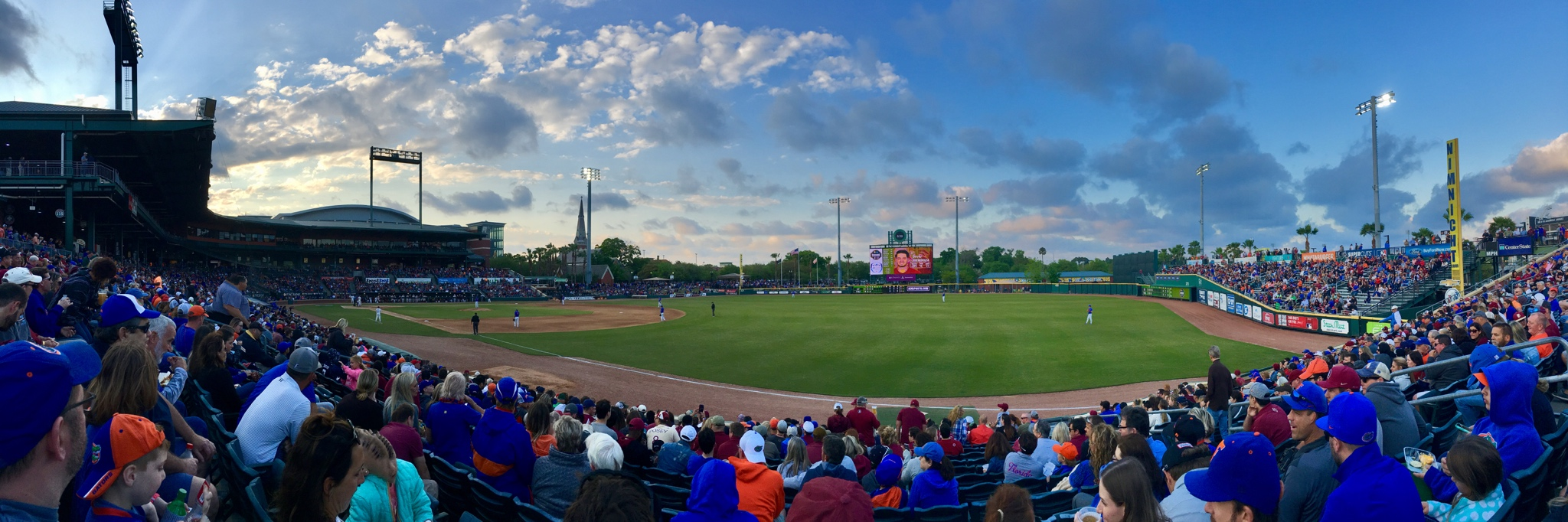
A crowd of over 8,000 in attendance to watch the Florida Gators face the Florida State Seminoles
