= Jacksonville Equestrian Center =

Equestrian facility in Jacksonville, Florida

Coordinates: 30.241162°N 81.907625°W

The Jacksonville Equestrian Center is an equestrian facility at the Cecil Commerce Center in Jacksonville, Florida. It consists of an indoor multi-purpose arena, officially named Championship Arena (capacity at 4,000), two outdoor competition arenas, two outdoor warm-up arenas, a turf arena, 426 permanent stalls, and 70 Full Service RV spaces. The facility has a grand opening in March, 2004; it is home to several horse-related events. In 2007 it was projected to be the home of the Jacksonville Pelicans of the National Indoor Football League.

The center is part of the Cecil Recreation Complex, the most comprehensive recreational facility on Jacksonville's Westside. The $25 million project was part of the 2000 Better Jacksonville Plan. The City of Jacksonville, Parks and Recreation department manages the facilities. They have hosted a diverse group of events which range from dressage to Rodeo; the Royal Lipizzan Stallions to the 4-H annual horse show. Non-equestrian events have included Monster truck shows, Demolition derby, music concerts and band camp.
