= Amelia Island State Park =

State park in Florida, United States

- IUCN category IV (habitat/species management area)
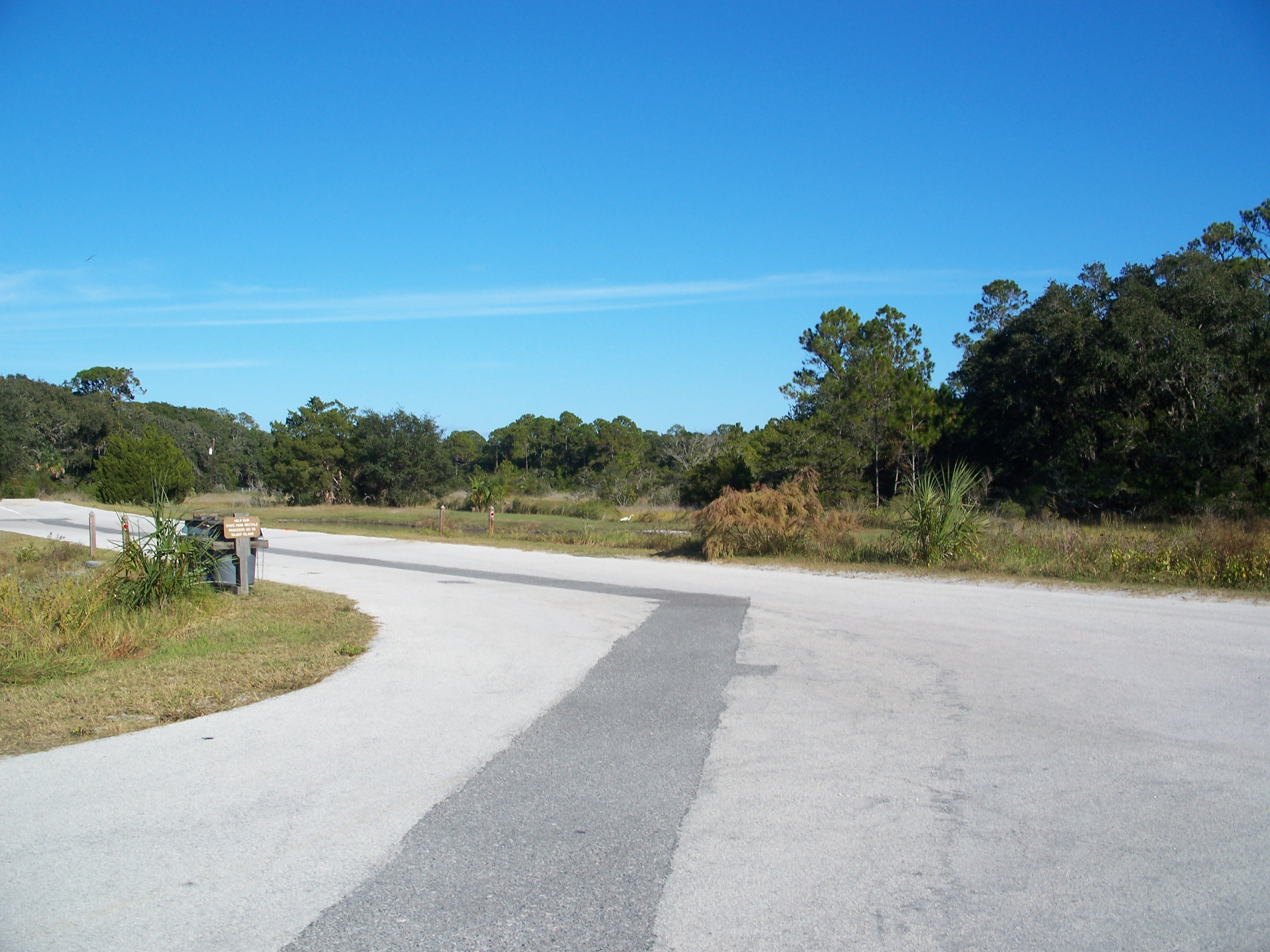

- Location within Florida Location within the United States
- Interactive map of Amelia Island State Park
- Location: Nassau County, Florida, USA
- Nearest city: Fernandina Beach, Florida
- Coordinates: 30.520527504320487°N 81.439299922449°W
- Area: 200 acres (81 ha)
- Governing body: Florida Department of Environmental Protection

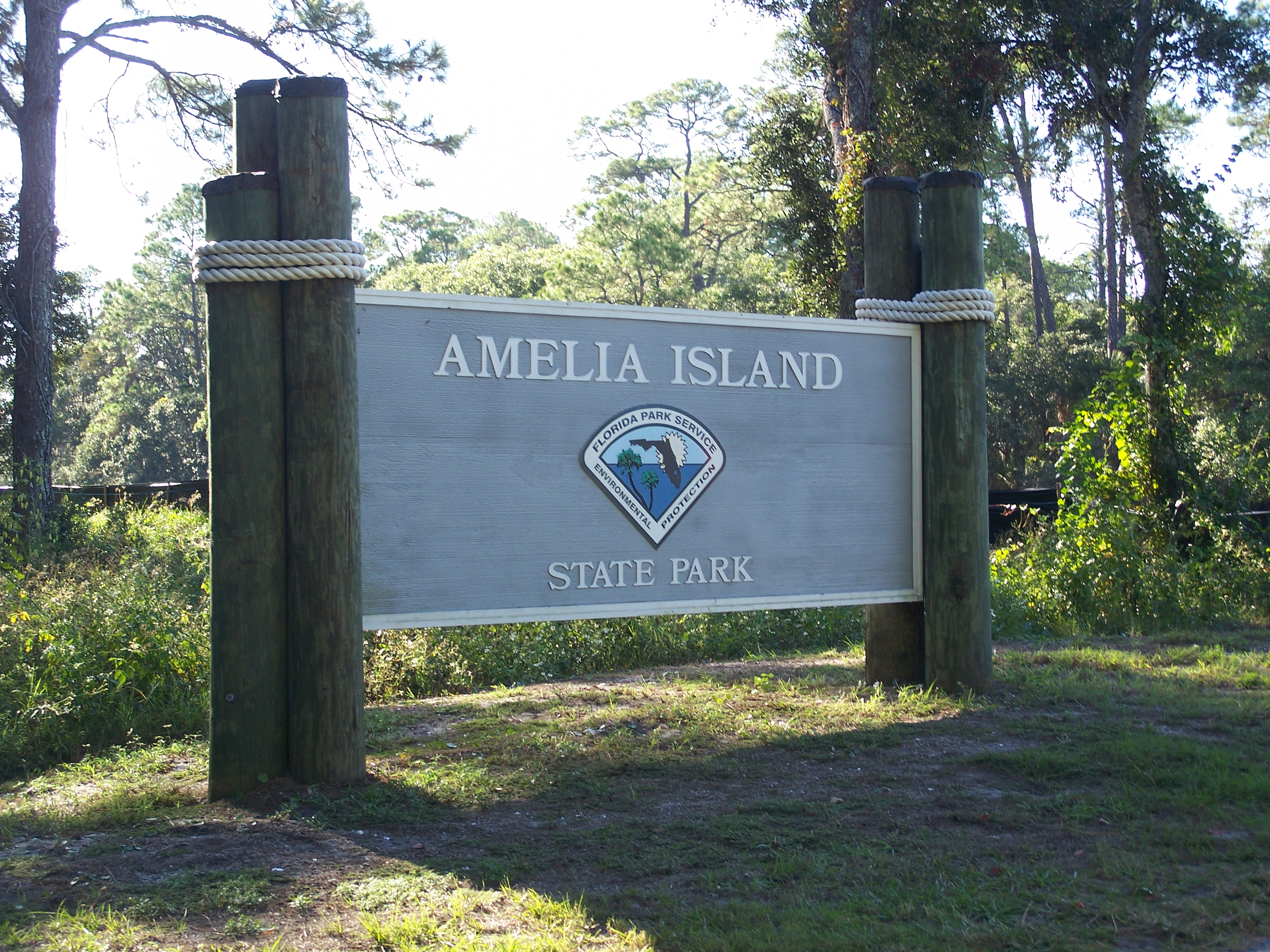

Amelia Island State Recreation Area is a state park in Florida, United States. Its location is 7 miles (11 km) north of Little Talbot Island State Park on SR A1A, and 8 miles (13 km) south of Fernandina Beach on Amelia Island along the Atlantic coastal plain. This park consists of 200 acres (0.81 km^{2}) of beaches, salt marshes and coastal maritime forests.

== References and external links ==
- Amelia Island State Recreation Area. Online. January 8, 2006.
- Amelia Island State Park at Florida State Parks

Specific
