= Pumpkin Hill Creek Preserve State Park =

State park in Florida, United States

- IUCN category V (protected landscape/seascape)
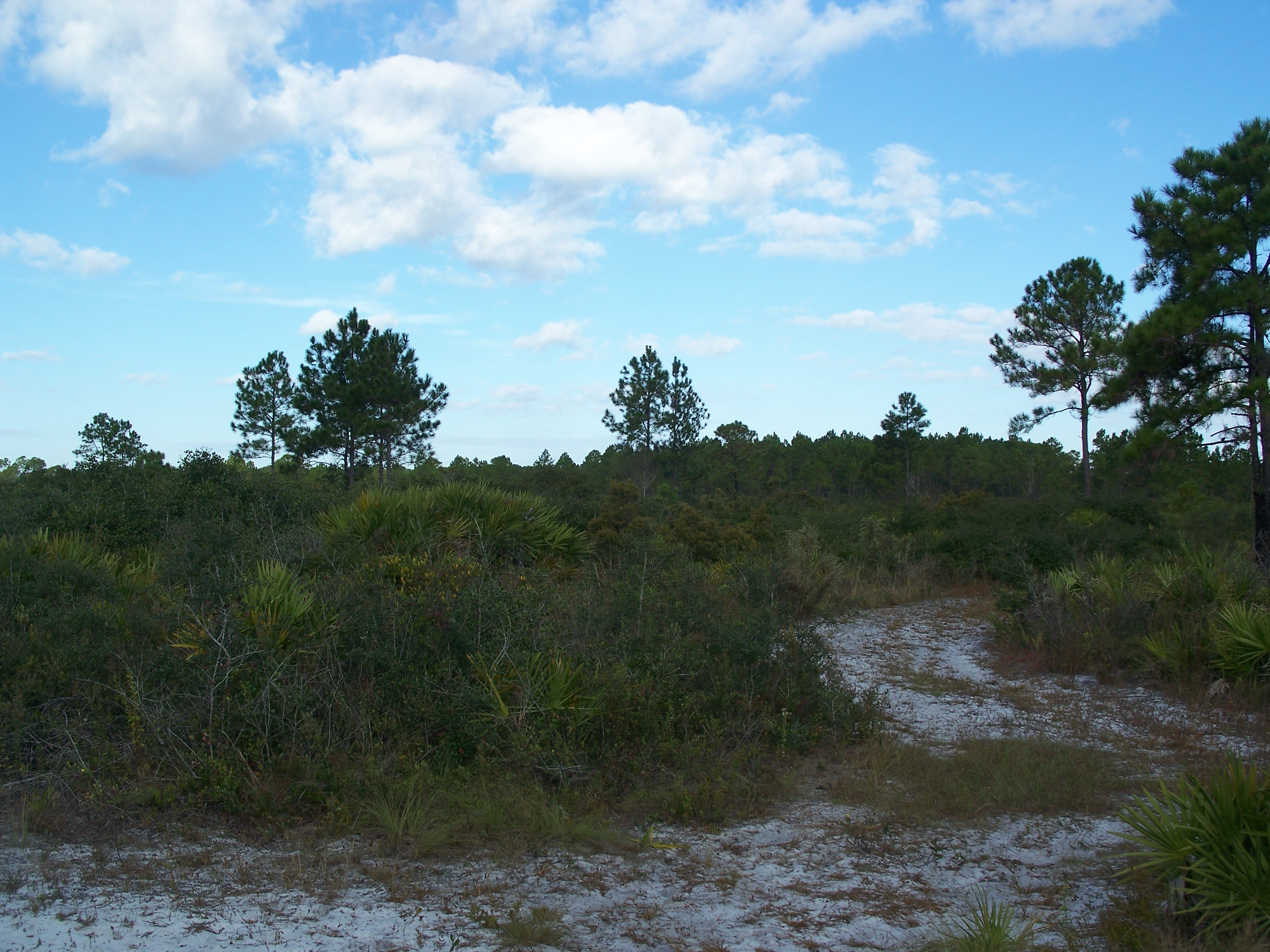

- Location within Florida Location within the United States
- Interactive map of Pumpkin Hill Creek Preserve State Park
- Location: Duval County, Florida, USA
- Nearest city: Jacksonville, Florida
- Coordinates: 30°27′56″N 81°29′12″W
- Governing body: Florida Department of Environmental Protection
- Website: http://www.floridastateparks.org/pumpkinhill

Pumpkin Hill Creek Preserve State Park is a Florida state park, located 19 kilometers (12 miles) north of Jacksonville, west of Big and Little Talbot Islands. From 1949 it has been part of the Talbot Islands State Park Complex.

== Admission and Hours ==
There is no entrance charge. Florida state parks are open between 8 a.m. and sundown every day of the year (including holidays).

== Gallery ==
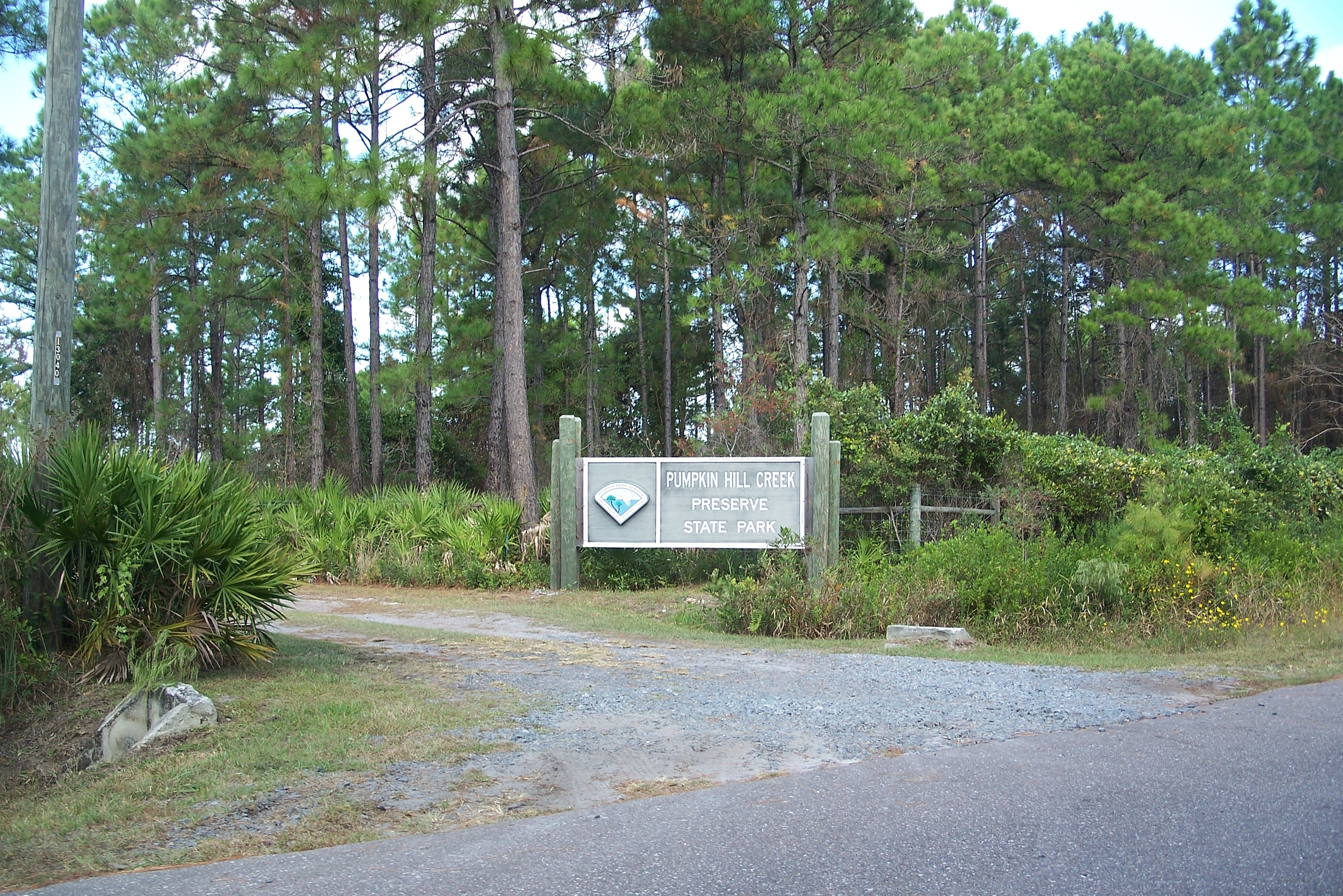
Entrance to trailhead area
