= Vance Smith =

American politician and businessman from Georgia

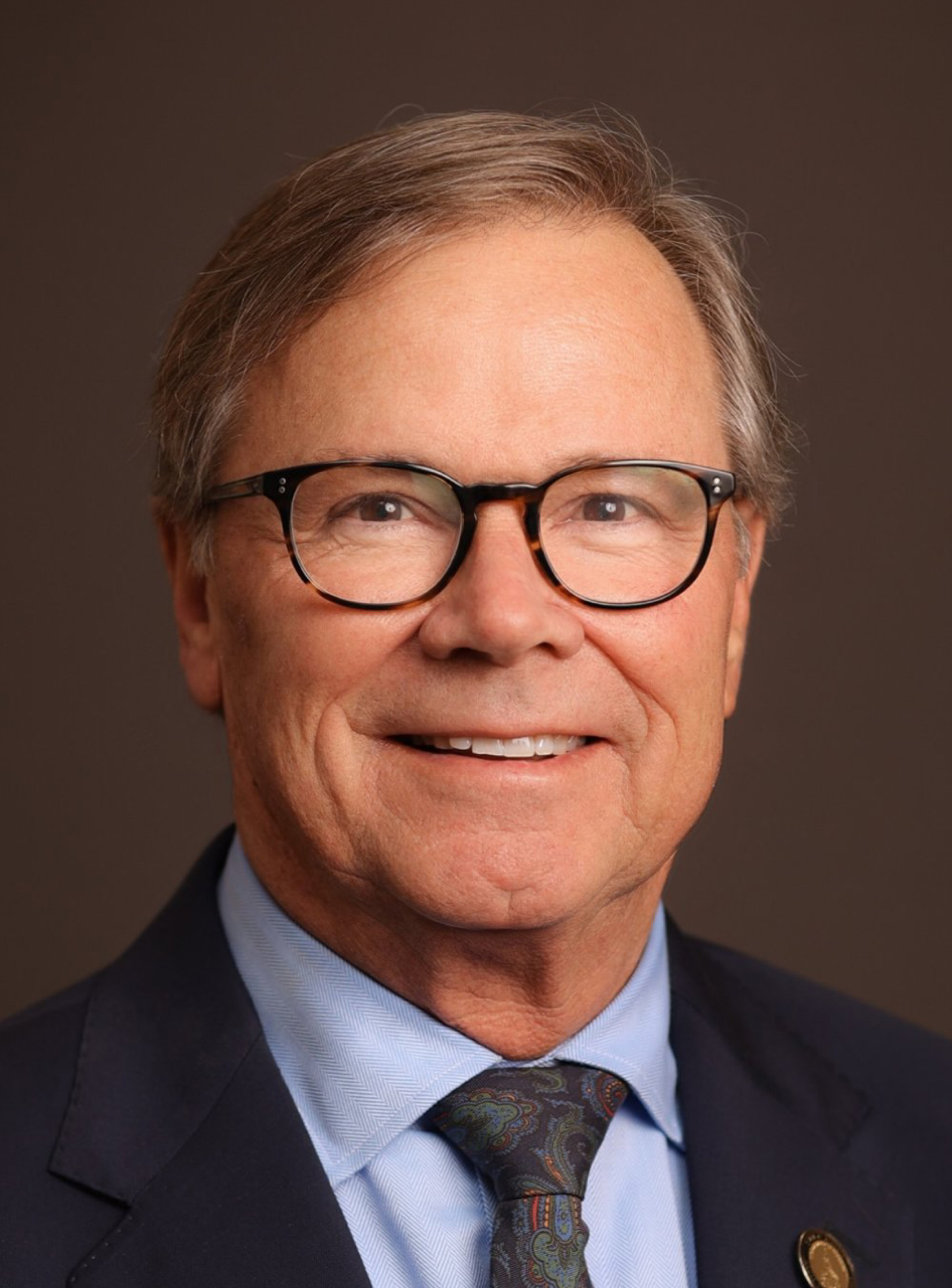
- Official headshot

Member of the Georgia House of Representatives
- Incumbent
- Assumed office January 14, 2019
- Preceded by: John Pezold
- Constituency: 133rd district (2019–2023); 138th District (2023–Present)
- In office January 11, 1993 – June 25, 2009
- Succeeded by: Kip Smith
- Constituency: 102nd district (1993–2003); 110th district (2003–2005); 129th district (2005–2009)

Personal details
- Born: February 27, 1952 (age 74)
- Party: Republican
- Spouse: Michele Smith
- Children: 3
- Education: Columbus State University
- Occupation: Businessman, politician
- Other names: Vance Smith Jr., Vance C. Smith Jr.

Vance Carlton Smith Jr. (born February 27, 1952) is an American politician and businessman from Georgia. Smith is a Republican member of the Georgia House of Representatives since 2019. He represented the 133rd district from 2019 to 2023, and the 138th district since 2023.

== Education ==
In 1974, Smith earned a Bachelor of Science degree in Economics from Columbus State University.

== Career ==
Smith is the founder and CEO of Vance Smith Contracting and Consulting. Prior to that, Smith acted as President and CEO of Vance Smith Construction Company which was founded in 1974.

From 2009-2011, Smith served as the commissioner of the Georgia Department of Transportation. Prior to his election as representative for the 133rd district, Smith had represented Harris, Muscogee, and Troup counties in the Georgia House of Representatives from 1993 to 2009.

On November 6, 2018, Smith won the election unopposed and became a Republican member of Georgia House of Representatives for District 133. On November 3, 2020, as an incumbent, Smith won the election unopposed and continued serving District 133.

Smith was appointed to the House Majority Deputy Whip Team for the 2019-2020 legislative term in 2019. Smith is the Vice Chairman of the Natural Resources & Environment committee and serves on the Economic Development & Tourism, Transportation, and Ways & Means committees as a member.

== Personal life ==
Smith's wife is Michele Smith. They have three children. Smith and his family live in Pine Mountain, Georgia.

Georgia House of Representatives
Preceded by John Pezold	Member of the Georgia House of Representatives from the 133rd district 2019–2023	Succeeded by Kenneth Vance
Preceded by Mike Cheokas	Member of the Georgia House of Representatives from the 138th district 2023–Present	Incumbent
