= Floyd Griffin =

American politician (born 1944)

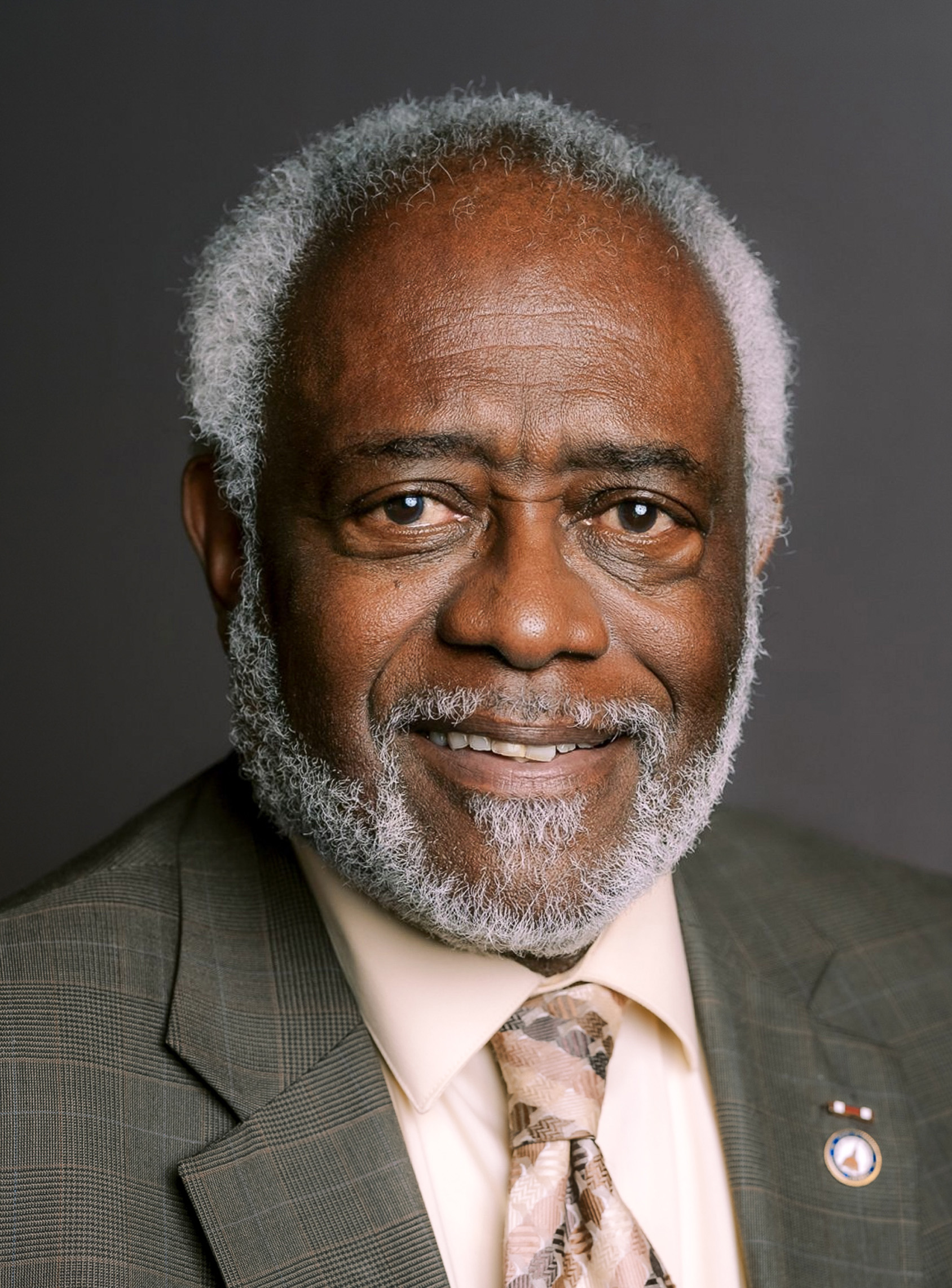

Member of the Georgia House of Representatives from the 149th district
- Incumbent
- Assumed office January 13, 2025
- Preceded by: Kenneth Vance (Redistricting)

Mayor of Milledgeville, Georgia
- In office 2001–2005
- Succeeded by: Richard Bentley

Member of the Georgia State Senate from the 25th district
- In office 1995–1999
- Preceded by: Wilbur Baugh
- Succeeded by: Faye Smith

Personal details
- Born: May 24, 1944 (age 82)
- Party: Democratic
- Spouse: Nathalie
- Children: 2
- Education: Gupton-Jones College (AS); Tuskegee Institute (BS); Florida Institute of Technology (MA); Army Command and General Staff College; National War College

Military service
- Branch/service: United States Army
- Years of service: 1967–1990
- Rank: Colonel
- Battles/wars: Vietnam War

Floyd L. Griffin Jr. (born May 24, 1944) is an American politician and retired U.S Army colonel. He served as the mayor of Milledgeville, Georgia, from 2001 to 2005, and represented the 25th district in the Georgia State Senate from 1995 to 1999 as a member of the Democratic Party. Griffin made notable bids for higher office, seeking the Lieutenant Governor of Georgia in 1998 and for Georgia Secretary of State in 2022.

== Early life and career ==
Floyd L. Griffin Jr. earned an Associate of Science in funeral service from Gupton-Jones College, a Bachelor of Science from the Tuskegee Institute in building construction, and a master's degree from the Florida Institute of Technology in contract procurement and management. He served in the United States Army and graduated from the Army Command and General Staff College and the National War College. Griffin flew combat helicopters missions during the Vietnam War. As an officer, Griffin taught military science at Wake Forest University and Winston-Salem State University. He also coached the offensive backfield for the Winston-Salem State Rams college football team.

Griffin retired from the Army in 1990 at the rank of colonel. He took over the family business, Slater's Funeral Home.

== Political career ==
In the 1994 elections, Griffin ran against Wilbur Baugh for the 25th district in the Georgia State Senate. Griffin defeated Baugh in a runoff election and was elected to the state senate without Republican opposition. He became the first African American to win a majority Caucasian district in the Georgia State Senate since the end of the Reconstruction era. In 1998, Griffin ran for lieutenant governor of Georgia. Griffin finished the primary election in fifth place. He ran to reclaim his seat in the Georgia Senate in the 2000 elections, but lost. He was elected mayor of Milledgeville in the 2001 election, and was sworn in on January 1, 2002. He served as mayor until 2006; Griffin lost reelection to Richard Bentley in the 2005 election.

Griffin published an autobiography, Legacy to Legend: Winners: Make it Happen, in 2009. He ran for the 25th district seat in the Georgia Senate in 2010, and lost to Johnny Grant. Griffin ran for mayor of Milledgeville in the 2015 election, but lost to Gary Thrower by 35 votes. He ran for the 145th district of the Georgia House of Representatives in the 2016 elections, and faced Rick Williams, who is also a funeral director. Griffin lost the election to Williams.

Griffin served as an at-large delegate at the 2020 Democratic National Convention. In May 2021, the city of Milledgeville dedicated a street in Griffin's honor. Griffin announced his candidacy for Georgia Secretary of State in the 2022 elections. Griffin was eliminated in the primary election, with Bee Nguyen and Dee Dawkins-Haigler advancing to a runoff election.

Griffin filed to run for Georgia’s newly reconfigured State House District 149 in 2024. The district was reconfigured as a result of a federal judge’s ruling that some current state house districts in Georgia deprive African-American communities of the chance to elect a candidate amongst themselves due to gerrymandering by the state’s Republican majority legislature. The 149th district’s new configuration favors the Democratic Party, and contains portions of Baldwin, Jones & Bibb Counties. In the November 2024 election, Griffin defeated incumbent Kenneth Vance, and assumed office in January 2025.

== Personal life ==
Griffin and his wife, Nathalie, have two children.
