= Charles E. Bennett (politician) =

American politician

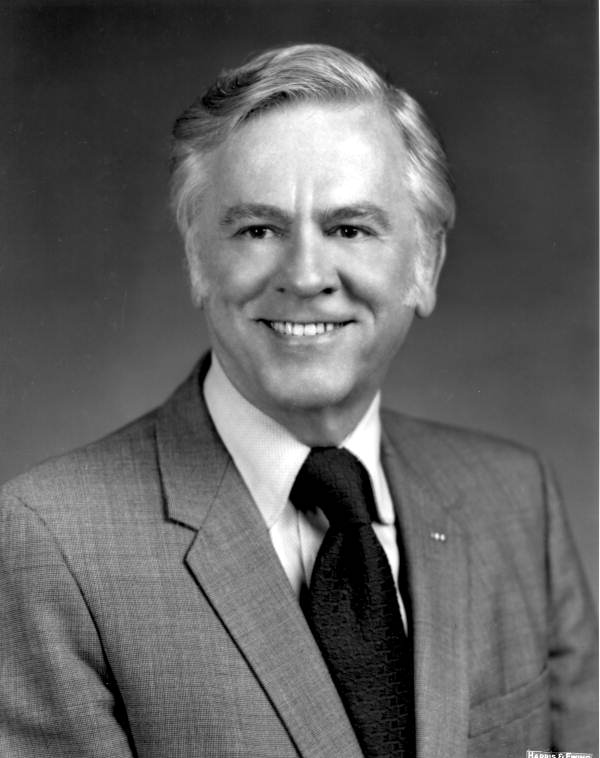

Member of the U.S. House of Representatives from Florida
- In office January 3, 1949 – January 3, 1993
- Preceded by: Emory H. Price
- Succeeded by: Tillie Fowler (Redistricting)
- Constituency: 2nd district (1949-1967); 3rd district (1967-1993)

Personal details
- Born: Charles Edward Bennett; December 2, 1910 Canton, New York, U.S.
- Died: September 6, 2003 (aged 92) Jacksonville, Florida, U.S.
- Party: Democratic
- Spouse: Dorothy Jean
- Occupation: Politician
- Charles E. Bennett's voice Bennett commemorates the 40th anniversary of the G.I. Bill of Rights; Recorded June 21, 1984

Charles Edward Bennett (December 2, 1910 – September 6, 2003) was an American politician serving as a member of the United States House of Representatives from Florida from 1949 to 1993. He was a Democrat who resided in Jacksonville, Florida. He is the longest-serving member of either house of Congress in Florida's history.

== Early years ==
He was born in Canton, New York and moved to Florida by the end of his childhood. He graduated from high school in Tampa. Bennett was an Eagle Scout and received the Distinguished Eagle Scout Award from the Boy Scouts of America.

In the history of the University of Florida, he is the only person to have served both as editor of the student newspaper (The Independent Florida Alligator), and president of the student body. As editor of the Alligator, he wrote editorial in favor of isolation and against the nation becoming involved in foreign wars.

Bennett earned his bachelor's degree in 1932, then enrolled in the Law School. After graduating with a Juris Doctor in 1934, he practiced law in Jacksonville and was elected to the Florida state legislature in 1941.

He resigned in March 1942 to join the United States Army and served with distinction in New Guinea as a guerrilla fighter during the Japanese occupation of the Philippines. While overseas, he contracted polio which left his legs paralyzed for the remainder of his life. He went through 16 months of rehabilitation at a military hospital in Arkansas, then utilized leg braces, canes or crutches to walk. He received the Philippine Legion of Honor and the Gold Cross. In the U.S., he was awarded the Bronze and Silver Stars and was discharged as a captain in 1947.

He married wife Dorothy Jean in 1953 and they had four children: Lucinda (Cindy), Charles Junior (who died in 1977 from a drug overdose), James and Bruce.

== Political career ==
After the war, he was elected to Congress from what was then the 2nd District. He was re-elected 21 more times from this Jacksonville-based district, which was renumbered as the 3rd District in 1967. He rarely faced serious opposition, even as the district became increasingly friendly to Republicans nationally. For instance, in 1972 he won 82 percent of the vote against a nominal Republican challenger (one of only six times the Republicans even put up a challenger against him) even as Richard Nixon carried the district by over 70 percent of the vote.

In 1951, he began proposing a code of ethics for government employees, nicknamed The Ten Commandments. After the Sherman Adams affair, the document was adopted as the first code of ethics for government service in 1958. In 1955, he sponsored the bill that added the words In God We Trust to the nation's currency. He signed the 1956 Southern Manifesto, and voted against the Civil Rights Acts of 1957, 1960, 1964, and 1968, but voted in favor of the Voting Rights Act of 1965.

To prove to his constituents that his handicap did not interfere with his serving in Congress, he amassed the record for the longest unbroken string of recorded roll call votes without being absent when the roll was called. Each year, he returned his veteran's disability pension and Social Security checks to the U. S. Treasury to reduce the national debt. Leftover campaign funds were given to the National Park Service. According to The Almanac of American Politics 1980, "He opposes unofficial office accounts, outside income for members and congressional pay raises, which led one colleague to call him 'a bit too pious.' "

However, his staunch ethical stance appeared to be too much for his colleagues in the House of Representatives, who nicknamed him, "Mr. Clean". Although he was responsible for the establishment of the first temporary committee on ethics in the House, he was not named to the first formal ethics committee when it was formed.

Not surprisingly, given the large defense presence in the Jacksonville area, Bennett was somewhat hawkish on defense policy. He was in line to become chairman of the House Armed Services Committee in 1985, one of the most powerful panels in the body; he had served on that committee for virtually all of his House career. However, he was defeated for the post by Les Aspin. While Aspin had far less seniority than Bennett, his views on defense policy were more in line with the rest of the Democratic Caucus.

Bennett was set to run for a 23rd term in 1992 in the newly renumbered 4th District against Jacksonville City Council president Tillie Fowler, his strongest Republican opponent in decades. However, he abruptly ended his bid for reelection when his wife became ill in the spring of 1992. Fowler went on to win easily in November against a replacement candidate. Proving how Republican the district had become, a Democrat would not file in this district again until 2000.

At the time of his retirement, Bennett was the second longest-serving member of the House (behind only fellow Democrat Jamie Whitten). He is still the longest-serving member of either house of Congress in Florida's history.

=== Election results ===
Florida's 3rd congressional district, 1980:

- Charles E. Bennett (D) - 104,672 (77.07%)
- Harry Radcliffe (R) - 31,208 (23.0%)

Florida's 3rd congressional district, 1982:

- Charles E. Bennett (D) - 73,802 (84.1%)
- George Grimsley (R) - 13,972 (15.9%)

Florida's 3rd congressional district, 1990:

- Charles E. Bennett (D) - 84,280 (72.7%)
- Rod Sullivan (R) - 31,727 (27.3%)

== History ==
Charles Bennett was a historical scholar who researched and wrote nine books about the history of north Florida, including General MacGregor: Hero or Rogue about Gregor MacGregor, Laudonniere & Fort Caroline, Three Voyages and Twelve on the River St. Johns. The Fort Caroline National Memorial and the Timucuan Ecological and Historic Preserve were both created through his efforts. He is the only person to receive the Jacksonville Historical Society's Lifetime Achievement Award, and the society stated, "His contributions of original research and his additions to the body of knowledge on the area's history are staggering." The Charles E. and Dorothy J. Bennett Fund was established in 2008 at the University of Florida to encourage research and publication of Florida history.

== Death and legacy ==
Bennett suffered a heart attack and a stroke in 2002, after which he used a wheelchair. His health steadily declined, and he died in Jacksonville in 2003 at age 92. His ashes were interred at Arlington National Cemetery.

The Charles E. Bennett Federal Building at 400 West Bay Street in Jacksonville is named after him as is the Charles E. Bennett Elementary School in Green Cove Springs, Florida. The bridge over the Intracoastal Waterway on Jacksonville's Wonderwood Connector was dedicated on August 27, 2004 as the Charles E. Bennett Memorial Bridge.

A life-size cast bronze statue of Bennett was installed on a granite base in a shady corner of Hemming Plaza in Jacksonville on April 23, 2004.

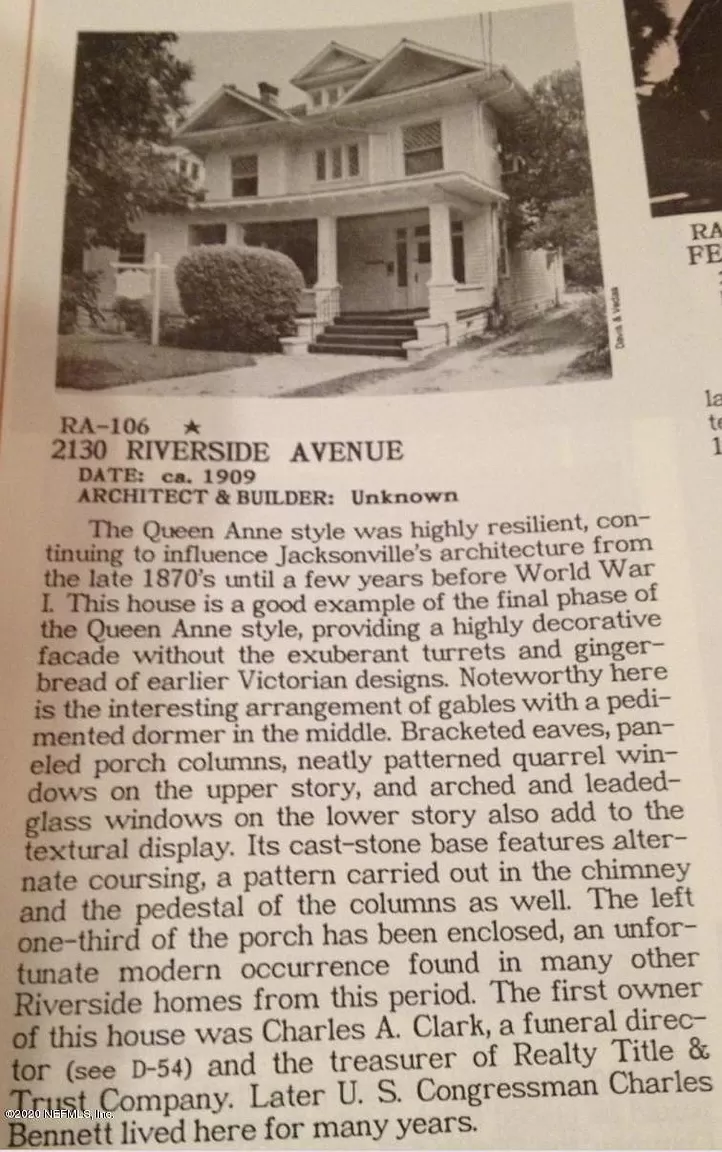
Bennett's home in the Riverside neighborhood of Jacksonville, Florida.

== Publications ==
- General MacGregor: Hero or Rogue ISBN 0970498721, River City Press 2001
- Laudonniere & Fort Caroline ISBN 081731122X, University of Alabama Press, 2001
- Three Voyages ISBN 0817311211, University of Alabama Press, 2001
- Twelve on the River St. Johns ISBN 0813009138, University Press of Florida 1989
- A Quest for Glory: Major General Robert Howe and the American Revolution ISBN 0807819824, University of North Carolina Press 1991
- Florida's "French" Revolution, 1793-1795 University Press of Florida 1982
- Settlement of Florida University of Florida Press 1968

U.S. House of Representatives
Preceded by Emory H. Price	Member of the U.S. House of Representatives from Florida's 2nd congressional district 1949–1967	Succeeded by Don Fuqua
Preceded by Claude Pepper	Member of the U.S. House of Representatives from Florida's 3rd congressional district 1967–1993	Succeeded by Corrine Brown
Political offices
Preceded by L. Richardson Preyer; North Carolina	Chairman of House Ethics Committee; 1979–1981	Succeeded by Louis Stokes; Ohio
