= Georgia's 133rd House of Representatives district =

State district in Georgia, USA

Georgia's 133rd State House of Representatives district
Representative
Danny Mathis; R–Cochran
- Demographics: 73.8% White; 19.9% Black; 2.6% Hispanic; 1.9% Asian
- Population: 54,585

District 133 elects one member of the Georgia House of Representatives. It contains the entirety of Bleckley County, Dodge County, Twiggs County and Wilkinson County as well as parts of Telfair County.

== Members ==
- Vance Smith (2019–2023)
- Kenneth Vance (2023–2025)
- Danny Mathis (since 2025)
