= Boneyard Beach (Florida) =

Beach in Florida, United States

Coordinates: 30.5031°N 81.4497°W

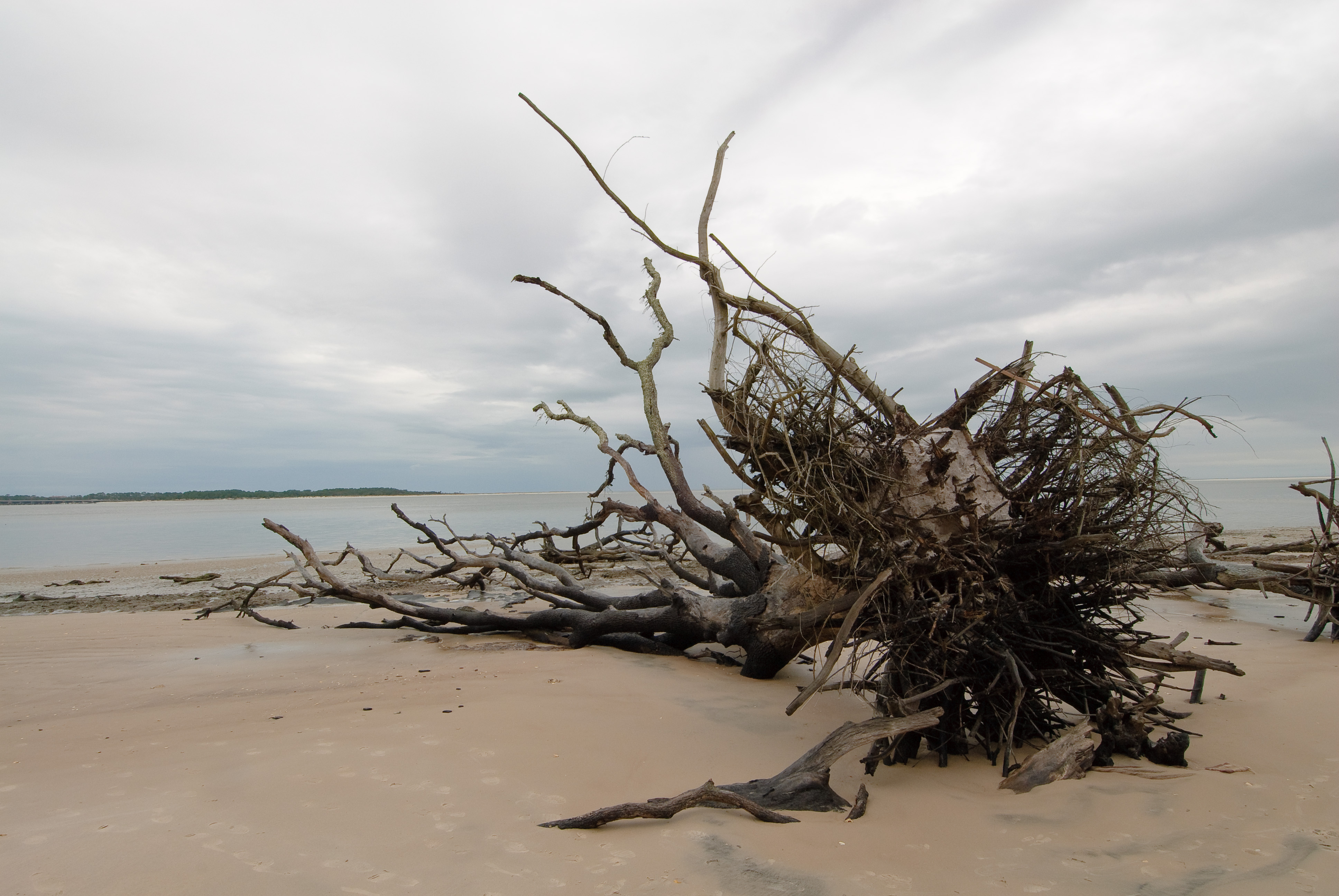
Boneyard Beach

Boneyard Beach is a mile-long beach in Big Talbot Island State Park, near the city of Fernandina Beach, Florida, south of Amelia Island down the First Coast Highway. The "boneyard beach" is so called because of the bleached skeletons of oaks along the beach. By coincidence park archaeologists have also found fossilized mammoth bones on the beach nearly as big as the trees. Big Talbot's Boneyard Beach is not recommended for swimming but is popular with photographers. The beach lies beyond a 20-foot bluff. The beach can be accessed from The Bluffs Scenic Shoreline Picnic Area. A half-mile Shoreline Trail from the picnic area parking lot leads to the north end of Boneyard Beach; during shorebird breeding season, the beach area immediately adjacent to the picnic area is closed to the public.
