= Timucuan Ecological and Historic Preserve =

Wetlands in Florida (US) managed by the National Park Service

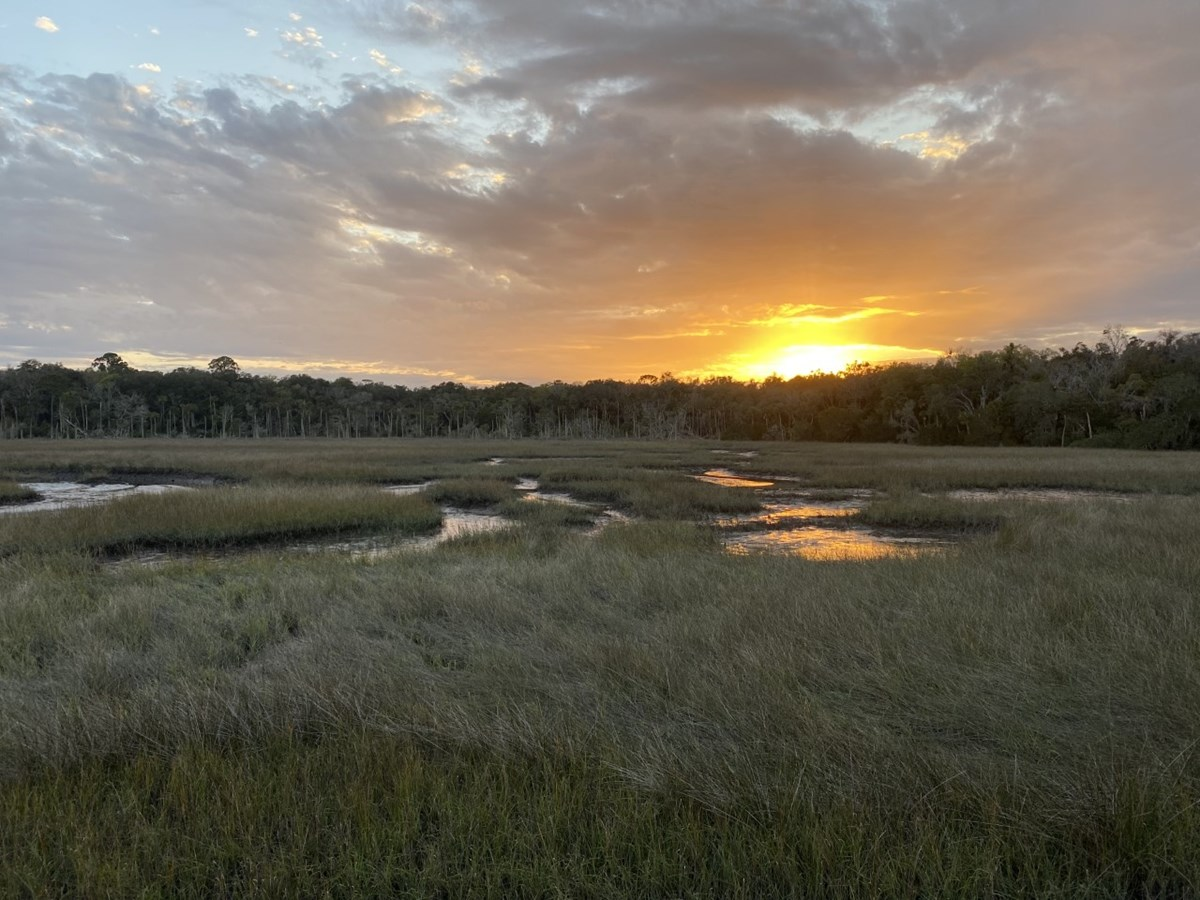
- Salt marsh at Timucuan

- Location within Florida Location within the United States
- Location: Jacksonville, Florida, United States
- Nearest city: Jacksonville, Florida
- Coordinates: 30°27′16″N 81°27′00″W
- Area: 46,000 acres (190 km^{2})
- Established: February 16, 1988
- Visitors: 1,102,223 (in 2022)
- Governing body: National Park Service in cooperation with other agencies
- Website: Timucuan Ecological and Historic Preserve
- Timucuan Ecological and Historic Preserve
- U.S. National Register of Historic Places
- Location: 13165 Mt. Pleasant Rd., Jacksonville, Florida
- Area: 46,000 acres (19,000 ha)
- NRHP reference No.: 01000283
- Added to NRHP: February 16, 1988

The Timucuan Ecological and Historic Preserve is a U.S. National Preserve in Jacksonville, Florida. It comprises 46,000 acres (19,000 ha) of wetlands, waterways, and other habitats in northeastern Duval County. Managed by the National Park Service in cooperation with the City of Jacksonville and Florida State Parks, it includes natural and historic areas such as the Fort Caroline National Memorial and the Kingsley Plantation.

The preserve was established in 1988 and expanded in 1999 by Preservation Project Jacksonville.

== Background ==
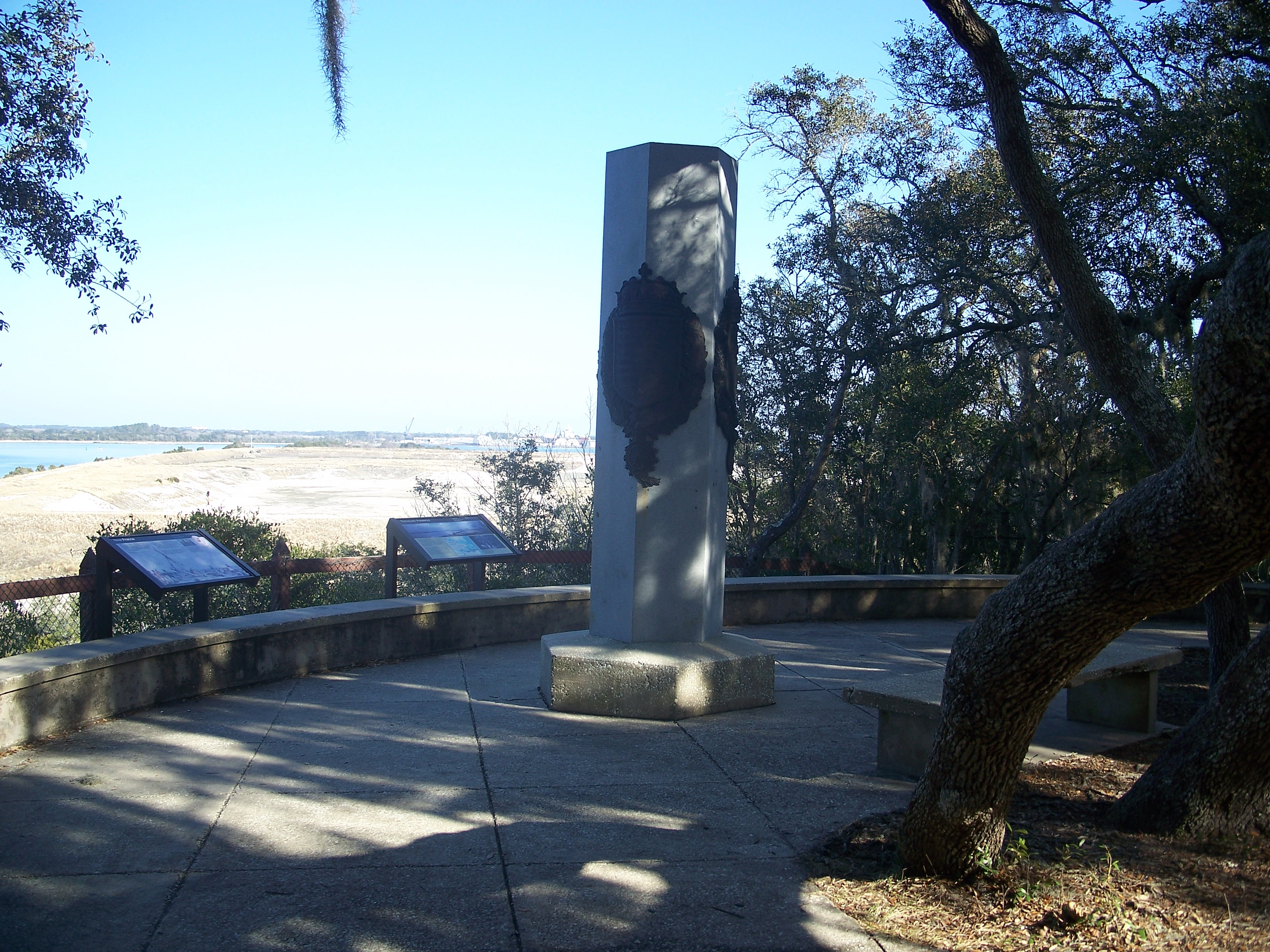
Ribault monument, in the Preserve, with the St. Johns River in the background

The Fort Caroline National Memorial is located in the Timucuan Preserve, as is the Kingsley Plantation, the oldest standing plantation in the state. The Preserve is maintained through cooperation by the National Park Service, the Florida Department of Environmental Protection and the City of Jacksonville Department of Parks and Recreation, which partner to support the Timucuan Parks Foundation. It is named for the Timucua Indians who had 35 chiefdoms throughout northern Florida and south Georgia at the time of Spanish colonization.

Archeological excavation by a University of North Florida team has revealed more information about indigenous peoples in the area. On Black Hammock Island, they have discovered remnants of the second-oldest pottery in the United States, dating to 2500 BCE. (There have been slightly older finds in the Savannah River area.)

They also have excavated more recent artifacts contemporary with the Mocama chiefdom. In the last 25 years, these Native American people have been recognized as distinct from the Timucua, although they spoke a Timucuan dialect. Their chiefdom extended from the St. Johns River to St. Simons Island, Georgia.

Archeologists believe they have found evidence of a Spanish mission on the island as well. San Juan del Puerto, one of the oldest Spanish missions in Florida, was established here during the 16th century. Franciscan brothers were missionaries to the Timucua and Guale Indians along the coast, whose territory included the Sea Islands in Georgia and up to the Savannah River.

On June 9, 2020, the Preserve gained another 2,500 acres of marshland along the Nassau River from two private land trusts.

== Trails ==
Several trails allow the public to explore the natural habitats protected at the preserve.

- Fort Caroline National Memorial
  - Hammock Trail
  - Spanish Pond
- Theodore Roosevelt Area
  - Timucuan Trail
  - Willie Browne Trail with bird observation platform
- Cedar Point
  - Cedar Point Loop Trail
  - Pinelands Trail
- Fort George Island
  - Saturiwa Trail
- Big Talbot Island State Park
  - Shoreline Trail
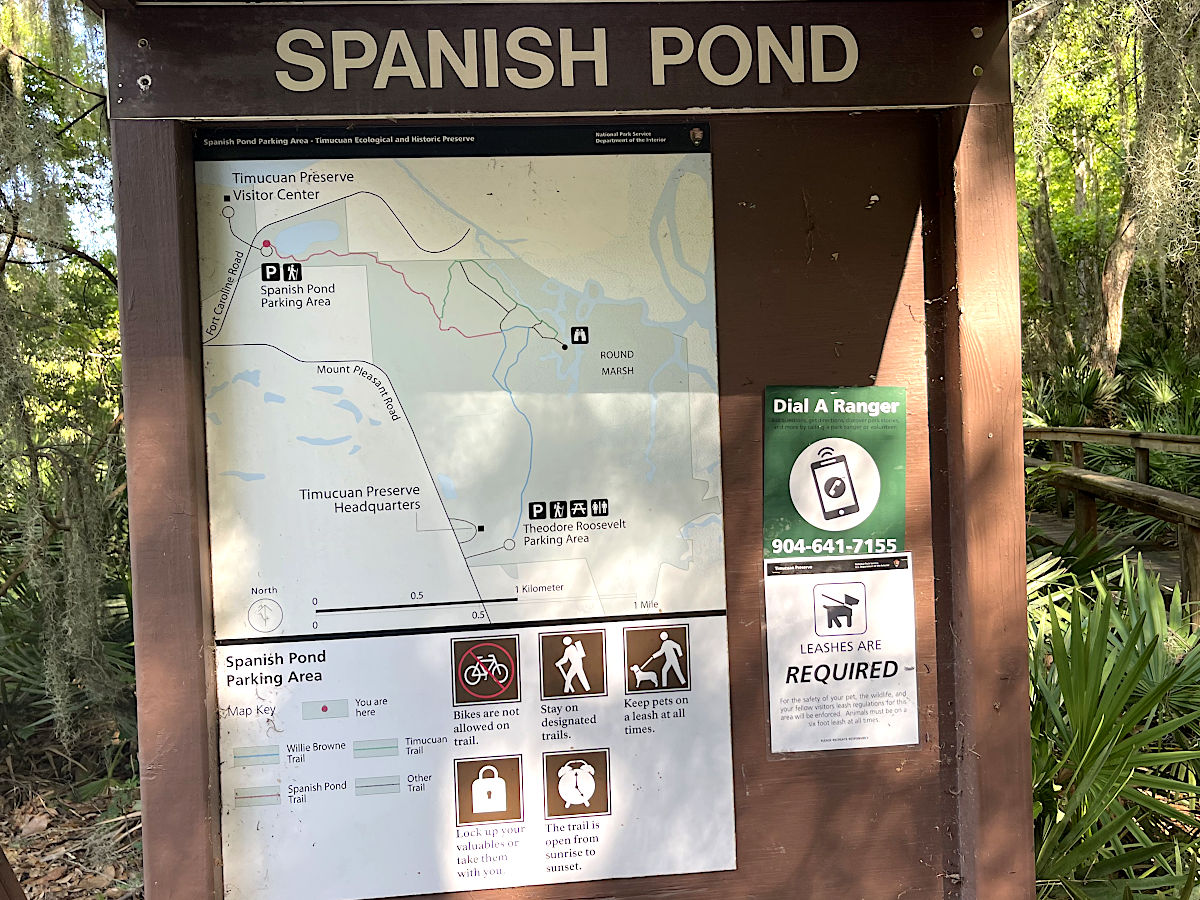
Sign at Spanish Pond

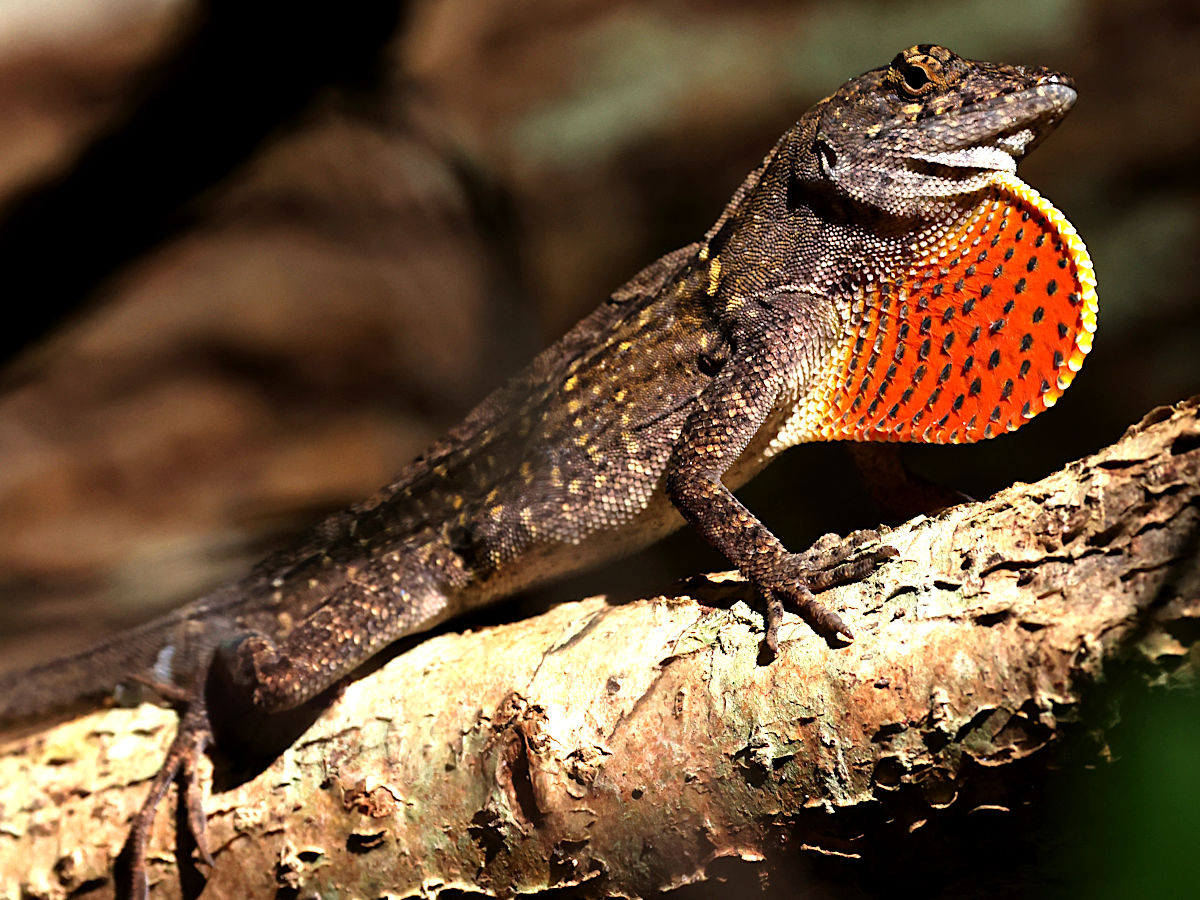
Brown anole at Spanish Pond

== Visitor Center ==
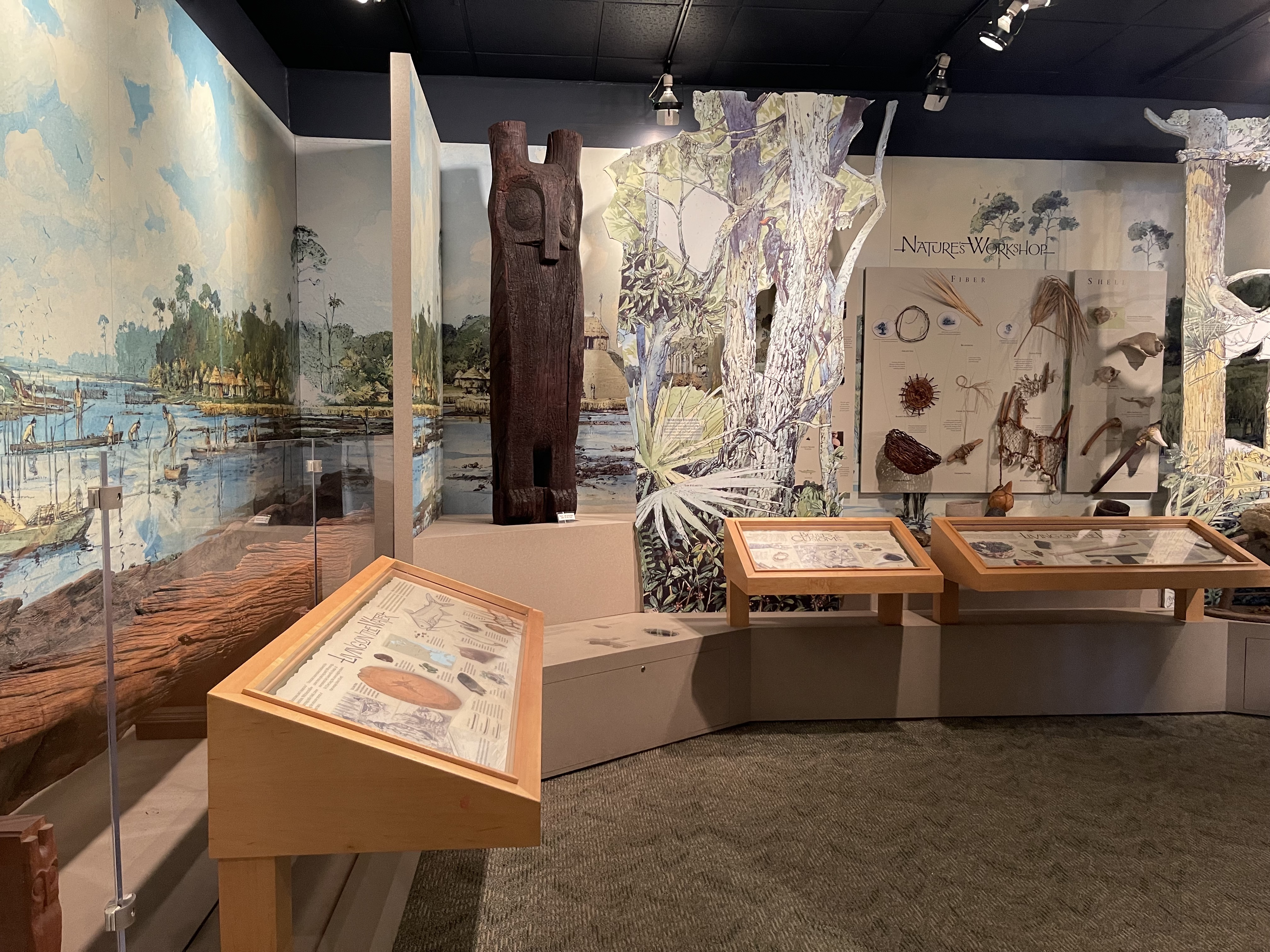
A section of the "Where the Waters Meet" exhibit located at the Timucuan Preserve Visitor Center

The Timucuan Preserve Visitor Center is located near the Fort Caroline National Monument. An exhibit called “Where the Waters Meet: The Ecology and History of the Timucuan Preserve” presents several panels of diagrams, illustrations, timelines, and information. The free exhibit collection includes artifacts as well as replicas of tools, weapons, and the materials used to create them, such as shells and tree fibers.

The Preserve hosts “Artist in Residence” programs annually, allowing local artists to live at the Kingsley Plantation for two- to six-week periods, during which time the artist(s) create original works of art influenced by the area. Some of these works are then displayed in the visitor center at the end of the residency.

Community events hosted by the Preserve include “Artist in Residence,” Pop-Up Ranger talks, group hikes, and Junior Ranger activities.

== See also ==
- Big Talbot Island State Park
- Fort George Island Cultural State Park
- Little Talbot Island State Park
- Kingsley Plantation
