= Georgia's 138th House of Representatives district =

State district in Georgia, USA

Georgia's 138th State House of Representatives district
Representative
Vance Smith; R–Pine Mountain
- Demographics: 49.4% White; 40.4% Black; 6.2% Hispanic; 1.5% Asian
- Population: 52,522

District 138 elects one member of the Georgia House of Representatives. It contains parts of Harris County, Muscogee County and Troup County.

== Members ==
- Mike Cheokas (2019–2023)
- Vance Smith (since 2023)
