= Tillie Fowler =

American politician (1942–2005)

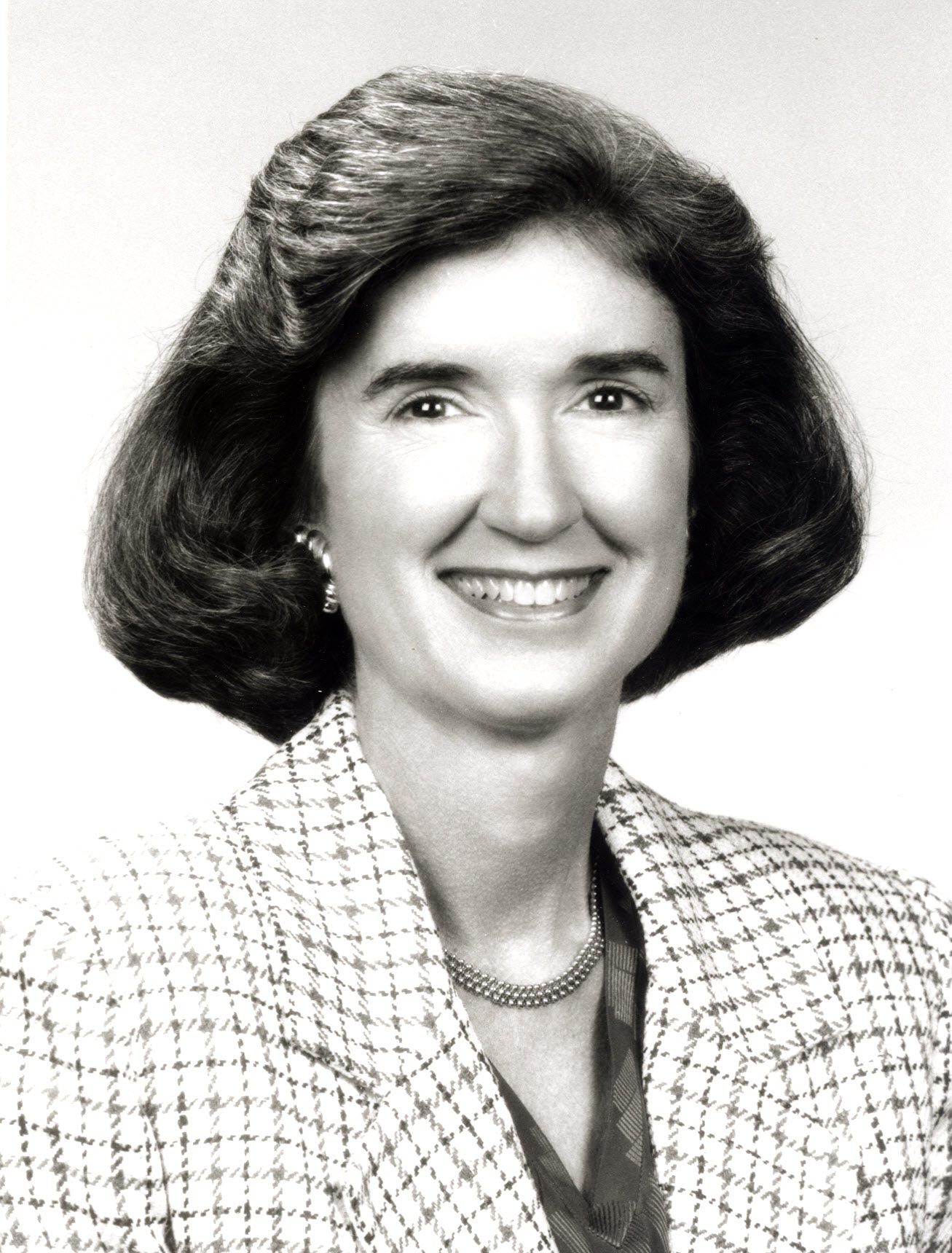

Vice Chair of the House Republican Conference
- In office January 3, 1999 – January 3, 2001
- Leader: Dennis Hastert
- Preceded by: Jennifer Dunn
- Succeeded by: Deborah Pryce

Secretary of the House Republican Conference
- In office July 17, 1997 – January 3, 1999
- Leader: Newt Gingrich
- Preceded by: Jennifer Dunn
- Succeeded by: Deborah Pryce

Member of the U.S. House of Representatives from Florida's 4th district
- In office January 3, 1993 – January 3, 2001
- Preceded by: Craig James
- Succeeded by: Ander Crenshaw

Personal details
- Born: Tillie Kidd; December 23, 1942 Milledgeville, Georgia, U.S.
- Died: March 2, 2005 (aged 62) Jacksonville, Florida, U.S.
- Party: Republican
- Spouse: Buck Fowler (m. 1968)
- Children: 2
- Parent: Culver Kidd Jr. (father)
- Relatives: Rusty Kidd (brother)
- Education: Emory University (BA, JD)

Tillie Kidd Fowler (December 23, 1942 – March 2, 2005) was an American lawyer and politician who served in the United States House of Representatives from Florida's 4th congressional district from 1993 to 2001. Her father and brother served as state legislators in Georgia. A Republican moderate, she was a strong advocate for defense spending.

== Early life and education ==
Tillie Kidd was born in Milledgeville, Georgia on December 23, 1942. Her father, Culver Kidd Jr., served in the Georgia General Assembly for 46 years, including 16 years in the state house and 30 in the state senate. Her brother, Rusty Kidd, served in the Georgia House of Representatives from 2009 to 2017. She graduated from Salem Academy in Winston-Salem, North Carolina in 1960 before earning her undergraduate degree from Emory University, where she was a member of Kappa Alpha Theta, in 1964. She earned a Juris Doctor degree from the Emory University School of Law three years later. Her father had encouraged her to attend law school because she was a fairly outspoken woman by the standards of the time. She was admitted to the bar soon after getting her degree. No Atlanta-area law firm would hire a woman at the time, but U.S. Representative Robert G. Stephens Jr. of Georgia hired her as a legislative assistant for three years. She then worked as general counsel in the White House Office of Consumer Affairs until 1971.

In 1968, she married L. Buck Fowler and moved to Jacksonville, Florida, where she changed her party affiliation from Democrat to Republican, to her father's chagrin. She was active in volunteer activities and the area Junior League, serving as the Jacksonville chapter's president from 1982 to 1983, and was elected to the Jacksonville City Council in 1985. In 1989, Fowler became the council's president.

== U.S. Congress ==
In 1992, Fowler won the Republican nomination for Florida's 4th Congressional District in Jacksonville. The district had previously been the 3rd, represented by 22-term incumbent Charlie Bennett, but had been renumbered as the 4th after Florida gained four districts in the 1990 United States census. Bennett, a Democrat, was the second-longest serving member of the House and the longest-serving member of either house of Congress in Florida history. Jacksonville had leaned Republican for some time (the city has only voted for the Democratic presidential nominee once since 1972 even though Democrats still have a substantial majority in registration), but Bennett seemed to have an unbreakable hold on the seat. Fowler was the seventh Republican to challenge him.

Early on, Fowler hammered Bennett for having been in Congress for too long (he had first won election a few days before her sixth birthday) and promised to serve no more than four terms in the House. Her slogan was "eight (years) is enough." Shortly after the campaign began, Bennett's wife fell ill and he abruptly announced his retirement. The Democrats drafted state senator Mattox Hair as a replacement nominee, but Hair had too little time to overcome a severe financial disadvantage and lost to Fowler by almost 13 points. Fowler became only the third person to represent the 4th since it was created in 1943 (it was the 2nd District until 1967 when it was renumbered the 3rd), and the first Republican. She was also the first Florida Republican woman elected to the House in her own right (Ileana Ros-Lehtinen of the Miami area first came to the House in 1989 to finish out the unexpired term of the late Claude Pepper). She was reelected three more times, all unopposed. Most of the city's blacks had been drawn into the majority-black 3rd District after the 1990 census.

Fowler's voting record was relatively moderate by Southern Republican standards. She was moderately pro-choice on abortion and refused to take money from the National Rifle Association of America. Her main interest, however, was in defense issues — not surprising given the large number of naval bases in the Jacksonville area. As the only Republican woman on the House Armed Services Committee, she blasted the Clinton administration's cuts in defense spending and subsequent increases in spending for peacekeeping missions. She tried to head off the shutdown of the naval firing range at Vieques, but was unsuccessful. Her interest in defense issues, as well as her demeanor, earned her the nickname "Steel Magnolia."

Tillie K. Fowler

Unlike most Republicans elected to Congress during the 1990s, Fowler had very good relations with Democrats. She was one of the few Republicans active in the Congressional Women's Caucus, and refused to campaign against incumbents with whom she had friendly relations. She was also an ardent feminist, vociferously protesting an article in Roll Call in which a picture of Republican women at a press conference only showed their legs and black pumps. She hired Stephanie Kopelousos as an intern in 1993; by 1998 Kopelousos was a senior legislative aide.

Fowler eventually rose to vice-chairwoman of the House Republican Conference (caucus), the number-five position among House Republicans (behind the Speaker, Majority Leader, Majority Whip and Republican Conference chair). This led her to broach the possibility of running for a fifth term in 2000. She came under considerable fire from term limits proponents. One group ran ads in Jacksonville calling her "Slick Tillie," a play on Clinton's nickname of "Slick Willie". Eventually, she decided to honor her original pledge and did not run for reelection in 2000.

== Personal life ==
She married L. Buck Fowler in 1968. They had two daughters, Tillie Anne and Elizabeth.

== Later career ==
Following her tenure in Congress, Fowler joined the prominent Washington law firm Holland & Knight as a partner. She also served as an advisor to Secretary of Defense Donald Rumsfeld on operational issues. She frequently lobbied her former colleagues on behalf of Jacksonville during debate over military base realignment and closures. In addition, she chaired the Department of Defense panel responsible for investigating the 2003 United States Air Force Academy sexual assault scandal.

In 2001, Fowler was appointed by Congress to the Commission on the Future of the United States Aerospace Industry.

== Death ==
Fowler died on March 2, 2005, of a brain hemorrhage in a hospital in Jacksonville, Florida.

== See also ==
- Women in the United States House of Representatives

U.S. House of Representatives
Preceded by Craig James	Member of the U.S. House of Representatives from Florida's 4th congressional district 1993–2001	Succeeded by Ander Crenshaw
Party political offices
Preceded by Jennifer Dunn	Secretary of the House Republican Conference; 1997–1999	Succeeded by Deborah Pryce
Preceded by Jennifer Dunn	Vice Chair of the House Republican Conference; 1999–2001	Succeeded by Deborah Pryce
