= Big Talbot Island State Park =

State park in Florida, United States

- IUCN category IV (habitat/species management area)
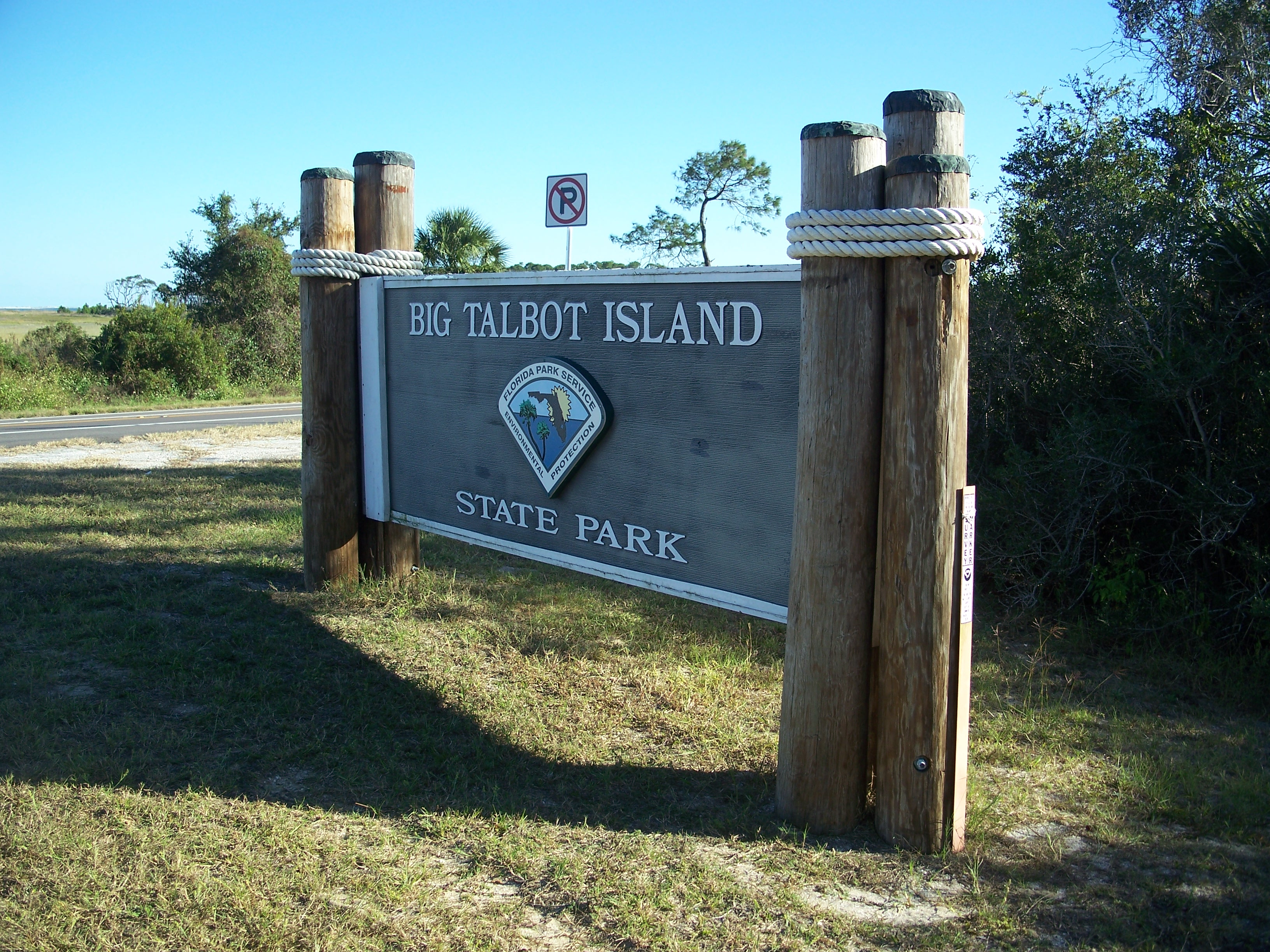
- Sign by entrance

- Location within Florida Location within the United States
- Interactive map of Big Talbot Island State Park
- Location: Duval County, Florida, USA
- Nearest city: Jacksonville, Florida
- Coordinates: 30°28′59″N 81°26′24″W
- Area: 1,679.82 acres (679.80 ha)
- Established: 1982
- Governing body: Florida Department of Environmental Protection

Big Talbot Island State Park is a state park in Florida, United States. It is located on Big Talbot Island, a coastal barrier island 20 miles east of downtown Jacksonville on A1A North and immediately north of Little Talbot Island State Park along the Atlantic coastal plain.

The park is a nature preserve and a location for nature study, bird-watching, or photography. Other activities include hiking, bicycling, fishing, boating, canoeing, kayaking, and picnicking. Amenities include picnic pavilions, nature trails, a fishing pier, a boat ramp, bike trails and beaches. The park is open from 8:00 am till sundown year round.

The coastal landscape and beach at Big Talbot Island is unique within the state of Florida for its rock-like sedimentary hardpan soil deposits underlying the surface. Where these formations are exposed in the shallow waters surrounded the island they provide habitat for molluscs, crabs, oysters, and other tide pool creatures. The formations and sand on Blackrock Beach are much darker in contrast to the coquina formations at Washington Oaks State Gardens, about 60 miles southward on the coastal highway A1A, and the limestone outcroppings at Blowing Rocks Preserve over 250 miles further south. The beach can be accessed through the park entrance or through the trailhead parking area adjacent to the Blackrock Trail. At the end of the Blackrock Trail is Boneyard Beach. Here, skeletons of oaks sit along the shoreline. Big Talbot's Boneyard Beach is not recommended for swimming but is popular with photographers.

Big Talbot and Little Talbot are two of only a few remaining undeveloped barrier islands within Florida. They were first inhabited by a Native American group called the Timucua. Beginning with the arrival of the French in 1562, France, England, and Spain claimed the islands as colonial territory. In 1735, General James Oglethorpe named the Talbot Islands in honor of Charles Talbot, Lord High Chancellor of Great Britain. Along with the bordering Timucuan Ecological and Historic Preserve, the islands are representative of several ecosystems and support a number of diverse natural habitats abundant with wildlife.

== Ecology ==
Habitats preserved by the park include beach, coastal scrub, coastal hammock, estuary, and tidal marshes. Parts of the salt marsh surrounding Big Talbot Island are included in the Machaba Balu Preserve.

== Flora ==
Vegetation includes southern live oaks (Quercus virginiana), hollies, magnolias, hickories (Carya spp.), cabbage palmettos (Sabal palmetto), sea oats, and saw palmettos (Serenoa repens).

== Fauna ==
This state park is home to alligators, sea turtles, Florida gopher tortoises, West Indian manatees, white-tailed deer, river otters, marsh rabbits, raccoons, bobcats, foxes, Virginia opossums, eastern gray squirrels, eastern garter snakes, Carolina anoles, broad-headed skinks, pileated woodpeckers, northern cardinals, bald eagles, barred owls, peregrine falcons, painted buntings, and Florida scrub jays.

== Gallery ==
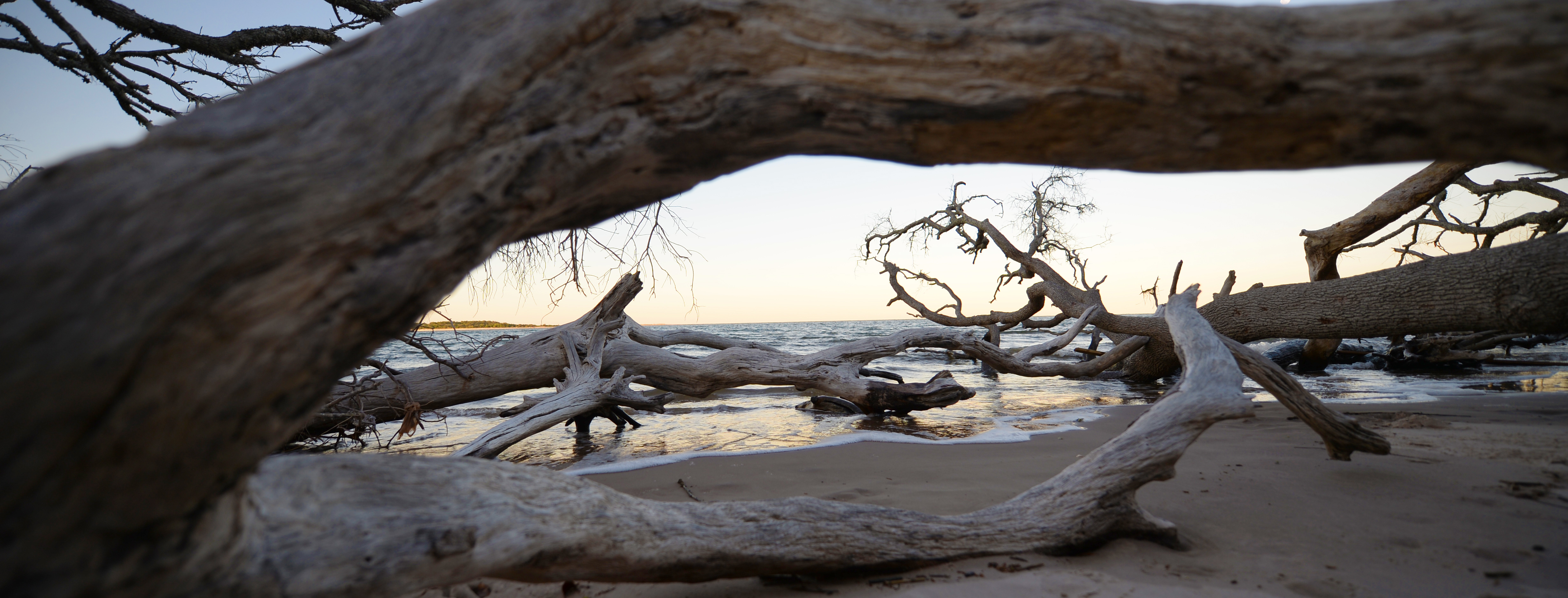
Driftwood on the beach is common

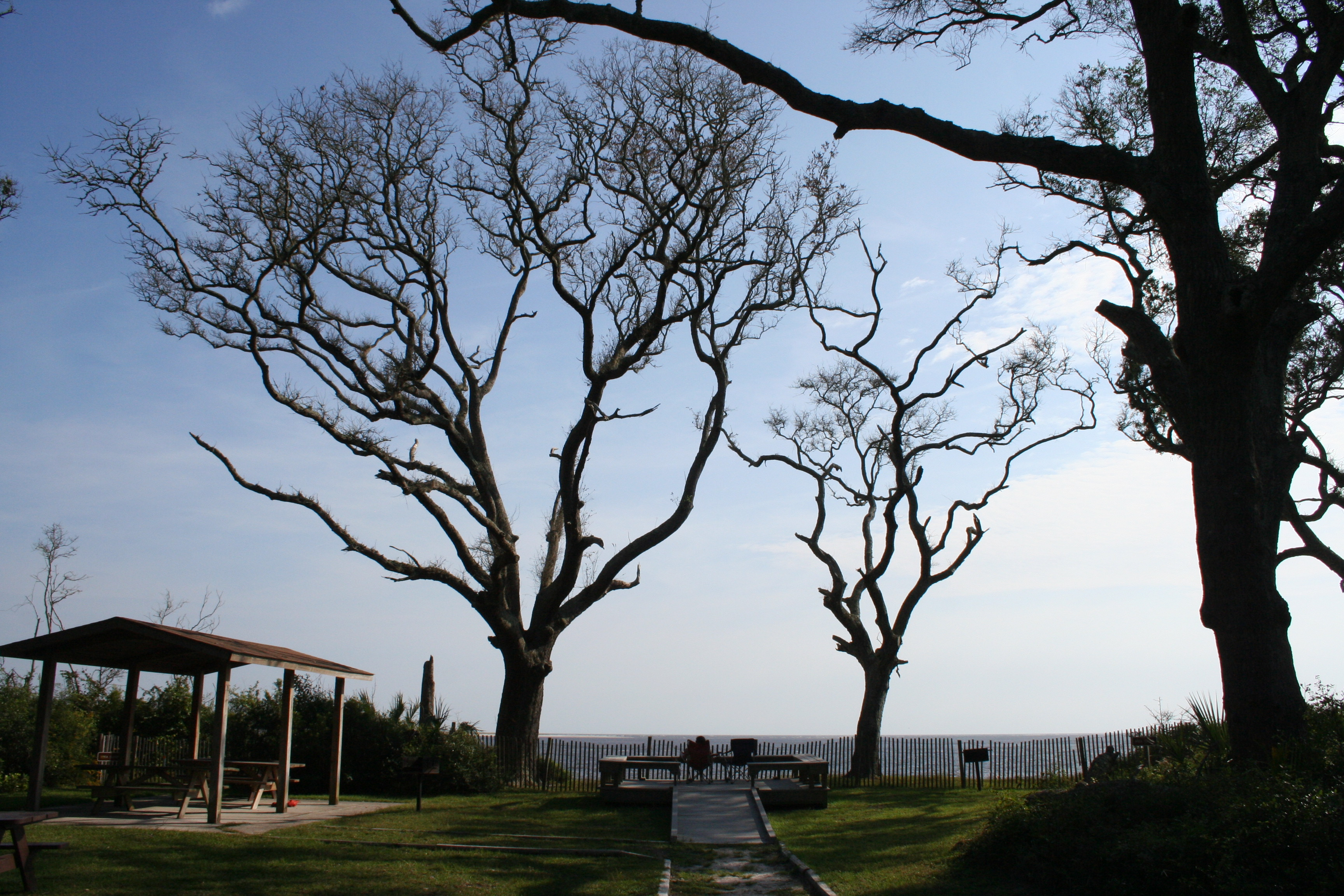
Picnic shelter and deck, Big Talbot Island

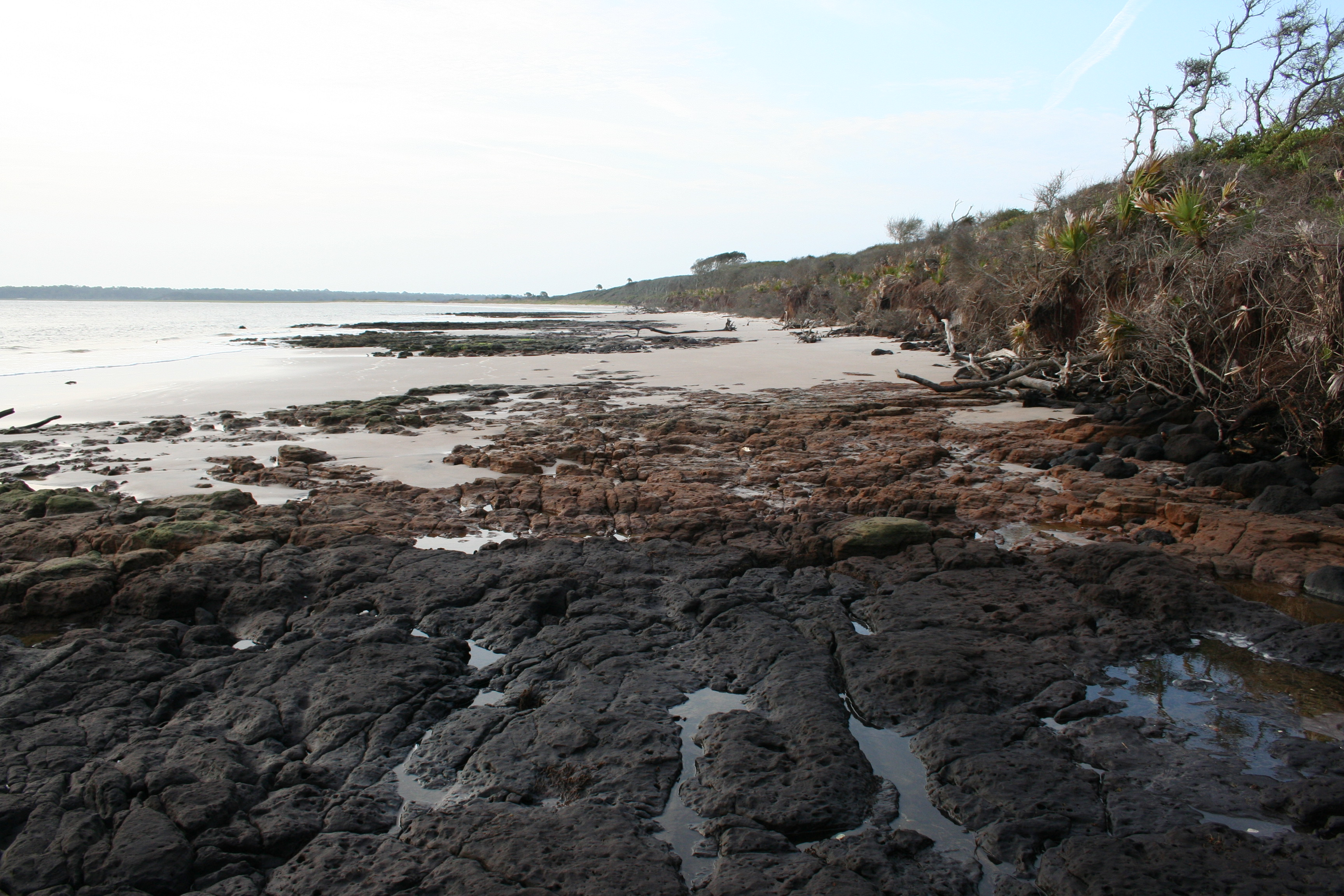
Blackrock Beach, Big Talbot Island

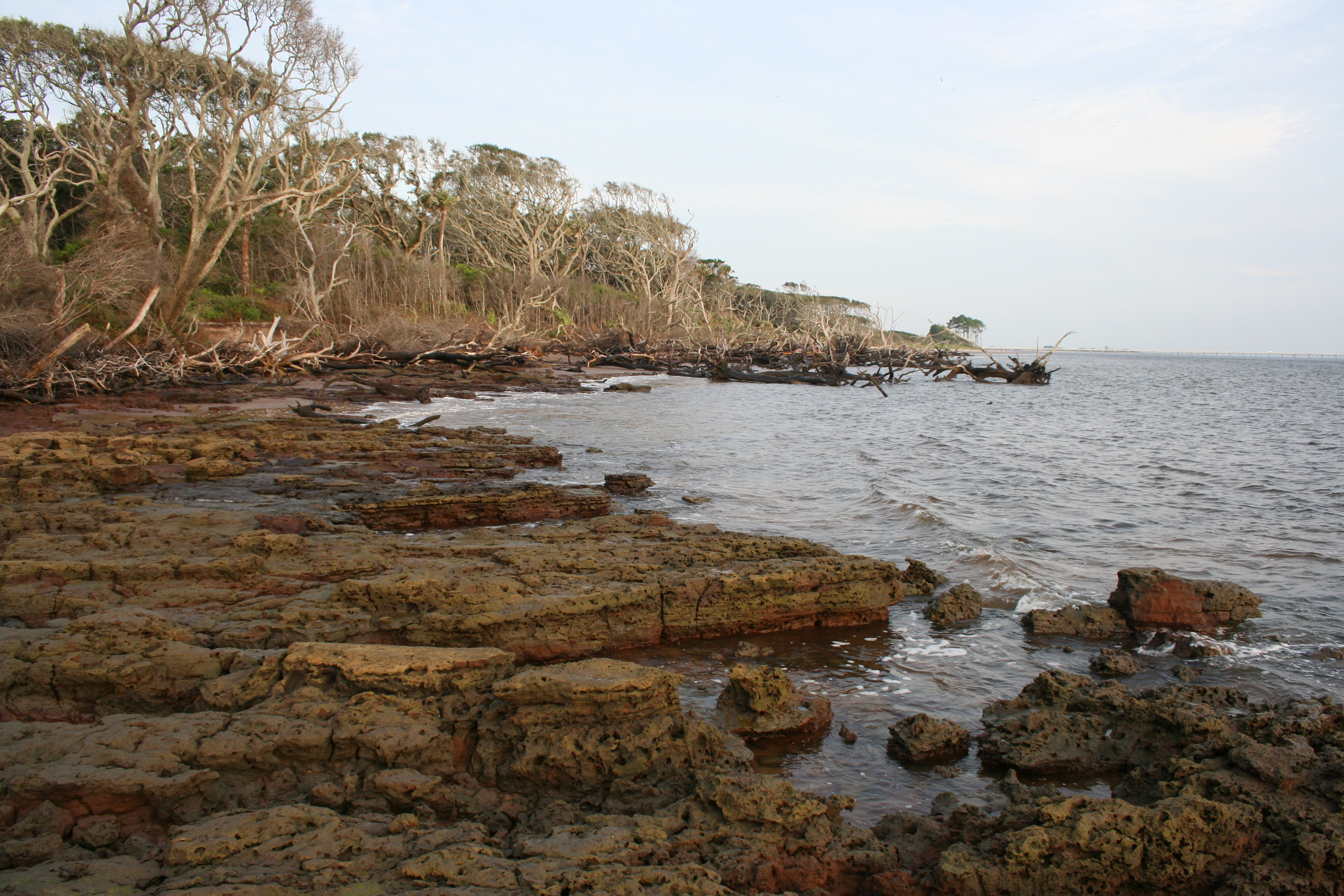
Unique hardpan formations, Blackrock Beach

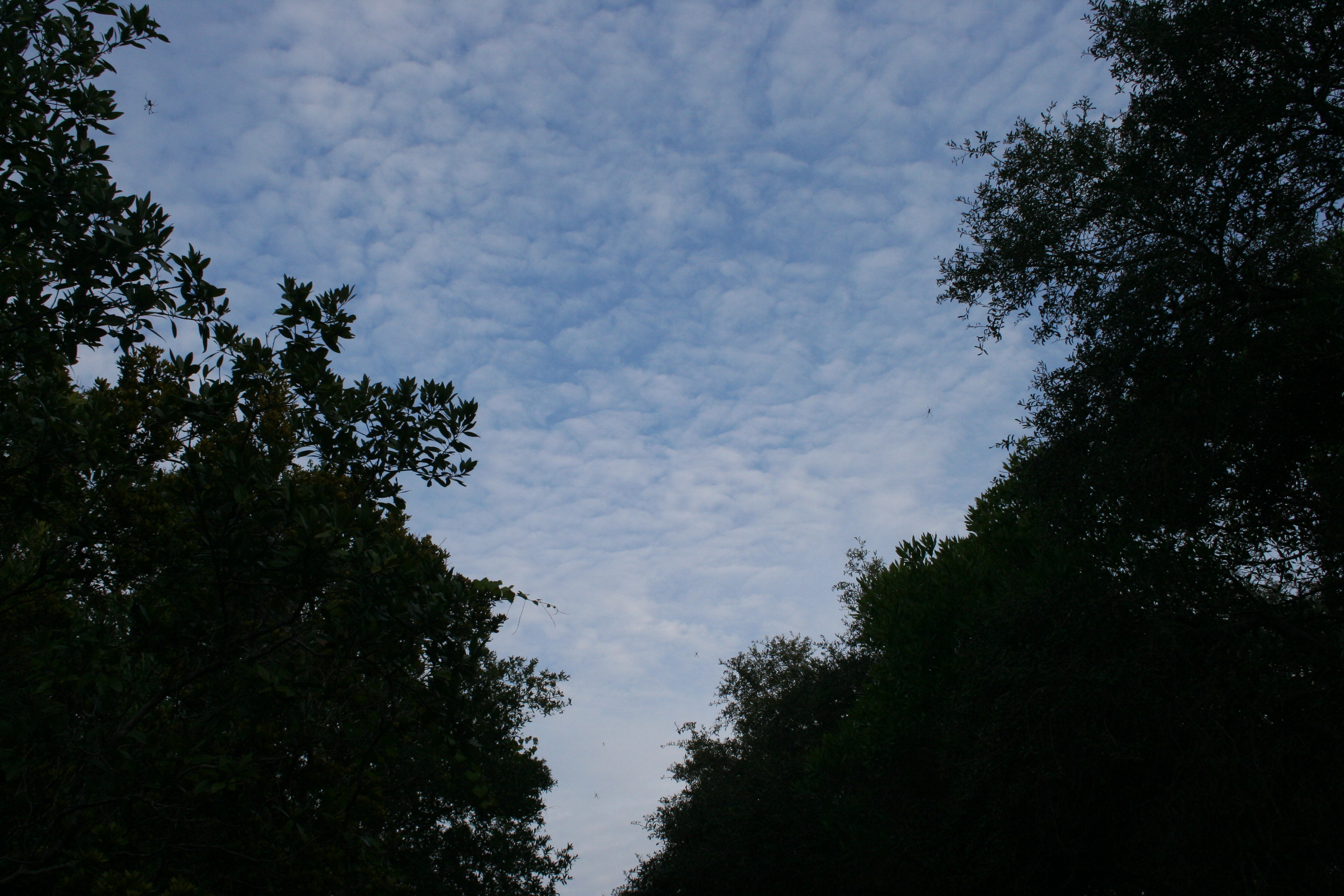
Spiders above the Blackrock Trail, Big Talbot Island

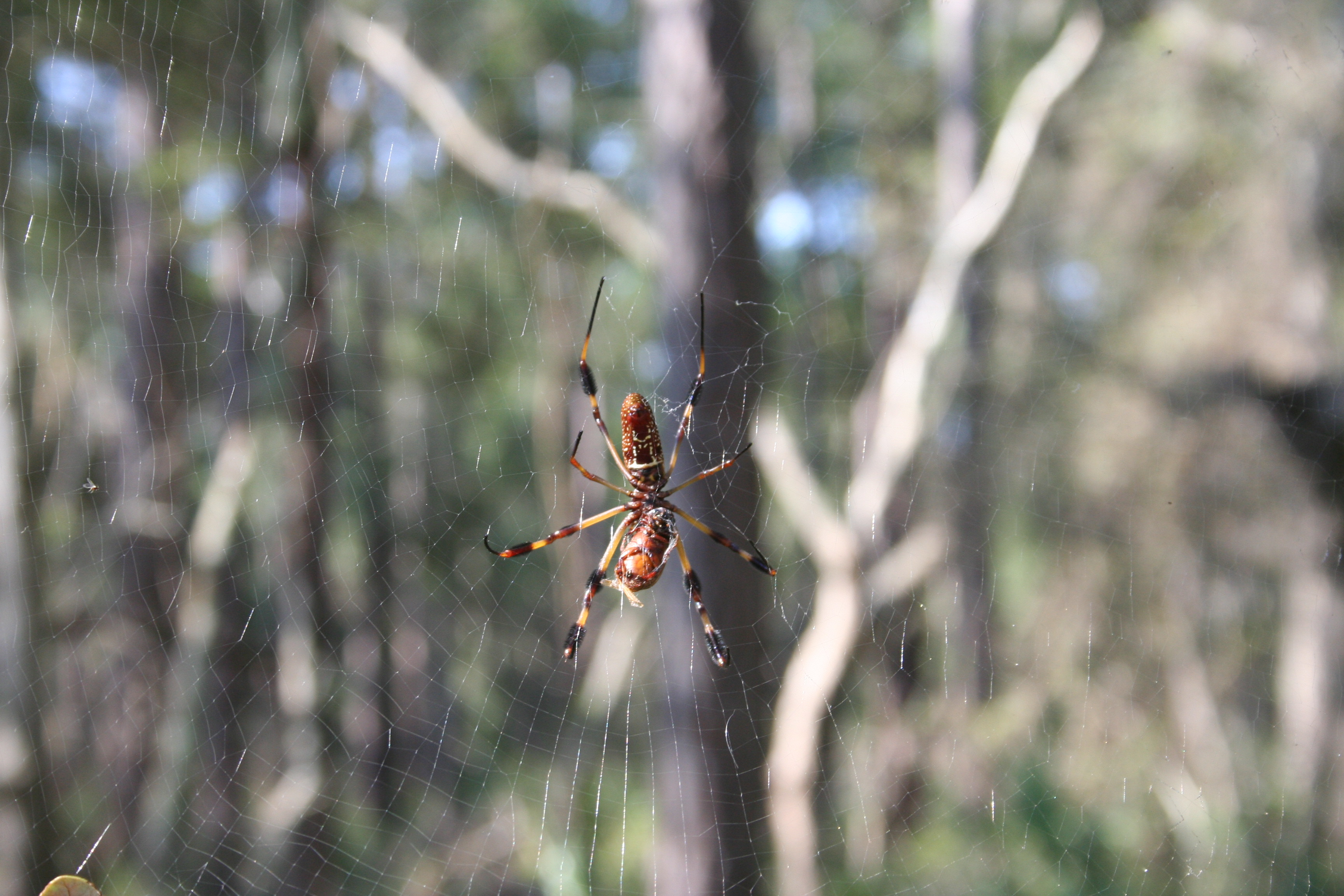
Golden silk orb-weaver, Big Talbot Island

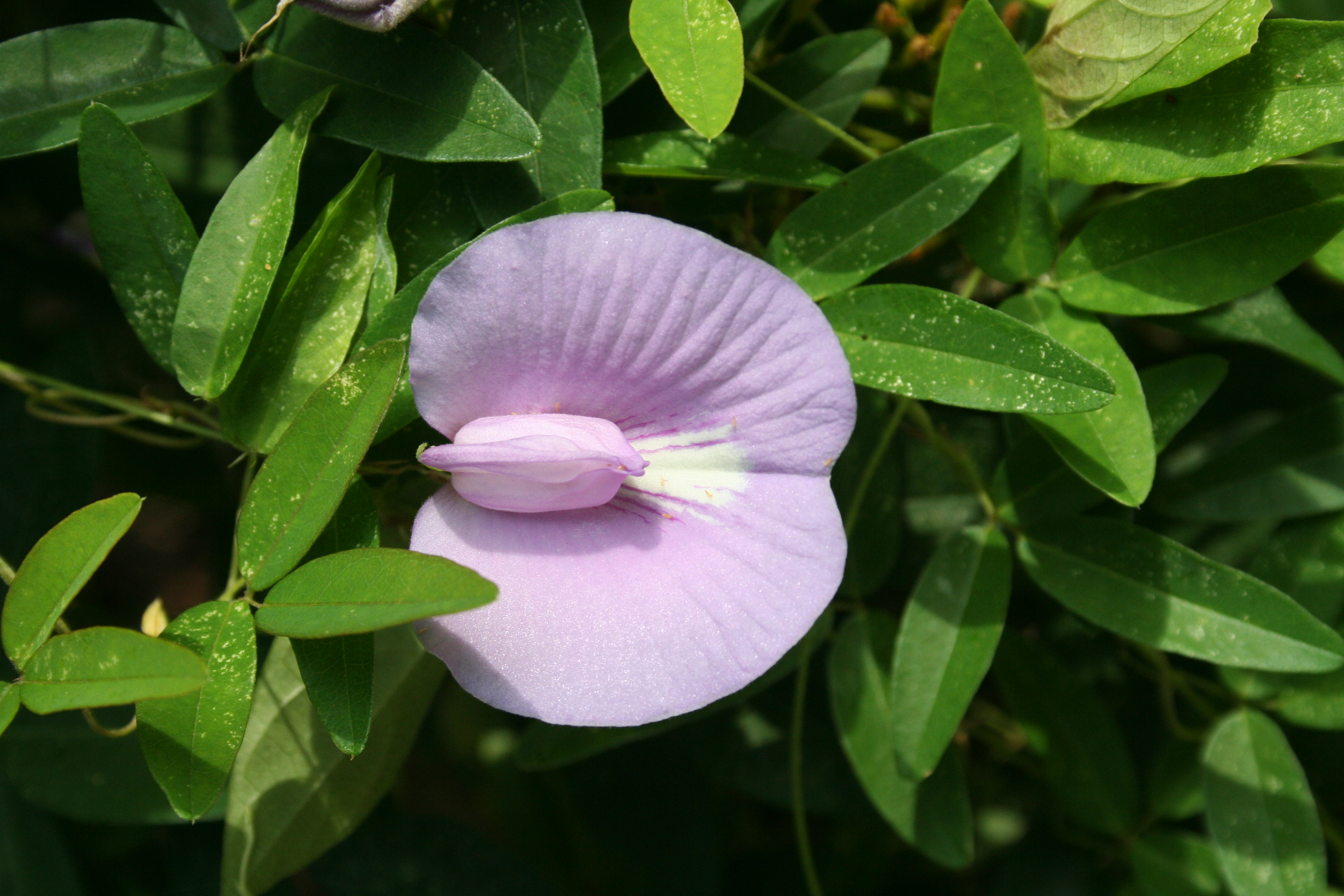
Spurred butterfly pea (Centrosema virginianum)

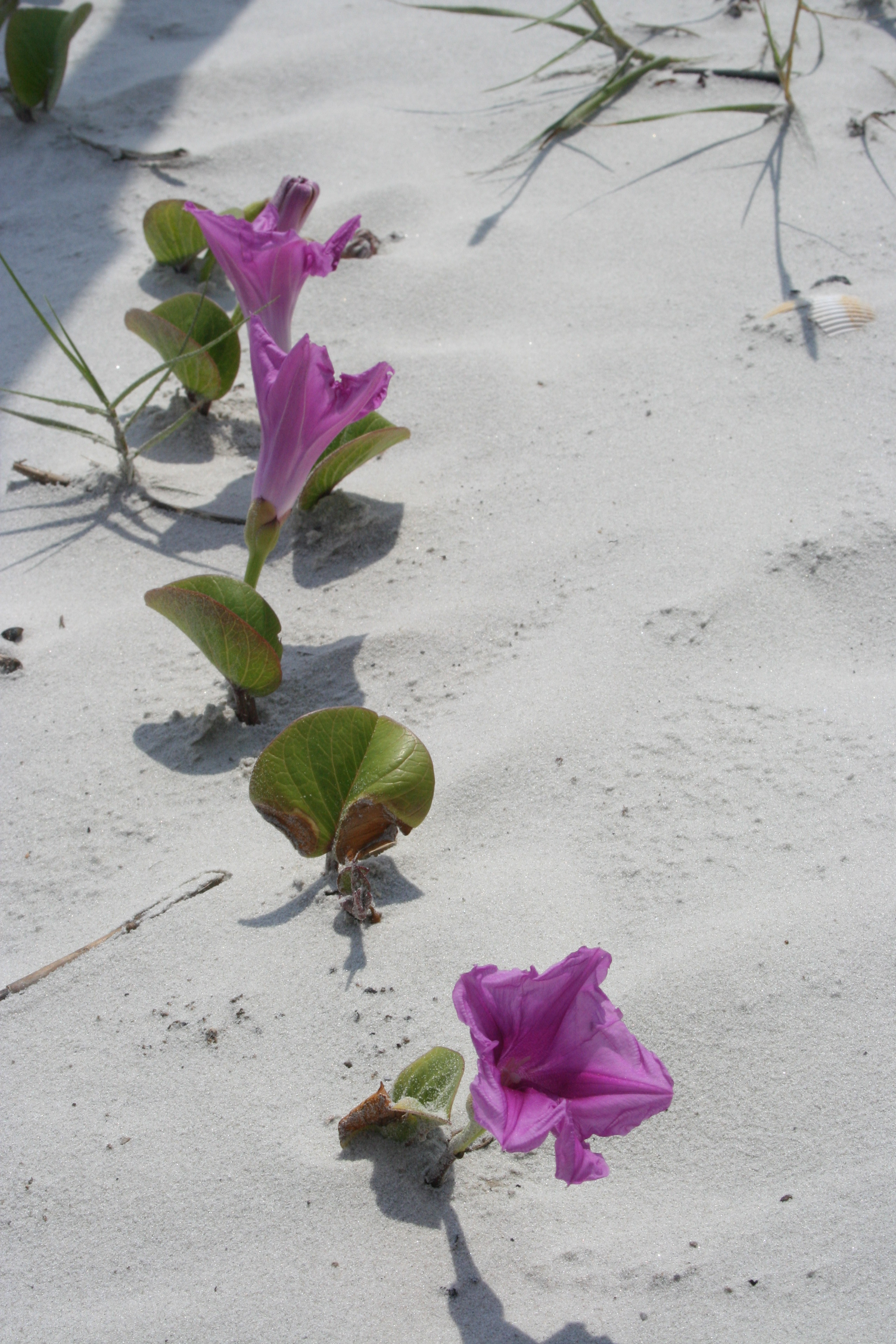
Beach morning glory, Big Talbot Island
