= Georgia's 151st House of Representatives district =

State district in Georgia, USA

Georgia's 151st State House of Representatives district
Representative
Mike Cheokas; R–Americus
- Demographics: 37.6% White; 56.3% Black; 4.3% Hispanic; 0.8% Asian
- Population: 51,679

District 151 elects one member of the Georgia House of Representatives. It contains the entirety of Chattahoochee County, Marion County, Schley County, Stewart County, Terrell County and Webster County, as well as parts of Dougherty County and Sumter County.

== Members ==
- Gerald Greene (2013–2023)
- Mike Cheokas (since 2023)
