= Rusty Kidd =

American politician (1946–2020)

Member of the Georgia House of Representatives from the 145th district
- In office December 2009 – January 9, 2017
- Preceded by: Bobby Parham
- Succeeded by: Rick Williams

Personal details
- Born: Edwards Culver Kidd III; May 10, 1946 Milledgeville, Georgia, U.S.
- Died: June 2, 2020 (aged 74) Macon, Georgia, U.S.
- Party: Independent
- Other political affiliations: Democratic
- Relations: Tillie Fowler (sister)
- Parents: Culver Kidd Jr.; Oma Katherine Rogers

Edwards Culver "Rusty" Kidd III (May 10, 1946 – June 2, 2020) was an American politician who was a member of the Georgia House of Representatives from 2009 to 2017.

== Background ==
Kidd was born in Milledgeville, Georgia and graduated from Baylor School in 1969. He received his bachelor's degree in finance from University of Tennessee in 1969. He was involved in the banking and the loan businesses.

== Career ==
He represented the 145th district, which includes Baldwin County and a small portion of Putnam County. During his tenure in the Georgia House of Representatives, Kidd was the sole elected independent. Kidd was a lobbyist and represented the Medical Association of Georgia and the R. J. Reynolds Tobacco Company, among others.

Kidd was a Democrat for 40 years before becoming an independent. He endorsed Republican primary candidate Herman Cain for president in 2012 and supported Donald Trump in 2016.

== Personal life ==
Kidd's father, Culver Kidd Jr., was a veteran state legislator in Georgia, and his sister, Tillie Fowler, served as a U.S. Representative for Florida's 4th congressional district from 1993 to 2001.

As a result of a motorcycle accident in 1999, Kidd was paralyzed from the chest down and used a motorized wheelchair to transport himself.

Kidd chose not to seek reelection in 2016. He died at a hospital in Macon, Georgia on June 2, 2020, at age 74.
