= Mike Cheokas =

American politician from Georgia

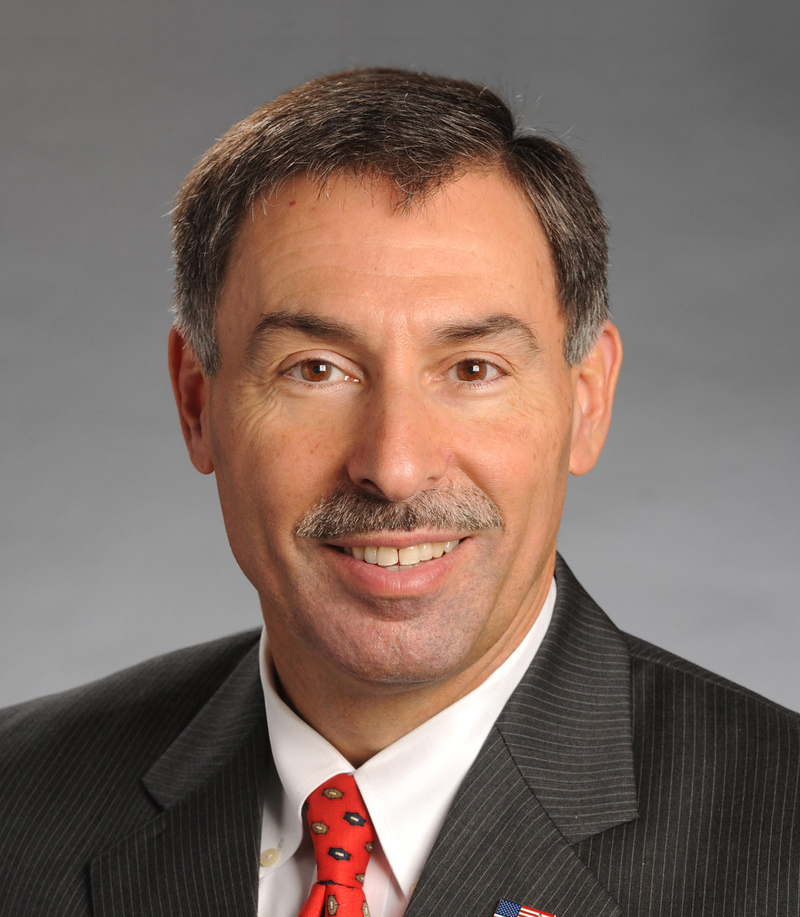
- Official headshot

Member of the Georgia House of Representatives
- Incumbent
- Assumed office January 14, 2019
- Preceded by: Bill McGowan
- Constituency: 138th District (2019–2023); 151st District (2023–Present)
- In office January 10, 2005 – January 9, 2017
- Preceded by: Gerald Greene
- Succeeded by: Bill McGowan
- Constituency: 134th District (2005–2013); 138th District (2013–2017)

Personal details
- Born: May 27, 1953 (age 73) Americus, Georgia, U.S.
- Party: Democratic (before 2010); Republican (2010–present)
- Occupation: Politician

Michael A. Cheokas (born May 27, 1953) is an American politician from Georgia.

== Education ==
Cheokas earned a degree from Emory University and Pierce College.

== Career ==
Cheokas is a Republican member of the Georgia House of Representatives from the 138th District. He was first elected in 2004 and served until losing reelection in 2016 to Democrat Bill McGowan. McGowan did not seek a second term in 2018, but Cheokas ran again and won, defeating Bardin Hooks.

== Personal life ==
Cheokas' wife is Gaynor Cheokas. They have three children. Cheokas and his family live in Americus, Georgia.

Georgia House of Representatives
Preceded by Gerald Greene	Member of the Georgia House of Representatives from the 134th district 2005–2013	Succeeded by Richard Smith
Preceded by Nikki Randall	Member of the Georgia House of Representatives from the 138th district 2013–2017	Succeeded by Bill McGowan
Preceded by Bill McGowan	Member of the Georgia House of Representatives from the 138th district 2019–2023	Succeeded by Vance Smith
Preceded by Gerald Greene	Member of the Georgia House of Representatives from the 151st district 2023–Present	Incumbent
