= Culver Kidd Jr. =

American politician (1914–1995)

Member of the Georgia State Senate from the 25th district
- In office January 14, 1963 – January 11, 1993
- Preceded by: Floyd Harrington
- Succeeded by: Wilbur Baugh

Member of the Georgia House of Representatives from Baldwin County
- In office January 14, 1957 – January 14, 1963
- Preceded by: W. C. Massee
- Succeeded by: Floyd Harrington
- In office January 13, 1947 – January 12, 1953
- Preceded by: Marion Ennis
- Succeeded by: Robert H. Green

Personal details
- Born: Edwards Culver Kidd Jr. July 17, 1914 Milledgeville, Georgia, U.S.
- Died: December 4, 1995 (aged 81)
- Party: Democratic
- Spouse: Oma Katherine Rogers (m. 1941)
- Children: 4, including Tillie Fowler and Rusty Kidd
- Education: Georgia Tech (BS)
- Occupation: Businessman; politician

Military service
- Branch/service: United States Army; Army Ground Forces
- Rank: Major
- Battles/wars: World War II; Battle of Okinawa
- Awards: Purple Heart

Edwards Culver Kidd Jr. (July 17, 1914 – December 4, 1995) was an American politician.

== Biography ==
Kidd was born in Milledgeville, Georgia. He went to Georgia Military College and graduated from Georgia Institute of Technology.

He served in the United States Army during World War II and was commissioned a major. Kidd was the owner of a drug store and was the president of a small loans company in Milledegeville, Georgia.

He served in the Georgia House of Representatives from 1947 to 1953 and from 1957 to 1963. Kidd served on the Baldwin County, Georgia commission from 1955 to 1964 and in the Georgia State Senate from 1962 to 1992 and was a Democrat. Kidd acquired the nickname “the Silver Fox” as a tribute both to his silver hair and his political cunning.

His son Rusty Kidd also served in the Georgia General Assembly and his daughter Tillie Fowler served in the United States House of Representatives from Florida.
