= Rick Williams (Georgia politician) =

American politician (born 1952)

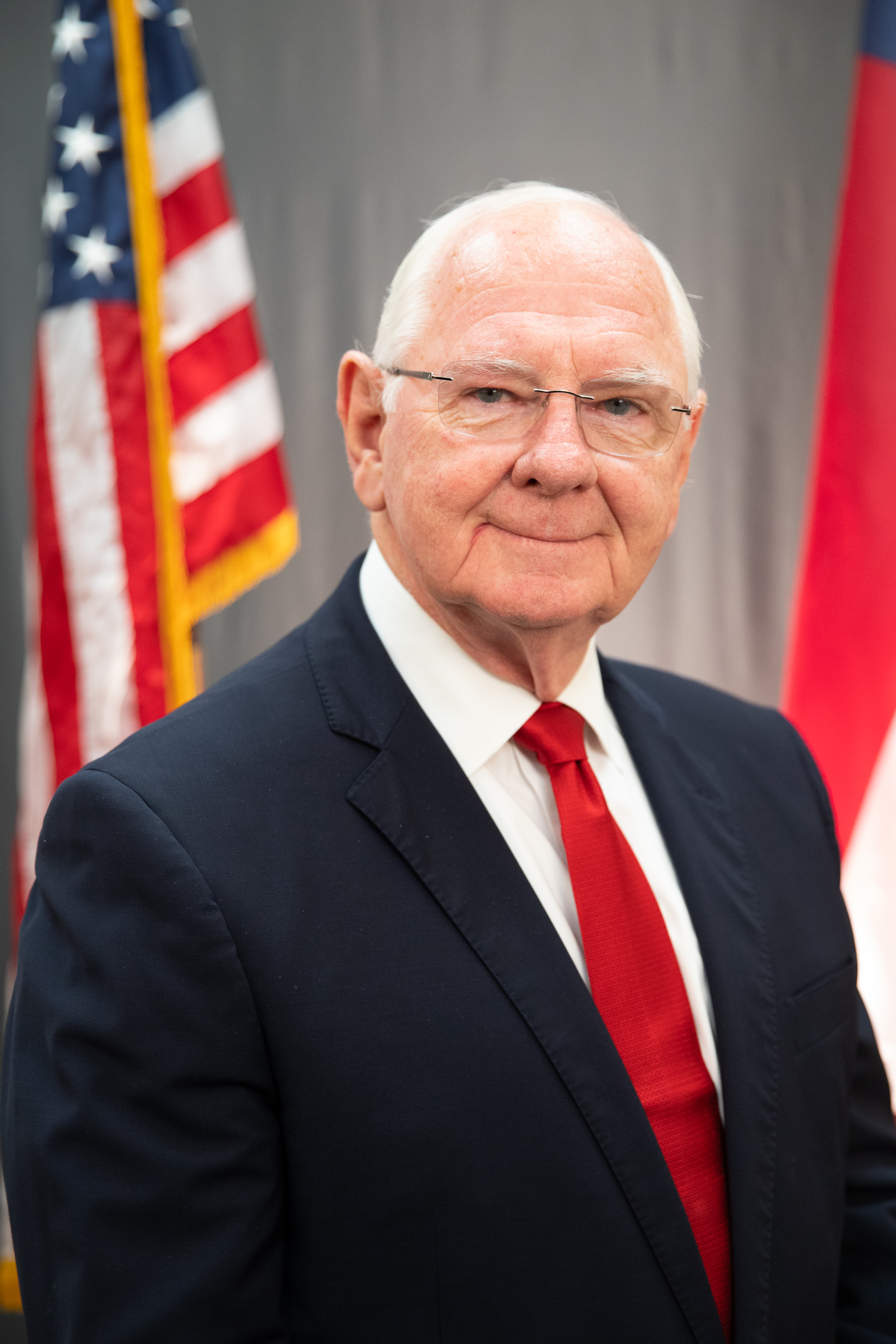
- Official portrait, 2022

Member of the Georgia State Senate from the 25th district
- Incumbent
- Assumed office January 9, 2023
- Preceded by: Burt Jones

Member of the Georgia House of Representatives from the 145th district
- In office January 9, 2017 – January 9, 2023
- Preceded by: Rusty Kidd
- Succeeded by: Kenneth Vance (Redistricting)

Personal details
- Born: Ricky Alvin Williams; September 24, 1952 (age 73)
- Party: Republican
- Spouse: Donna Williams
- Children: 3
- Occupation: Funeral homes co-owner, cemetery co-owner, politician
- Other names: Ricky Williams, Ricky A. Williams

Ricky Alvin Williams (born September 24, 1952) is an American politician currently serving as a member of the Georgia Senate since 2023. Williams previously served as a Republican member of the Georgia House of Representatives from 2017 to 2023.

== Education ==
Williams attended Gupton-Jones College of Funeral Service.

== Career ==
Williams was a former co-owner of a funeral home and cemetery.

On November 8, 2016, Williams won an election to become a member of the Georgia House of Representatives for District 145. William defeated St. Sen. Floyd Griffin with 56.57% of the votes. He succeeded Independent Rusty Kidd. Williams took office on January 9, 2017. At the time, District 145 covered all of Baldwin County, and a significant portion of Putnam County.

On November 6, 2018, as an incumbent, Williams won re-election unopposed and continued serving District 145. On November 3, 2020, as an incumbent, Williams won his third term, defeating Quentin Howell with 56.16% of the vote.

In December 2021, Williams announced he would run for the Georgia State Senate District 25 seat to replace Burt Jones who ran for Lieutenant Governor of Georgia.

In January 2024, Williams co-sponsored S.B. 390, which would withhold government funding for any libraries in Georgia affiliated with the American Library Association.

Currently, Georgia State Senate District 25 covers all of: Baldwin County, Butts County, Jasper County, Jones County, Putnam County, and portions of Bibb County and Henry County.

== Personal life ==
Williams' wife is Donna Williams. They have three children.

Georgia House of Representatives
Preceded by Rusty Kidd	Member of the Georgia House of Representatives from the 145th district 2017–2023	Succeeded by Robert Dickey
Georgia State Senate
Preceded by Burt Jones	Member of the Georgia Senate from the 25th district 2023–Present	Incumbent
