= Machaba Balu Preserve =

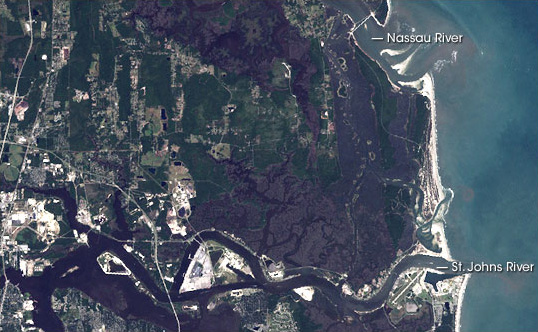
- Satellite image of Machaba Balu Preserve

- Location within Florida Location within the United States
- Location: Duval County, Florida, United States
- Coordinates: 30°27′07″N 81°46′04″W
- Area: 10,000 sq mi (26,000 km^{2})
- Established: 2002
- Named for: Machaba Balu is a modern construct of the Timucua language.
- Website: Machaba Balu Preserve at The Nature Conservancy

The Machaba Balu Preserve is a nature preserve encompassing 10,000 acres (4,000 ha) of protected lands in northeastern Florida, just to the northeast of Jacksonville, at the confluence of the Nassau, the St. Marys, and the St. Johns Rivers as they flow toward the Atlantic Ocean through a wide network of islands, canals, and tidal marshes. The name Machaba Balu means "saved marsh" in the language of the Timucua people, who occupied the area in pre-Columbian times and met the first European explorers of the region; the Timucua never used this name themselves, however, as it is a modern language construct. The preserve, created with land purchased in 2002 mostly from Alcoma Corporation by the Nature Conservancy, includes 77 islands and numerous individual tracts of tidal marshland between the Nassau and the St. Johns Rivers. The largest clusters lie to the west of Little Talbot Island State Park and on either side of Sisters Creek south of the large fork.

The Nature Conservancy chose to preserve these lands as a region of significant biodiversity that supports an important fish hatchery and spawning area for commercial and recreational fishing in Florida; its estuaries and tidal creeks provide habitat for manatees, dolphins, sea turtles and terrapins; numerous species of shorebirds and wading birds feed and nest there as well, some listed as threatened or as species of special concern. Hammocks of higher ground rise above the floodplain, with forests inhabited by rare species of plants and animals, including the Florida black bear and the red-cockaded woodpecker; bald eagles and ospreys are found in their stands of hardwood trees, and painted buntings in the underbrush. The entire ecosystem is vulnerable to pollution caused by surrounding coastal development.
