= Kenneth Vance =

American politician

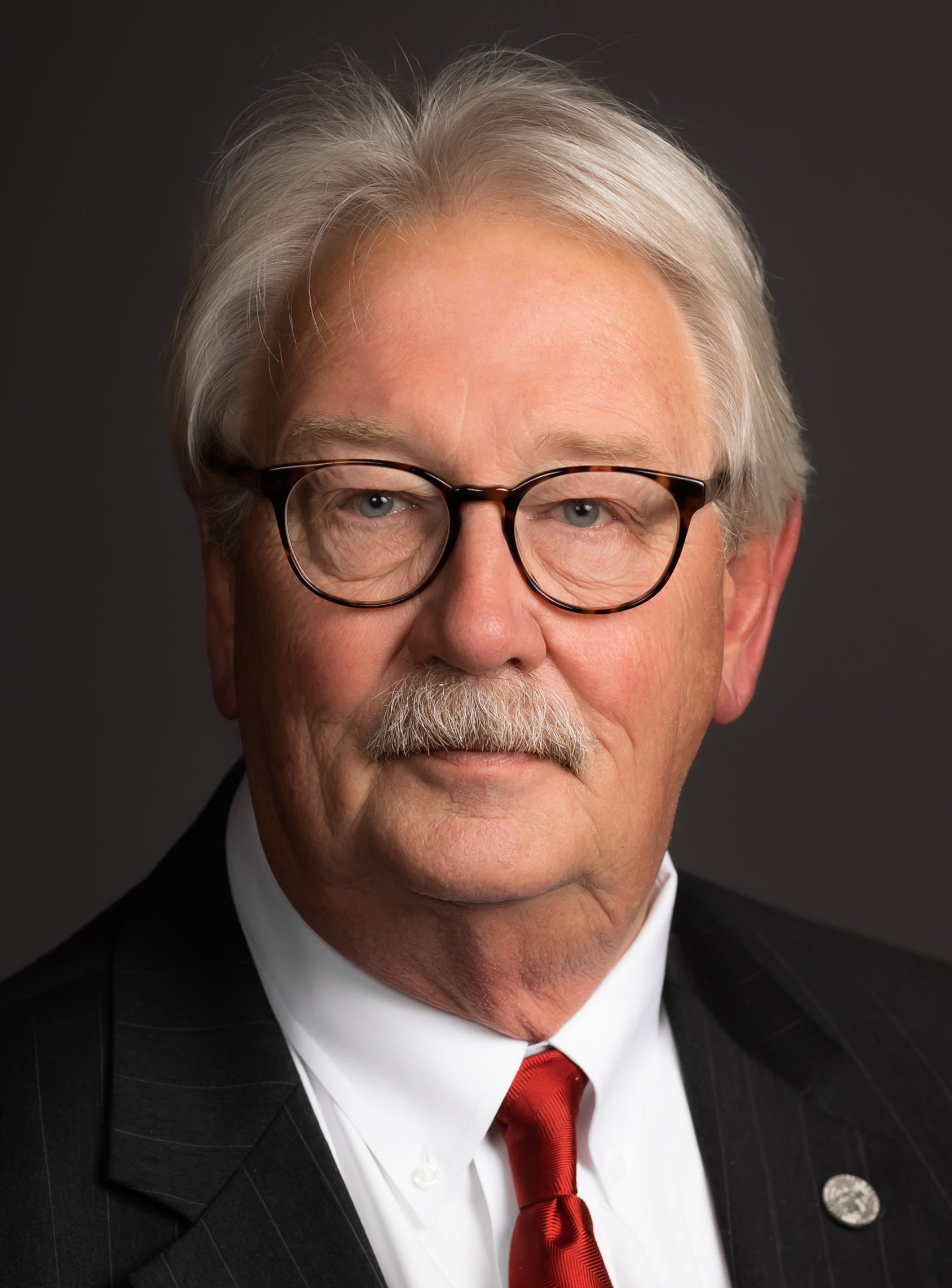

Member of the Georgia House of Representatives from the 133rd district
- In office January 9, 2023 – January 13, 2025
- Preceded by: Rick Williams (redistricting)
- Succeeded by: Floyd Griffin (redistricting)

Personal details
- Party: Republican

Kenneth Austin Vance is an American politician who served as a member of the Georgia House of Representatives from the 133rd district frin 2023 to 2025. Elected in 2022, he was defeated by Democrat Floyd Griffin in 2024 when he ran in the redistricted 149th district.
