= Georgia's 25th Senate district =

State district of Georgia, US

Georgia's 25th State Senate district
Senator
Rick Williams; R–Milledgeville
- Demographics: 60.69% White; 30.55% Black; 4.05% Hispanic; 0.93% Asian; 0.17% Native American; 0.04% Hawaiian/Pacific Islander; 0.41% Other; 4.06% Multiracial
- Population (2020) • Voting age: 189,469; 147,337

District 25 of the Georgia Senate is located in Middle Georgia and parts of southeastern Metro Atlanta and the Macon metropolitan area. It also includes the former state capital of Milledgeville.

The district includes all of Baldwin, Butts, southern Henry, Jasper, Jones, northern Macon-Bibb, and Putnam counties. In Henry County, the district includes much of the Locust Grove area. In Macon, it includes the Heritage Acres and Wimbish Woods neighborhoods.

The current senator is Rick Williams, a Republican from Milledgeville first elected in 2022.
