= Little Talbot Island State Park =

State park in Florida, United States

- IUCN category Ib (wilderness area)
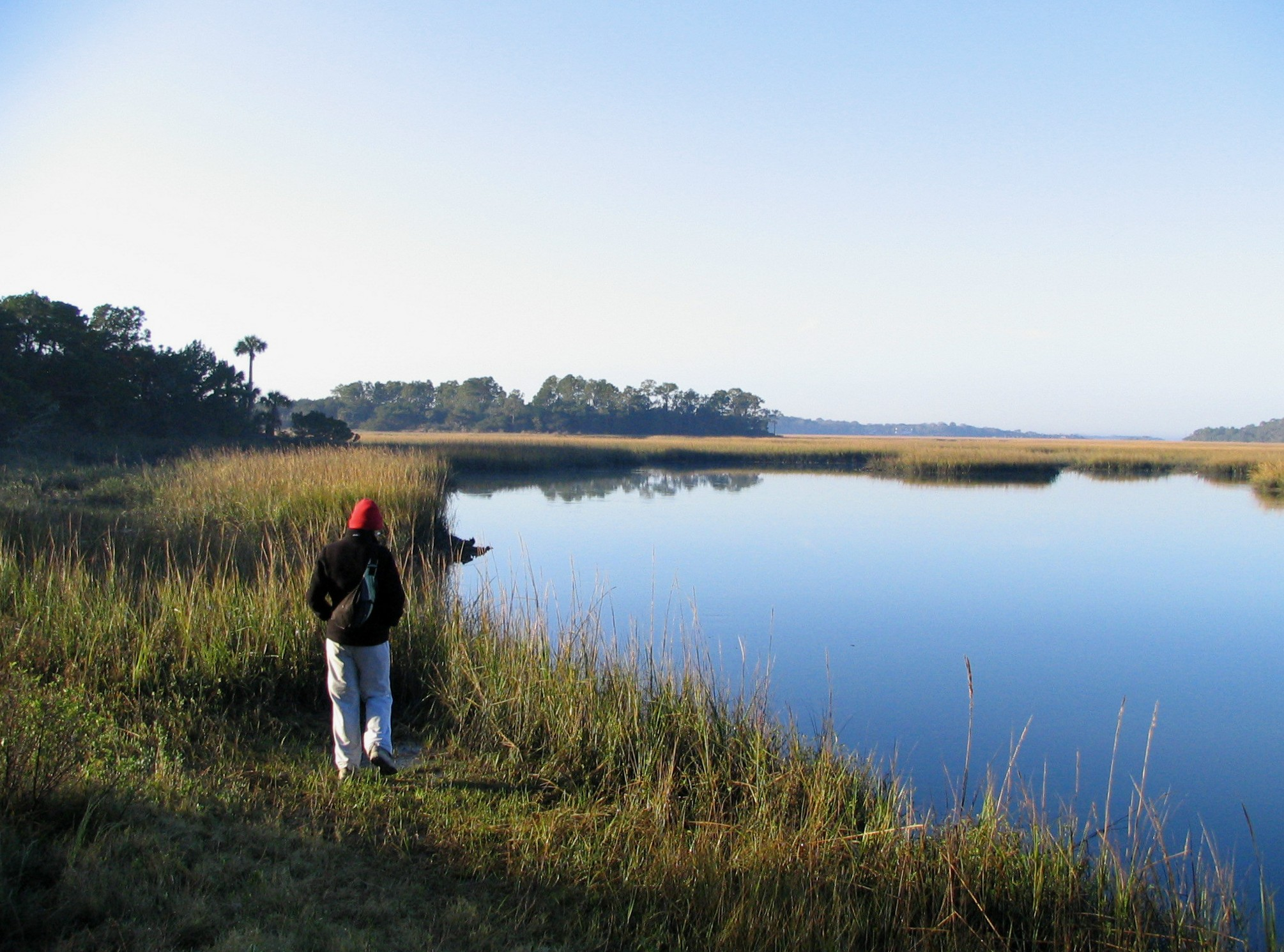
- Myrtle Creek on Little Talbot Island State Park

- Location within Florida Location within the United States
- Interactive map of Little Talbot Island State Park
- Location: Jacksonville, Florida, Duval County, Florida, United States
- Coordinates: 30°27′07″N 81°25′08″W
- Area: 2,500 acres (10 km^{2})
- Established: 1951
- Named for: Charles Baron Talbot, Lord High Chancellor of England
- Governing body: Florida Department of Environmental Protection
- Website: Official website at Florida State Parks

Little Talbot Island State Park is a Florida State Park located on Little Talbot Island, 17 miles (27 km) northeast of Jacksonville on State Road A1A. The park covers the entire 2,500-acre (10 km^{2}) island. Big Talbot Island State Park lies to the immediate north. The park contains maritime forests, dunes, and salt marshes on the western side of the island. Wild life includes river otters, marsh rabbits, bobcats, and a variety of native and migrating birds. Activities include camping, fishing, hiking, swimming, canoeing, nature watching and surfing. Erosion on Big Talbot Island, coupled with sand deposition on Little Talbot, have resulted in Little Talbot Island becoming the larger of the two Talbot Islands. The largest continuous section of the Machaba Balu Preserve lies just to the west of Little Talbot Island.

Amenities include a full–facility campground, as well as a youth/group tent campground and beachside picnic pavilions. The park also has bath houses, a small boat ramp, a nature trail, and a playground. Bicycles and canoes can be rented at the campground. The park is open from 8:00 am till dark.

== Gallery ==
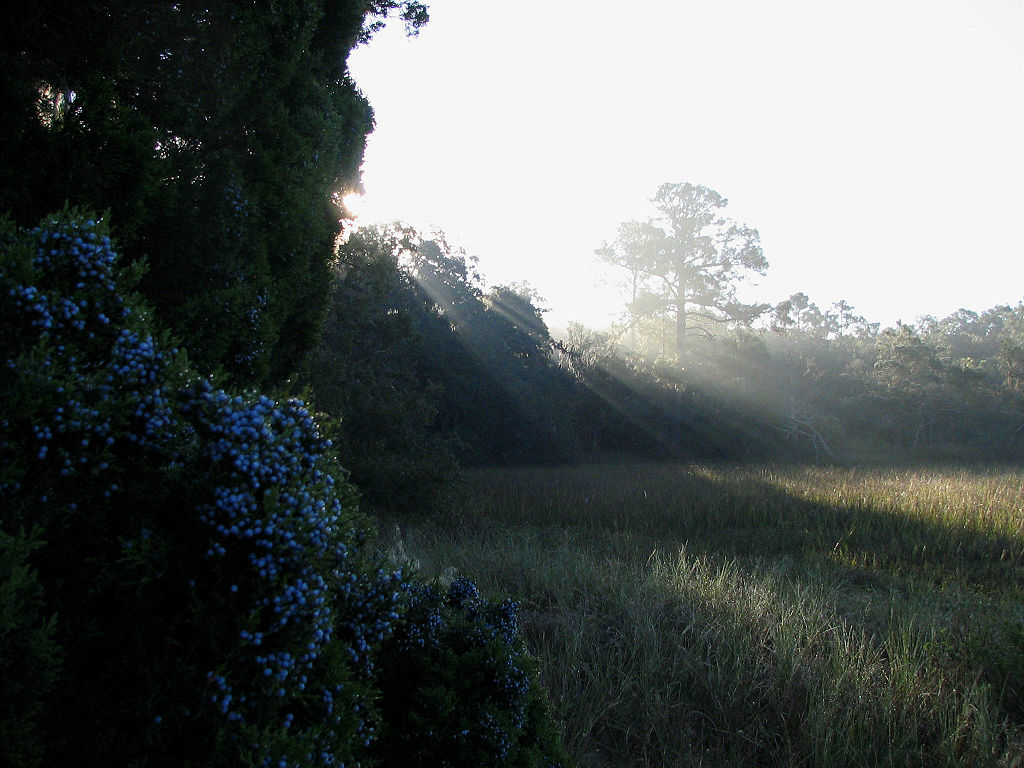
Little Talbot Island - eastern red cedar

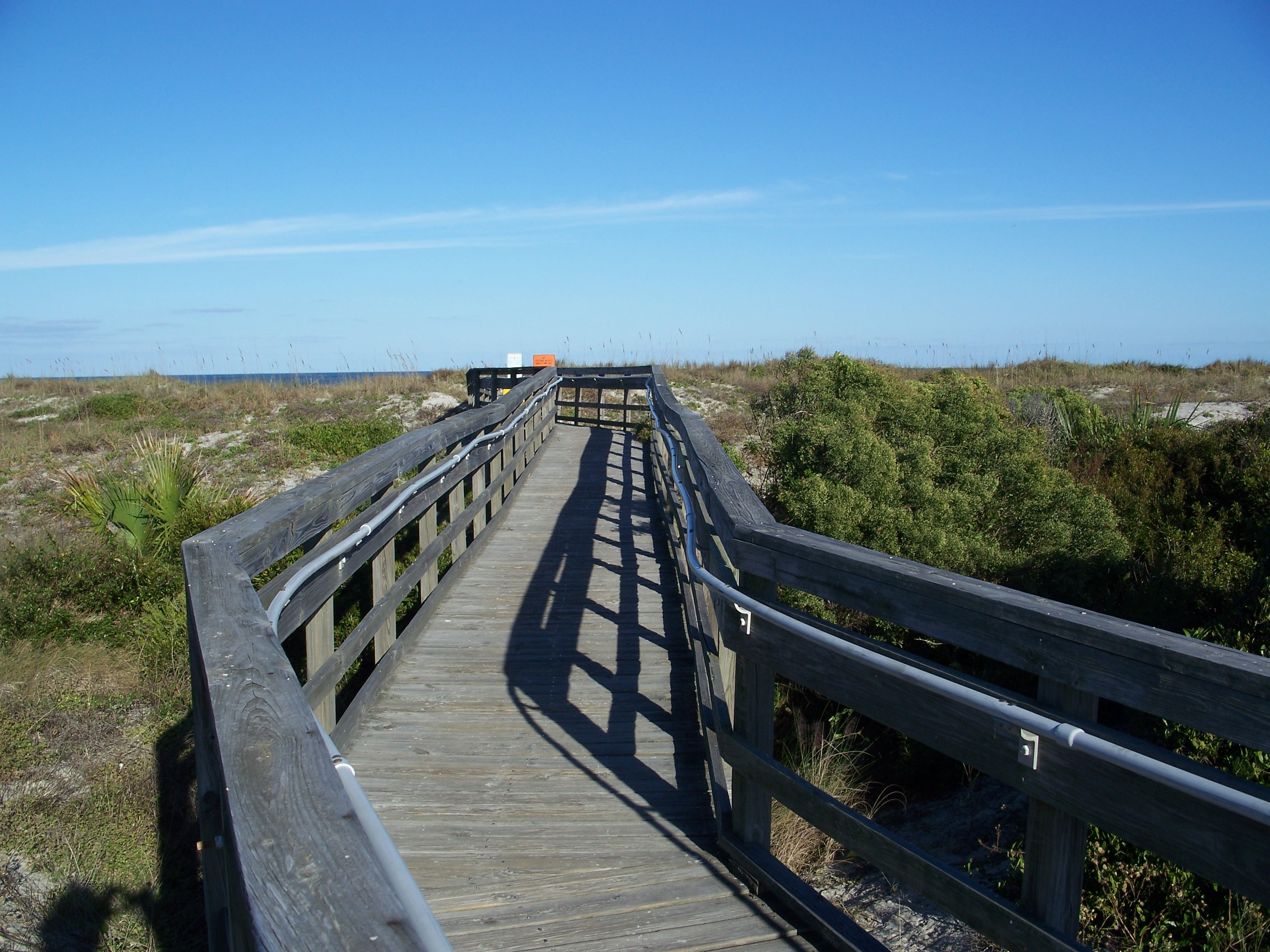
Boardwalk to beach

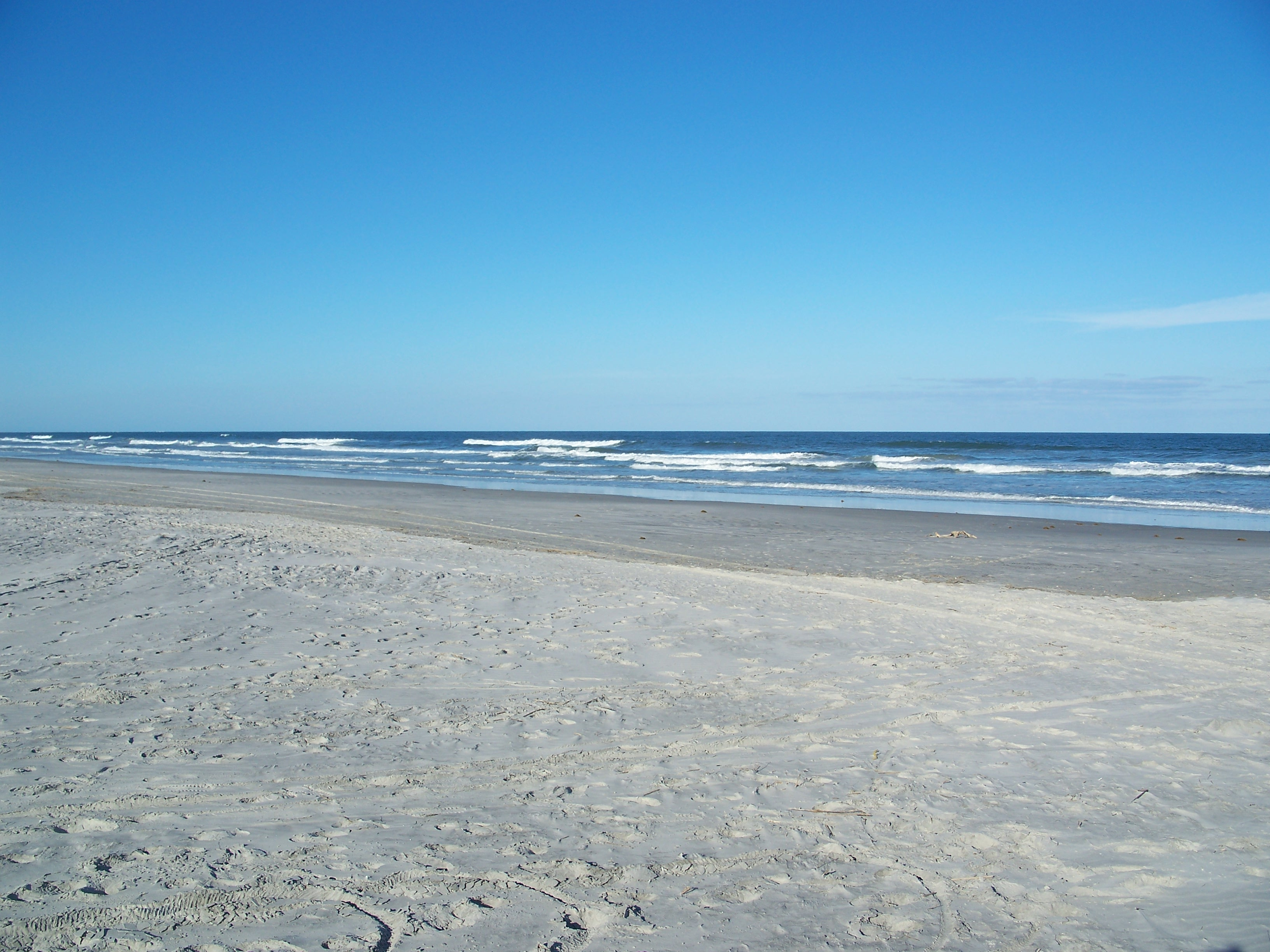
Beach

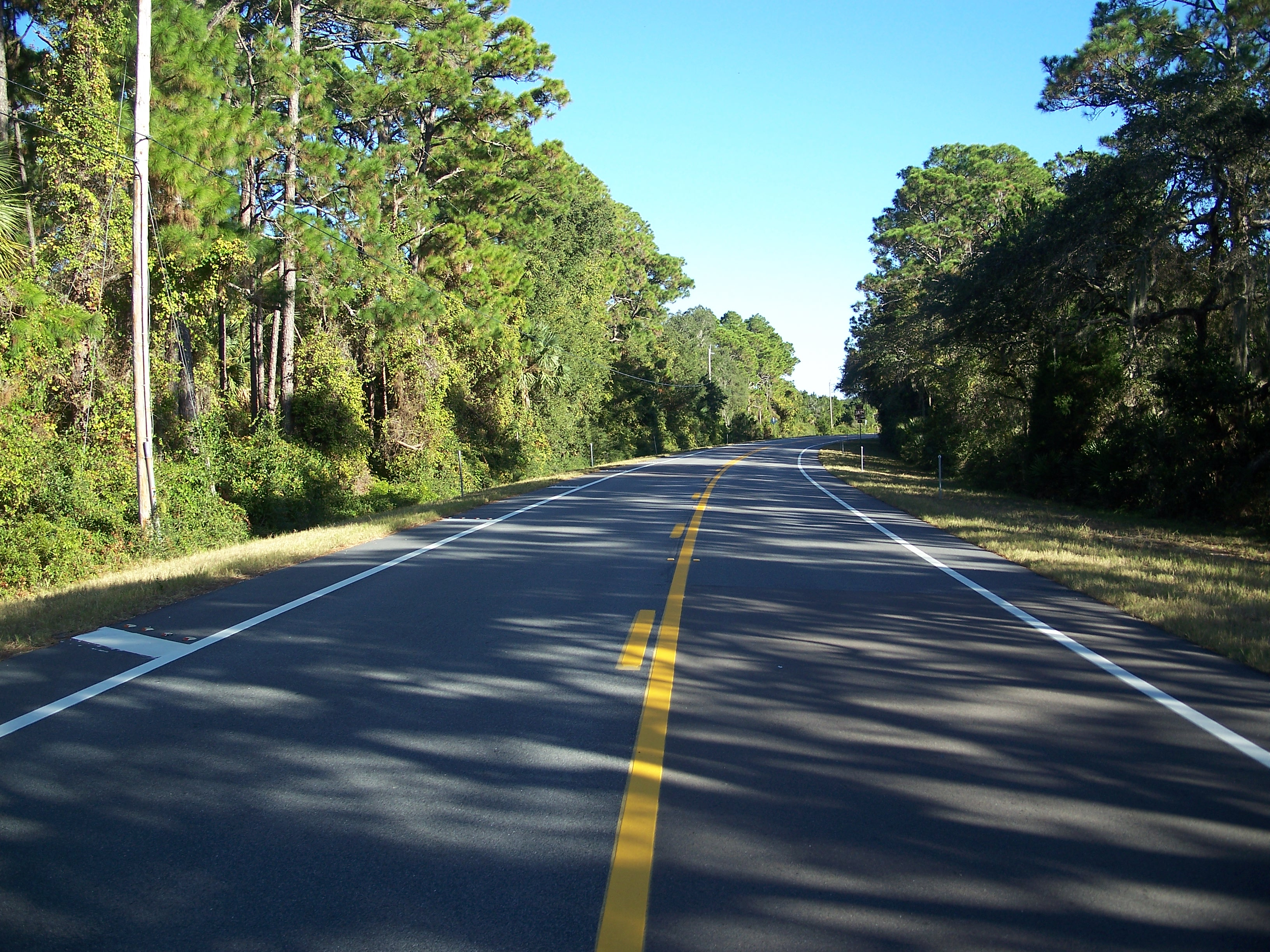
A1A, looking south
