= List of urban parks by size =

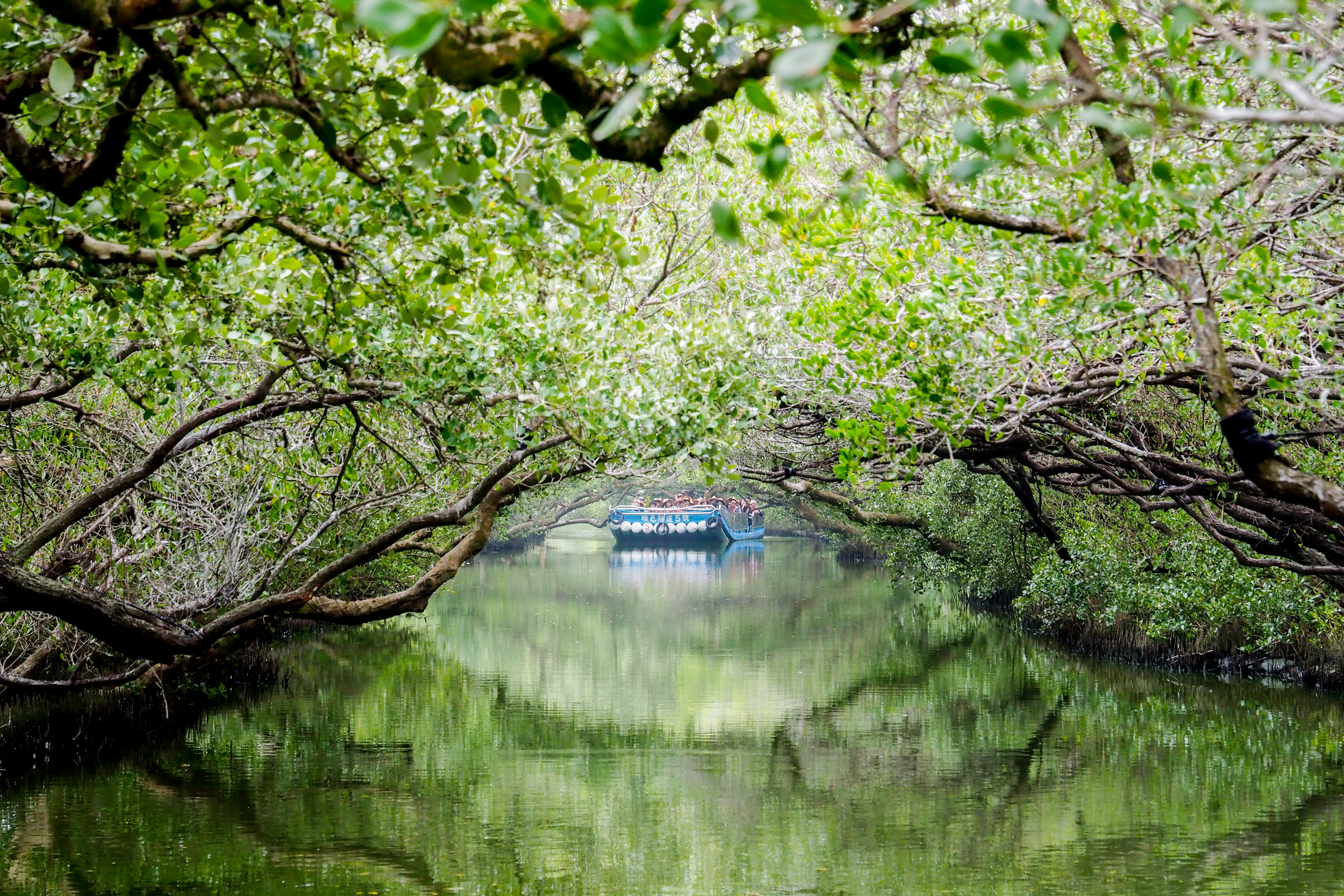
A tunnel of mangroves in Taijiang National Park, Taiwan.

This list of urban parks by size includes parks at least 404.7 hectares (1,000 acres) or 4 square kilometres (1.5 sq mi) and contained entirely within a locality's municipal or metropolitan boundary.

== List ==
This is a list of the largest parks located entirely within a metropolitan area. Park systems are included, but not ranked because park systems are networks that contain multiple parks. Not all parks listed below are classified as urban parks by their managing authority.

Ranking	Name	City/Metropolitan area	Country	Managing authority	Size in acres	Size in hectares	Description
1	Taijiang National Park	Tainan	Taiwan	Ministry of the Interior	97,112.4	39,300.0	One of nine national parks in Taiwan. Around seven-eighths of the park is water.
2	Gatineau Park	Gatineau	Canada	National Capital Commission	89,205.0	36,100.0	Situated in the Outaouais region north of the Canadian capital of Ottawa in the National Capital Region. It is not classified as an urban park by its managing authority.
3	Forest of Fontainebleau	Ile-de-France/Greater Paris Metro Area	France	National Office for Forests (ONF)	61,776.3	25,000.0	Originally a royal hunting domain around Fontainebleau Palace (a former lodge) in its midst, the forest is located south-east of Paris suburbs. It is the largest reserved natural area in Ile-de-France, and claims to be the first nature reserve in the world (converted to in 1861–1892).
4	Table Mountain National Park	Cape Town	South Africa	South African National Parks	54,610.3	22,100.0	Established in 1998, this national park situated around the Table Mountain chain, forms a part of the Cape Floristic Region World Heritage Site. It supports a diverse set of flora, including a number of rare and endemic species.
5	Forest of Rambouillet	Ile-de-France/Greater Paris Metro Area	France	National Office for Forests (ONF)	54,363.2	22,000.0	With the town of Rambouillet at its centre; in the south-west of Ile-de-France, approximately 25 km south-west of Versailles. The eponymous modest chateau was less a royal residence and more a hunting lodge for the vast surrounding forests.
6	Margalla Hills National Park	Islamabad	Pakistan	Margalla Hills National Park Authority	42,961.7	17,386.0	It was established in 1980 as the third largest urban park in the world and the largest in Asia. The park includes the Margalla Hills, which forms the foothills of the Himalayas.
7	Pedra Branca State Park	Rio de Janeiro	Brazil	Rio de Janeiro State Forestry Institute	30,626.2	12,394.0	Established in 1974, the state park protects an area of Atlantic Forest. Waterways within the park provides water to several dams in the city.
8	McDowell Sonoran Preserve	Scottsdale	United States	City of Scottsdale Parks & Recreation	30,394.0	12,300.0	The preserve is a large permanently protected, sustainable desert habitat.
9	Losiny Ostrov National Park	Moscow	Russia	Russian Ministry of Natural Resources and Environment	28,664.2	11,600.0	Established in 1983, Losiny Ostrov National Park is Russia's first national park. The park is located on the Meshchera Lowlands.
10	Yangmingshan National Park	Taipei	Taiwan	Ministry of the Interior	28,016.8	11,338.0	Established in 1985, Yangmingshan National Park is Taiwan's third national park. The park is located in Greater Taipei.
11	Franklin Mountains State Park	El Paso	United States	Texas Parks and Wildlife Department	24,246.0	9,812.0	Largest state park in the United States completely within a city's limits. Located at the Rocky Mountains's most southerly point in the state.
12	Bayou Sauvage National Wildlife Refuge	New Orleans	United States	United States Fish and Wildlife Service	22,758.4	9,210.0	The wildlife preserve was established in 1990. Consisting of fresh and brackish marshes, it is the largest urban wildlife refuge in the United States.
13	Bukhansan National Park	Seoul	South Korea	Korea National Park Service	19,748.7	7,992.0	Established in 1983, the park contains forested areas, temples, and granite peaks. The Bukhansanseong Fortress is situated within the park, together with its defensive walls.
14	Cantareira State Park	São Paulo	Brazil	Fundação Florestal	19,562.1	7,916.52	Established in 1962, it is the largest urban green area in the country (64,800 hectares). In October 1994, UNESCO declared it part of the São Paulo City Green Belt Biosphere Reserve.
15	Rouge National Urban Park	Toronto	Canada	Parks Canada	18,532.9	7,500.0	Canada's first national urban park, it is the second largest parkland in Canada. In total, 7,910 hectares (19,500 acres) of land has been committed to the park, although only 95% of the land committed has been transferred to Parks Canada as of 2019.
—N/a (Note: A Park system is a network of urban parks and other forms of green spaces. Park systems do not constitute a singular urban park.)	North Saskatchewan River valley parks system	Edmonton Metropolitan Region	Canada	River Valley Alliance	18,285.8	7,400.0	The park system is a continuous collection of various municipal and provincial urban parks located along the North Saskatchewan River valley. It makes up the second largest continuous expanse of urban parkland in Canada.
16	South Mountain Park	Phoenix	United States	Phoenix Parks and Recreation Department	16,281.8	6,589.0	The park preserves a mountainous area of native desert vegetation. The park was designated a Phoenix Points of Pride, and includes the Mystery Castle landmark.
17	Serras do Porto Park	Porto metropolitan area	Portugal	City Halls of Gondomar, Paredes and Valongo	14,762.1	5,974.0	Park of the Mountains of Porto, contained in the Functional Urban of Area of Porto, in the municipalities of Gondomar, Paredes and Valongo.
—N/a	Western Sydney Parklands	Sydney	Australia	New South Wales National Parks and Wildlife Service	13,047.2	5,280.0	A series of urban parks and a nature reserve. The parklands are largely a series of connected green spaces, roughly following the western portion of the M7 cycleway and the Westlink M7.
18	Changa Manga	Lahore	Pakistan	Punjab Forest Department	12,515.0	5,064.6	Established in 1866 as a wildlife preserve, it is home to a number of endangered species, and is a protected area of Pakistan. The park was formerly the largest man-made forest in the world.
19	Appian Way Regional Park	Rome	Italy	Appian Way Park	11,317.4	4,580.0	The largest urban park in the European Union. It consists of the Appian Way, from the centre of Rome to the 10th Mile and it contains a majority of the relics of Ancient Rome to be found outside the city centre.
20	Lee Valley Park	London	United Kingdom	Lee Valley Regional Park Authority	10,000.0	4,046.9	The largest urban park located within Greater London. The park follows the course of River Lea along the Lea Valley. It also contains the Walthamstow Marshes, a Site of Special Scientific Interest.
21	Government Canyon State Natural Area	San Antonio	United States	Texas Parks and Wildlife Department	12,244.0	4,955.0	Opened to the public in October 2005, the natural area consists of rugged hills, and canyons typical of the Texas Hill Country.
—N/a	Trinity River Project	Dallas	United States	Government of Dallas	10,000.0	4,046.9	The project is a public works project undertaken to redevelop the Trinity River. The area that makes up the project is the largest bottomland hardwood forest in the world.
22	Tijuca National Park	Rio de Janeiro	Brazil	Rio de Janeiro Chico Mendes Institute for Biodiversity Conservation	9,781.4	3,958.4	Created in 1962, the contemporary Tijuca National Park and its surrounding forests are largely the result of reforestation. In 2012, UNESCO designated the landscapes around Rio de Janeiro, including the park, as a world heritage site. It's the largest urban forest in the world.
23	Cullen Park	Houston	United States	Houston Parks and Recreation Department	9,270.0	3,751.4	
24	Ulsan Grand Park	Ulsan	South Korea		8,995.0	3,640.1	Created in 2006, it is the largest urban park in South Korea. It includes trails, a nature centre, a botanical garden, a butterfly and petting zoo, and several playgrounds.
25	Topanga State Park	Los Angeles	United States	California State Parks	8,960.0	3,626.0	The state park forms a part of the larger Santa Monica Mountains National Recreation Area. The park it is the largest urban park located within its metropolitan boundaries in the United States – outside of Texas.
26	Forest of Saint-Germain-en-Laye	Ile-de-France/Greater Paris Metro Area	France	National Office for Forests (ONF)	8,648.7	3,500.0	This forest occupies most of the land formed by a large loop in the Seine river just to the west of inner Paris. At its southern edge is the Château de Saint-Germain-en-Laye, one of the main historic residences of the Kings of France until it was abandoned in 1862 by Louis XIV for Versailles. At the time of the French revolution in 1789 it became a fôret dominiale (state/public forest).
27	Namhansanseong Provincial Park	Seongnam	South Korea	Namhansanseong Provincial Park Office	8,512.8	3,445.0	A provincial park that includes the Namhansanseong mountain military fortress. In 2014 it was designated as a World Heritage Site by UNESCO.
28	Timucuan Preserve	Jacksonville	United States	National Park Service	7,870.0	3,184.9	The national preserve was established in 1988, comprising wetlands, and waterways. The preserve contains Fort Caroline, Kingsley Plantation, and archaeological sites for the Mocama people, and a Spanish mission
29	George Bush Park	Houston	United States	Harris County, Precinct Three	7,800.0	3,156.5	The park was named after George H. W. Bush, and is mostly undeveloped forests within Barker Reservoir. Primarily used as flood control, the park includes trails, sports fields, a shooting range, and a number of playgrounds.
30	Phoenix Sonoran Preserve	Phoenix	United States	City of Phoenix Parks & Recreation Department	9,612.4	3,890.0	The preserve is a large permanently protected, sustainable desert habitat.
31	Newport News Park	Newport News	United States	Newport News Department of Parks, Recreation and Tourism	7,711.0	3,120.5	Largest municipal park in the Eastern United States. The park is situated in the watershed around the Lee Hall reservoir. The park offers campsites, a number of trails, an archery range, disc golf course, and an educational discovery center.
32	North Mountain and Shaw Butte Preserves	Phoenix	United States	Phoenix Parks and Recreation Department	7,500.0	3,035.1	The North Mountain Preserve and Shaw Butte Preserve are two Phoenix Mountain Preserves adjacent to one another.
33	Forest of Sénart	Ile-de-France/Greater Paris Metro Area	France	National Office for Forests (ONF)	7,413.2	3,000.0	Forest and nature reserve protected by Parisians against the suburban and industrial encroachment and has up to 3 million visitors each year. It forms part of the arc of parks and forests surrounding Paris, to its south-east, bordered by the Seine on its west and just south of Orly airport.
34	Mission Trails Regional Park	San Diego	United States	San Diego Parks and Recreation Department	7,219.0	2,921.4	The park consists of rugged canyons, hills, and the highest point in San Diego, Cowles Mountain. The park include trails, a rock climbing area, a visitor center, the Kumeyaay Lake campgrounds, and Old Mission Dam.
35	Verkiai Regional Park	Vilnius	Lithuania	State Department of Protected Areas	6,700.0	2,711.4	Verkiai Regional Park is located in Vilnius City, on the right bank of Neris River. 77% is covered by forests. It was founded in 1992 to preserve the Green Lakes, Verkiai Palace, Kalvarijos, and Trinapolis.
36	Royal National City Park	Stockholm/Solna/Lidingö	Sweden	County Administrative Board of Stockholm	6,521.1	2,639.0	
37	Jefferson Memorial Forest	Louisville	United States	Louisville Parks Department	6,011.0	2,432.6	Established as a forest preserve in 1946. The forest runs along the Muldraugh Hill, with most of the hill made up of siltstone and shale. The forest includes several recreational and camping areas, along with hiking trails.
38	William B. Umstead State Park	Raleigh	United States	North Carolina Division of Parks and Recreation	5,579.0	2,257.7	The state park is a part of the southeastern mixed forests ecosystem. It also contains Crabtree Creek Recreational Demonstration Area, a U.S. National Historic Landmark that contain a protected area of beech trees.
39	Bitsa Park	Moscow	Russia		5,457.0	2,208.4	The park is traversed by the Chertanovka and Bitsa rivers. The park is home to a number of animal, and plant species, as well as Moscow Paleontological Museum.
40	Forest of Montmorency	Ile-de-France/Greater Paris Metro Area	France	National Office for Forests (ONF)	5,436.3	2,200.0	This state forest is to the north of Paris in the Val d’Oise (Oise river valley) of Ile-de-France and is part of the arc of forests that encircle Paris in Ile-de-France.
41	Brescia Hills Park	Brescia	Italy		5,394.3	2,183.0	
42	El Tepeyac National Park	Mexico City	Mexico	National Commission of Protected Natural Areas	5,322.0	2,153.7	The national park is an artificial forest of eucalyptus reforested in the first half of the 20th century, and parts of the Sierra de Guadalupe mountain range. The park is also houses the Basilica of Our Lady of Guadalupe.
43	Pavilniai Regional Park	Vilnius	Lithuania	State Department of Protected Areas	5,255.7	2,126.9	Pavilniai Regional Park is located east of central Vilnius and houses the banks of the Vilnia river and the beautiful Pūčkoriai Exposure. It also has 21.05 km of educational trails.
44	Ahupua'a O Kahana State Park	Honolulu	United States	Hawai'i Department of Land and Natural Resources	5,229.0	2,116.1	The state park is Hawaii's only ahupuaa and stretches from Kahana Bay to the peak of Puʻu Pauao. The park holds a variety of vegetation zones, as it spans the Kahana Valley, from the sea to the mountain.
45	Forest Park	Portland	United States	Portland Parks & Recreation Department	5,157.0	2,087.0	The park is situated in the Coast range ecoregion. Consisting mostly of second-growth forest with few patches of old growth, the park includes a number of trails, including a segment of the 40-Mile Loop.
46	Forest of Marly	Ile-de-France/Greater Paris Metro Area	France	National Office for Forests (ONF)	4,942.1	2,000.0	This forest is to the west of Paris and separates the suburb of Versailles to the south from the suburb of St- Germain-en-Laye to the north which itself borders the south of the St- Germain-en-Laye forest.
47	Eagle Creek Park	Indianapolis	United States	Indy Parks	4,766.0	1,928.7	The park is the largest urban park in Indianapolis. It includes a fishing areas, sporting facilities, a marina, a beach, an ornithology center, and a bird sanctuary.
48	Far North Bicentennial Park	Anchorage	United States	Anchorage Parks and Recreation Department	4,500.0	1,821.1	
49	Shelby Farms	Memphis	United States	Shelby Farms Park Conservancy	4,500.0	1,821.1	The park consisting of lakes, natural forests, and wetlands, that provide habitats a number of species. A penal farm from 1929 to 1964, it was reopened into a public park in the 1970s.
50	Calero County Park	San Jose	United States	Santa Clara County Parks	4,471.0	1,809.3	The park surrounds the Calero Reservoir and provides picnic areas, hiking trails, boating, and limited fishing. The reservoir was formed by the Calero Dam, builtin 1953.
51	Santiago Metropolitan Park	Santiago	Chile	Ministry of Housing and Urban Development	4,410.0	1,784.7	The park is Chile's largest urban park. Major attractions located within the park include the Chilean National Zoo, Jardín Botánico Chagual, public pools, San Cristóbal Hill and the sanctuary located there.
52	Blue Mountain-Birch Cove Lakes Wilderness Area	Halifax	Canada	Nova Scotia Department of Natural Resources	4,366.4	1,767.0	A provincial wilderness area established in 2009, and is protected by the Government of Nova Scotia.
53	False Cape State Park	Virginia Beach	United States	Virginia Department of Conservation and Recreation	4,321.0	1,748.6	The state park is located on the Currituck Banks peninsula, a barrier spit between the Currituck Sound and the Atlantic Ocean. Established in 1966, it includes trails, a visitor center, and camping facilities.
54	Casa de Campo	Madrid	Spain		4,260.0	1,724.0	Originally a royal hunting ground and now Madrid's largest urban park. The park contains several attractions, including the Parque de Atracciones de Madrid, the Madrid Arena, and the Madrid Zoo.
55	Griffith Park	Los Angeles	United States	Los Angeles Department of Recreation and Parks	4,217.0	1,706.6	The park is the second-largest municipally managed park in California. The park is home to a number of attractions including hiking and equestrian trails, Bronson Canyon, Griffith Observatory, and the Los Angeles Zoo.
56	Fairmount Park	Philadelphia	United States	Philadelphia Parks & Recreation	4,167.0	1,686.3	The park is bisected by the Schuylkill River and contains a number of historic properties, such as the Fairmount Water Works. The park was listed as a historic district on the U.S. National Register of Historic Places in 1972.
—N/a	Oldman River valley parks system	Lethbridge	Canada		4,000.0	1,618.7	The park system is a continuous collection of eight urban parks developed along the Oldman River valley system. The park system was developed during the 1980s.
57	Izmaylovsky Park	Moscow	Russia		3,973.7	1,608.1	The park is situated in Moscow's Izmaylovo District. Inaugurated in 1931, the park includes the Izmaylovsky forest, two ferris wheels, an amusement park, a cinema, swimming pool, a dolphinarium, and several sporting facilities.
58	Pumpkin Hill Creek Preserve State Park	Jacksonville	United States	Florida Department of Environmental Protection	3,896.0	1,576.7	A state nature preserve maintained by the Government of Florida.
59	Walter E. Long Park	Austin	United States	Austin Parks and Recreation Department	3,715.0	1,503.4	
60	Bidwell Park	Chico	United States	Chico Park Division	3,670.0	1,485.2	The park is divided into two sections. The upper park has a steep terrain with little soil, and features the unique Chico Formation sandstone. The lower park is flat and level with deep soil structure supporting a thick canopy of trees.
61	Fort Worth Nature Center and Refuge	Fort Worth	United States	Fort Worth Parks & Recreation	3,662.0	1,482.0	
62	Mountain Creek Lake Park	Dallas	United States	Dallas Park & Recreation	3,643.0	1,474.3	
63	Forest of Armainvilliers	Ile-de-France/Greater Paris Metro Area	France	National Office for Forests (ONF)	3,583.0	1,450.0	The former hunting forest associated with the château d'Armainvilliers is to the east of Paris, just south of Disneyland. It forms a part of the arc of forests and nature reserves that encircle Paris in Ile-de-France.
64	Bays Mountain Park	Kingsport	United States	Kingsport Parks & Recreation	3,585.0	1,450.8	Located on the Bays Mountain, the park features a trails, nature center, a historical farming museum, a herpetarium, and a planetarium.
65	Plum Tree Island National Wildlife Refuge	Poquoson	United States	United States Fish and Wildlife Service	3,501.0	1,416.8	Located on the Chesapeake Bay and midway point of the Atlantic Flyway
66	Bonita Lakes Park	Meridian	United States	Meridian Parks & Recreation	3,462.0	1,401.0	
67	North Landing River Natural Area Preserve	Virginia Beach	United States	Virginia Department of Conservation and Recreation	3,440.0	1,392.1	Established in 1990, the preserve was the first in Virginia Natural Area Preserve System. It is made up mostly of wetlands, including pocosins, an increasingly scarce type of wetland in southeastern United States.
68	Pippy Park	St. John's	Canada	C. A. Pippy Park Commission	3,400.0	1,375.9	The park is the largest urban park managed by a Canadian province. The park includes golf courses, camping facilities, trails, as well as incorporating the main campus of the Memorial University of Newfoundland.
69	Fish Creek Provincial Park	Calgary	Canada	Alberta Culture and Tourism	3,331.0	1,348.0	The provincial park is the fourth largest urban park in Canada, and the largest west of Ontario. The park includes a number of trails, picnicking and camping areas, forested areas, an artificial lake, and a visitor centre.
—N/a (Note: Warner Parks is the collective name of two separate parks next to one another. The parks (Edwin Warner Park, and Percy Warner Park) are managed as two separate parks by the Nashville Board of Parks and Recreation.)	Warner Parks	Nashville	United States	Nashville Board of Parks and Recreation	3,195.0	1,268.7	Warner Parks is made up of two parks separated by Old Hickory Boulevard. Collectively, the parks were listed as a historic district on the National Register of Historic Places in 1984.
70	Mohawk Park and Golf Course	Tulsa	United States	Tulsa parks and recreation	3,100.0	1,254.5	Much of the original development was done by the Civilian Conservation Corps (CCC) and Works Progress Administration (WPA). Among its features are the Tulsa Zoo, Oxley Nature Center, Lake Yahola and the Mohawk Park Golf Course. A soccer field was added in 2013.
71	Brecksville Reservation	Brecksville	United States	Cleveland Metroparks	3,026.0	1,224.6	The reservation is the largest urban park in the state of Ohio. The Chippewa Creek flows through the reservation, and is home to sections of the Buckeye Trail.
72	Las Łagiewnicki	Łódź	Poland	Łódź Hills Landscape Park	2,977.6	1,205.0	It is the largest recreational area in the city and one of the largest forest complexes within the city limits in Europe.
73	Forest of Meudon	Ile-de-France/Greater Paris Metro Area	France	National Office for Forests (ONF)	2,965.3	1,200.0	This forest almost touches the south-west corner of inner-Paris, adjoining the suburbs of Meudon and Sèvres. It stretches westward to Versailles.
74	Natal Dunes State Park	Natal	Brazil	Rio Grande do Norte Institute of Sustainable Development and Environment	2,896.0	1,172.0	The state park protects an area of Atlantic Forest, and dunes. The park includes a visitor centre, research centre, amphitheatre, an artificial lake, trails, and a seeding nursery for native species that inhabit the park.
75	Cecil Greens Fieldway	Jacksonville	United States	Jacksonville Department of Parks, Recreation and Community Services	2,866.0	1,159.8	
76	Cocó Park	Fortaleza	Brazil	Ceará Department of the Environment	2,855.0	1,155.4	The state park is an area of conservation established in 1977. The park is an area of protection for the globally threatened Mangrove ecosystem, which is home to a number of threatened animal and plant species.
77	Nose Hill Park	Calgary	Canada	Calgary Parks and Recreation	2,785.0	1,127.0	Located in northwest Calgary, the park was developed in the 1980s, and designated as a protected area by the city. The park is a part of the rough fescue grassland ecosystem.
78	Pelham Bay Park	New York City	United States	NYC Parks	2,772.0	1,121.8	The largest park in New York City, its geographical features include Rodman's Neck and Hunter Island, with a lagoon running through its center. Attractions at the park include Orchard Beach and Bartow-Pell Mansion.
79	Monsanto Forest Park	Lisbon	Portugal	Government of Lisbon	2,471.0	1,000.0	The park is a municipally-protected forest created in 1934, with a large number of species introduced during the reforesting of Monsanto Hills. Much of the park's original vegetation was destroyed by intensive agricultural use.
80	Bois de Vincennes	Paris	France		2,456.0	993.9	Created by Napoleon III, the park is the largest in Paris. It includes an English landscape garden with four lakes, the Arboretum de l'École du Breuil, the Parc floral de Paris, and the Paris Zoological Park.
81	Los Peñasquitos Canyon Preserve	San Diego	United States	County of San Diego Parks and Recreation & City of San Diego Parks and Recreation Department	2,405.0	973.3	The park is home to a number of plant and bird species, and is jointly administered between the City and County of San Diego. The park home to the historic Rancho Santa Maria de Los Peñasquitos, an adobe home built in the 1820s.
82	Sutton Park	Birmingham	United Kingdom	Birmingham City Council	2,400.0	971.2	The park consists of heathland wetlands, marshes, lakes, and ancient woodland, golf courses, playgrounds, and restaurants. It is considered a U.K. national nature reserve, as well as a scheduled ancient monument.
83	Kislovodsk National Park	Kislovodsk	Russia	Russian Ministry of Natural Resources and Environment	2,384.6	965.8	The park was established in 1823 and is located in the South Russian resort and recreational region. The park possesses a rich natural diversity and valuable Mineral springs. A National Park since 2016.
84	Longview Lake Park	Kansas City	United States	Jackson County Parks + Rec	2,381.0	963.6	
85	Richmond Park	London	United Kingdom	The Royal Parks	2,360.0	955.1	The largest of London's Royal Parks. Second largest park overall in London.A national nature reserve, a Site of Special Scientific Interest, a Special Area of Conservation, and included on Historic England's historic register for parks.
86	Anhanguera Park	São Paulo	Brazil	Secretaria Municipal do Verde e do Meio Ambiente de São Paulo	2,347.5	950.0	The park is the largest municipal park in São Paulo.
87	Blue River Parkway	Kansas City	United States	Kansas City Parks and Recreation	2,319.0	938.5	
88	Amsterdamse Bos (Amsterdam Forest)	Amsterdam	The Netherlands	City of Amsterdam	2,310.0	934.8	Forest sandwiched between the capital city and the international airport Schiphol Amsterdam. Its maintenance has fallen behind despite having a professional dedicated operating department.
89	Wascana Centre	Regina	Canada	Saskatchewan Provincial Capital Commission	2,300.0	930.8	Designed around the provincial Legislative Building. The park features a 500-acre lake, mature urban forest, and recreational, arts, cultural, educational, environmental, and government facilities.
90	Mill Stream Run Reservation	Strongsville	United States	Cleveland Metroparks	2,238.0	905.7	
91	Fleming Park	Lee's Summit	United States	Jackson County Parks + Rec	2,229.0	902.0	The park is the largest in Jackson County, Missouri. It includes an outdoor history museum, Missouri Town 1855, and two large lakes, Lake Jacomo, and Blue Springs Lake.
92	Steele Creek Park	Bristol	United States	Bristol Parks & Recreation Department	2,224.0	900.0	
93	Lynn Woods Reservation	Lynn	United States	Government of Lynn	2,200.0	890.3	The park encompasses nearly one-fifth of the land area of the city. In 1996, the entire reservation was added to the National Register of Historic Places in 1996 as a historic district.
94	Rockwood Park	Saint John	Canada	Saint John Transportation & Environment Services	2,200.0	890.3	The park is located in eastern area of Saint John's North End. A part of the larger Acadian forests ecoregion, the park contains trails that provide access to park's hills, caves, as well as several fresh water lakes.
95	Bear Creek Pioneers Park	Houston	United States	Harris County, Precinct Three	2,168.0	877.4	Occupies a portion of the Addicks Reservoir, and includes equestrian and walking trails, a small zoo, an aviary, playgrounds, a variety of sports facilities, and picnicking areas.
96	Bois de Boulogne	Paris	France		2,090.0	845.8	Established in 1852, the park contains several gardens including Jardin des Serres d'Auteuil, several sporting facilities, the Château de Bagatelle, Jardin d'Acclimatation amusement park, and the Longchamp Racecourse.
97	Tilden Regional Park	Berkeley	United States	East Bay Regional Park District	2,079.0	841.3	The park is made up of valleys with large amounts of timber with trails going through it. In addition, the park is home to the Regional Parks Botanic Garden, the Tilden Park Merry-Go-Round, and the Redwood Valley Railway.
98	Myślęcinek	Bydgoszcz	Poland	Kultury i Wypoczynku Myślęcinek Sp. z.o.o.	2,050.97	830	Created in 1975, the biggest urban park in Poland.
99	Sepulveda Basin Recreation Area	Los Angeles	United States	Los Angeles Department of Recreation and Parks	2,031.0	821.9	
100	Galveston Island State Park	Galveston	United States	Texas Parks and Wildlife Department	2,013.0	814.6	The state park was established in 1975 and protects dunes, estuaries, wetlands, brackish ponds and beaches. A public campground is located within the state park.
101	Äußerer Grüngürtel	Cologne	Germany		1,976.8	800.0	
102	Ada Ciganlija	Belgrade	Serbia		1,976.0	799.7	
103	Smith and Bybee Wetlands Natural Area	Portland	United States	Metro	1,973.0	798.4	One of the largest urban freshwater wetlands in the US, with an artificial water-control-system helping to maintain it. Includes a covered shelter, restrooms, and a canoe launch in its northern area.
104	White Rock Lake Park	Dallas	United States	Dallas Park & Recreation	1,952.0	789.9	The park surrounds White Rock Lake, a reservoir created by the damming of White Rock Creek. The park hosts a number of trails, as well as the Bath House Cultural Center, and the Dallas Arboretum and Botanical Garden.
105	Pacific Spirit Regional Park	University Endowment Lands (Note: The University Endowment Lands is not a municipality, but an area administered directly by the Government of British Columbia. The area lies west of the City of Vancouver.)	Canada	BC Parks	1,885.0	762.8	Located west of Vancouver, it was established as a provincial nature preserve in 1975, and surrounds the endowment lands of the University of British Columbia. The park includes several trails and clothing optional beaches.
106	Sandwell Valley Park	West Bromwich and Birmingham, UK	United Kingdom	Sandwell Council	1,878.0	760.0	Remained almost intact as one estate since the Middle Ages, when it was originally given to the monks of Sandwell Priory. After passing through several hands, it was eventually sold to the Earl of Dartmouth, who in turn sold it to West Bromwich Council in 1947.
107	Swope Park	Kansas City	United States	Kansas City Parks and Recreation	1,805.0	730.5	The park was donated to the city in 1896 by Thomas H. Swope. It hosts a number of facilities including the Swope Soccer Village and Swope Memorial Golf Course, the Starlight Theatre, and the Kansas City Zoological Park.
108	Torrey Pines State Natural Reserve	San Diego	United States	California State Parks	1,800.0	728.4	The state natural reserve consists of a plateau with cliffs that overlook Torrey Pines State Beach, and a lagoon. The state natural reserve was designated as a U.S. National Natural Landmark in 1977.
109	Hubbard Park	Meriden	United States	Meriden Department of Parks and Recreation	1,800.0	728.4	The park located on a wooded trap rock mountain ridge that overlooks the city. The park includes both the South Mountain, and the East Peak. In 1997, the park was listed on the U.S. National Register of Historic Places.
110	Staten Island Greenbelt	New York City	United States	NYC Parks	1,778.0	719.5	The Greenbelt is a system of contiguous parkland and natural areas on Staten Island. It contains forested hills that run the length of the island's midsection, while wetlands and ponds fill most of the low-lying areas.
111	Barton Creek Greenbelt	Austin	United States	Austin Parks and Recreation Department	1,771.0	716.7	The Greenbelt is a stretch of public land and green space along the Barton Creek, a tributary of the Colorado River. The park also features large limestone cliffs, trails, and Airmen's Cave.
112	Little Talbot Island State Park	Jacksonville	United States	Florida Department of Environmental Protection	1,768.0	715.5	The state park covers the entire island, and contains maritime forests, dunes, and salt marshes on the western portion of the island. The park amenities include a full-facility campground, picnic pavilions, and trails.
113	Phoenix Park	Dublin	Ireland	Irish Office of Public Works	1,760.0	712.2	The park is an enclosed urban park and features several attractions including Ashtown Castle, Áras an Uachtaráin, Deerfield Residence, Dublin Zoo, Magazine Fort, and the Wellington Monument.
114	Mission Bay Park	San Diego	United States	San Diego Parks and Recreation Department	1,756.0	710.6	The park is the largest man-made aquatic park in the country, consisting primarily of water. The park features a number of trails, golf courses, a visitor center, SeaWorld San Diego, and Belmont amusement park.
115	Rock Creek Park	Washington, D.C.	United States	National Park Service	1,754.0	709.8	The park bisects the Northwest quadrant of Washington, D.C., along the Rock Creek Valley. The park was listed as a historic district on the U.S. National Register of Historic Places in 1991.
116	Tijuana River Valley Regional Park	San Diego	United States	County of San Diego Parks and Recreation	1,710.0	692.0	
117	Big Talbot Island State Park	Jacksonville	United States	Florida Department of Environmental Protection	1,708.0	691.2	The state park is a nature preserve, whose coastal landscape and beach is unique within Florida, as it is made from rock-like sedimentary hardpan soil deposits. Parts of the island is included in the Machaba Balu Preserve.
118	Monza Park	Monza	Italy		1,700.1	688.0	The park was originally an external part of the Monza's Royal Villa, and is presently the largest "walled park" in Europe. The park contains lawns, wooded areas, and the Autodromo Nazionale Monza racetrack.
119	Burns Park	North Little Rock	United States	North Little Rock Parks and Recreation	1,700.0	688.0	The park features two golf courses, Funland Amusement Park, sporting facilities, trails, and a camping area.
120	Chapultepec Park	Mexico City	Mexico		1,695.0	685.9	The park is divided into three sections, and includes a number of attractions such as Chapultepec Castle, Chapultepec Zoo, the National Museum of Anthropology, and Museo Rufino Tamayo.
121	Oglebay Park	Wheeling	United States	Wheeling Park Commission	1,650.0	667.7	Established in 1928, the park incorporates several sporting facilities, gardens, a pool, a zoo, a planetarium, and a greenhouse. The Mansion Museum at the park has been listed on the U.S. National Register of Historic Places.
122	Fort Harrison State Park	Lawrence	United States	Indiana Department of Natural Resources	1,640.0	663.7	The state park was opened in 1996, and occupies the former site of Fort Benjamin Harrison. The park is home to the Museum of 20th Century Warfare, a park inn, golf resort, and three hiking trails.
123	Lichtbos Eindhoven	Eindhoven	the Netherlands	Gemeente Eindhoven	1,630.9	660.0	Lichtbos Eindhoven (formerly known simply as the "city forest") is a nature area in the northwestern part of the Dutch city of Eindhoven. It is an extensive forest and park landscape designed as a cohesive urban woodland. The name refers to the area's historical connection with Philips' heritage and Eindhoven's lighting industry.
124	Lake Leatherwood Park	Eureka Springs	United States	Eureka Springs Parks and Recreation Commission	1,620.0	655.6	The park is located along Lake Leatherwood, an artificial lake created from damming by the Civilian Conservation Corps. The park was listed as a historic district on the U.S. National Register of Historic Places in 1998.
125	Pennypack Park	Philadelphia	United States	Philadelphia Parks & Recreation	1,618.0	654.8	Pennypack Park consists of woodlands, meadows, wetlands, and portions of Pennypack Creek. The park also contains Pennepack Baptist Church, and the Frankford Avenue Bridge, the oldest bridge still in use in the U.S.
126	Manzanares Park	Madrid	Spain		1,606.0	649.9	Established in 2003, the park is situated along the Manzanares River. The park includes an amphitheatre, and a sports area.
127	Claremont Hills Wilderness Park	Claremont	United States	Claremont Human Services Department	1,589.0	643.0	
128	Eilenriede	Hanover	Germany		1,581.5	640.0	
129	Silesian Park	Chorzów	Poland	WPKiW S.A.	1,532.0	620.0	The park is a recreation complex that includes the a variety of sporting facilities including Silesian Stadium, several gardens including the Silesian Zoological Garden, the Silesian Planetarium, and Silesian Amusement Park
130	Adobe Dam Regional Park	Phoenix	United States	Maricopa County Parks and Recreation Department	1,526.0	617.6	
131	Hidden Valley Wildlife Area	Riverside	United States	Riverside County Regional Park and Open-Space District	1,510.0	611.1	
132	Red Mountain Park	Birmingham	United States	Red Mountain Greenway and Recreational Area Commission	1,500.0	607.0	The woodland park encloses a section of the Red Mountain, a prominent ridge that passes through Birmingham. Opened in 2012, the park contains a number of closed mines once used by the city's industry.
133	Water Works Park	Des Moines	United States	Des Moines Water Works	1,500.0	607.0	The park is located along the Raccoon River, and offers trails, a picnic area, and open fields. The park is also home to the Arie den Boer Arboretum, with one of the largest collection of crab apple trees in the world.
134	Prater	Vienna	Austria		1,500.0	607.0	The park includes Wurstelprater amusement park, the Vienna ferris wheel, a planetarium, and a museum. Purchased in 1560 as a hunting ground for Emperor Maximilian II, Prater was later opened to the public in 1766.
135	Beaman Park	Nashville	United States	Nashville Board of Parks and Recreation	1,493.0	604.2	
136	Presidio of San Francisco Park	San Francisco	United States	National Park Service	1,491.0	603.4	The park is a part of the Golden Gate National Recreation Area. Originally a U.S. Army military fort, in 1962, the Presidio was listed on the U.S. National Register of Historic Places as a National Historic Landmark.
137	Arignar Anna Zoological Park	Chennai	India	Central Zoo Authority of India	1,490.0	603.0	The park is the largest zoological garden in India, with an objective to be a repository of the state's fauna. Zoological facilities include a rescue and rehabilitation centre, a breeding centre, veterinary hospital.
138	Wilderness Park	Lincoln	United States	Lincoln Parks & Recreation	1,472.0	595.7	The park is heavily wooded, but also includes some prairieland. Because of the unrestricted flow of the Salt Creek in the area, the lay of the park changes over time.
139	Mount Airy Forest	Cincinnati	United States	Cincinnati Park Board	1,471.0	595.3	The park was established in 1911, and was one of the earliest urban reforestation projects in the United States. In 2010, the park was listed on the U.S. National Register of Historic Places.
140	Memorial Park	Houston	United States	Houston Parks and Recreation Department	1,466.0	593.3	The park is located inside the northwest portion of the 610 Loop, with Memorial Drive bisecting through the park. The park houses a number of sporting facilities, as well as the Houston Arboretum and Nature Center.
141	Glenn Cunningham Lake Park	Omaha	United States	Omaha Parks, Recreation, and Public Property Department	1,439.0	582.3	
142	Hansen Dam Recreation Center	Los Angeles	United States	Los Angeles Department of Recreation and Parks	1,437.0	581.5	
143	Stumpy Lake Park	Virginia Beach	United States	Virginia Beach Parks & Recreation	1,435.0	580.7	
144	Sycamore Canyon Wilderness Park	Riverside	United States	Riverside Parks, Recreation, and Community Services	1,424.0	576.3	
145	Parque Metropolitano Guangüiltagua	Quito	Ecuador		1,418.4	574.0	
146	Kincaid Park	Anchorage	United States	Anchorage Parks and Recreation Department	1,411.0	571.0	The park is bounded by the Turnagain Arm and the by Knik Arm. It hosts several hiking Nordic skiing trails, including a portion of the Tony Knowles Coastal Trail, a golf course, soccer fields, and a deactivated Nike missile site.
147	Englischer Garten	Munich	Germany	Bavarian Administration of State-Owned Palaces, Gardens and Lakes	1,400.0	566.6	Landscaped as an English garden, the park stretches from the city centre to the northeastern city limit. The park also includes a Japanese Teahouse and an artificial stream for surfing.
148	Rancho Diana	San Antonio	United States	San Antonio Parks & Recreation	1,392.0	563.3	
149	Grünes U	Stuttgart	Germany	Garten-, Friedhofs- und Forstamt	1,383.8	560.0	
150	Sacred Falls State Park	Honolulu	United States	Hawai'i Department of Land and Natural Resources	1,374.0	556.0	The state park is a valley with perpendicular cliffs, streams, and falls. The state park is not open to the public, and access to it is prohibited by state officials.
151	Forest Park	St. Louis	United States	St. Louis Department of Parks, Recreation, and Forestry	1,371.0	554.8	The park is a prominent civic center opened in 1876. It is home to several regional institutions including the Missouri History Museum, Saint Louis Art Museum, Saint Louis Science Center, Saint Louis Zoo, and The Muny theater.
152	Latta Plantation Nature Center and Preserve	Huntersville	United States	Mecklenburg County Parks and Recreation	1,343.0	543.5	
153	Garden of the Gods Park	Colorado Springs	United States	Colorado Springs Parks, Recreation, and Cultural Services Department	1,319.0	533.8	The park includes a sedimentary beds of red, pink, and white sandstones, conglomerates, and limestone, which over time has formed a number of fins, and hogbacks. The park was named a National Natural Landmark in 1971.
154	City Park	New Orleans	United States	New Orleans City Park Improvement Association	1,300.0	526.1	Established in 1854, the park holds the world's largest collection of mature live oak trees, some more than 600 years in age. The park is unusual as it is largely self-supporting, with most of its budget derived from self-generated revenue.
155	Balboa Park	San Diego	United States	San Diego Parks and Recreation Department	1,291.0	522.4	The park contains both open and natural spaces, gardens, trails, museums and theaters, and the San Diego Zoo. The park was listed in the U.S. National Register of Historic Places as a National Historic Landmark District in 1977.
156	Black Mountain Open Space Park	San Diego	United States	San Diego Parks and Recreation Department	1,284.0	519.6	The park covers the Black Mountain Ranch and Rancho Peñasquitos areas of northern San Diego, and contains a number of trails. The area the park inhabits was formerly home to arsenic and gold mines.
157	North Cheyenne Cañon Park	Colorado Springs	United States	Colorado Springs Parks, Recreation, and Cultural Services Department	1,260.0	509.9	The park is located in Cheyenne Cañon, with much of its bedrock made from Pierre Shale. The park includes trails, picnicking areas, and a nature center. In 2009, the park was added to the U.S. National Register of Historic Places.
158	Middle Harbor Shoreline Park	Oakland	United States	Port of Oakland	1,220.0	493.7	The park is located along the entrance channel of the Port of Oakland in the San Francisco Bay. The park was once the Oakland Naval Supply Depot, before it was transferred to the Port of Oakland in 1998, who converted it to a park.
159	Lincoln Park	Chicago	United States	Chicago Park District	1,216.0	492.1	Situated along Lake Michigan, the park contains a zoo, a conservatory, a nature museum and a history museum. The Alfred Caldwell Lily Pool in Lincoln Park was also registered as a U.S. National Historic Landmark in 2006.
160	Anacostia Park	Washington, D.C.	United States	National Park Service	1,215.0	491.7	Located on the southern shoreline of the Anacostia River, the park contains a variety of outdoor sporting facilities, including Langston Golf Course, and a marina. The park also headquarters U.S. National Capital Parks-East.
161	Cave Buttes Recreation Area	Phoenix	United States		1,200.0	485.6	
162	Gwynns Falls Leakin Park	Baltimore	United States	Baltimore Department of Parks and Recreation	1,200.0	485.6	Situated along the Gwynns Falls stream, the park is a local protected wilderness area that is heavily forested and largely left in its natural state. The Carrie Murray Nature Center is located in the park.
163	Liberty State Park	Jersey City	United States	New Jersey Division of Parks and Forestry	1,188.0	480.8	The New Jersey state park sits opposite of New York City's Ellis and Liberty Islands. Most of the park sits on landfill, and is home to the Liberty Science Center, and one of the few remaining tidal salt marshes along the Hudson river.
164	Parque de Valdebebas	Madrid	Spain		1,186.0	480.0	
165	Thunderbird Conservation Park	Glendale	United States	Glendale Parks and Recreation Department	1,185.0	479.6	
166	Alfred B. Maclay Gardens State Park	Tallahassee	United States	Florida Department of Environmental Protection	1,179.0	477.1	The state park is a botanical garden that was established in 1953. In 2002, the gardens was listed as a part of the Killearn Plantation Archaeological and Historic District on the U.S. National Register of Historic Places.
167	Three Creeks Parks	Columbus	United States	Metro Parks	1,156.0	467.8	
168	Red Mountain Park	Mesa	United States	Mesa Parks, Recreation, and Community Facilities	1,146.3	463.9	
169	Van Cortlandt Park	New York City	United States	NYC Parks	1,146.0	463.8	Located in the Bronx, the park contains the oldest surviving building in the borough, the Van Cortlandt House Museum. Other facilities include two golf courses, several miles of paths and trails, and other smaller sporting facilities.
170	T.O. Fuller State Park	Memphis	United States	Tennessee Department of Environment and Conservation	1,138.0	460.5	The state park consists mostly forests, as well as Chucalissa, a Mississippian culture archaeological site.
171	Emma Long Metropolitan Park	Austin	United States	Austin Parks and Recreation Department	1,137.0	460.1	Located on the shores of Lake Austin, the park was named after Emma Long in 1984, the first woman to sit on Austin City Council.
172	Monte Sano Nature Preserve	Huntsville	United States	Land Trust of North Alabama	1,107.0	448.0	Located on Monte Sano Mountain, the nature preserve consists of miles of public trails.
173	Assiniboine Park	Winnipeg	Canada	Assiniboine Park Conservancy	1,100.0	445.2	The park was designed as an English landscape garden. It includes Assiniboine Park Zoo, a conservatory, forests and gardens, a sculpture garden, and an outdoor theatre.
174	Rouge Park	Detroit	United States	Detroit Parks & Recreation	1,100.0	445.2	
175	Bushy Park	London	United Kingdom	The Royal Parks	1,099.0	444.7	The third largest urban park located in Greater London, the park was designated as a Site of Special Scientific Interest for its range of semi-natural habitats such as acid and neutral grasslands, scrub, woodland and wood pasture.
176	McDowell Nature Center and Preserve	Charlotte	United States	Mecklenburg County Parks and Recreation	1,098.0	444.3	
177	Cheyenne Mountain State Park	Colorado Springs	United States	Colorado Parks and Wildlife	1,060.0	429.0	The state park lies on the eastern flank of the Cheyenne Mountain, and is one of the last significant open spaces along the southern section of the Colorado Front Range. The park was established in 2006.
178	New Taipei Metropolitan Park	New Taipei	Taiwan	New Taipei City Government	1,047.7	424.0	Once served as a floodway of the Tamsui River, the area was redesigned in 2009 to become the largest park in northern Taiwan.
179	Mežaparks	Riga	Latvia	SIA "Rīgas meži"	1,047.7	424.0	Inaugurated in 1949, the first Russian Empire's architectural project to use the garden city movement and is now a national heritage site and architectural cultural monument.
180	Ruffner Mountain Park	Birmingham	United States	Ruffner Mountain Nature Coalition, Inc.	1,040.0	420.9	Once home to iron ore mines and stone quarries, the area was designated a nature preserve in 1977. The preserve includes a visitor center and several miles of trails.
181	Parque da Cidade Dona Sarah Kubitschek	Brasília	Brazil		1,037.8	420.0	
182	Bedford Reservation	Bedford	United States	Cleveland Metroparks	1,033.0	418.0	
183	William Blair Jr. Park	Dallas	United States	Dallas Park & Recreation	1,032.0	417.6	
184	River Legacy Park	Arlington	United States	Arlington Parks and Recreation Department	1,031.0	417.2	
185	Golden Gate Park	San Francisco	United States	San Francisco Recreation & Parks Department	1,027.0	415.6	The park is the fifth most-visited municipally-managed park in the United States. Created in 1871, it was listed on the U.S. National Register of Historic Places in 2004. The park also contains the San Francisco Botanical Garden
186	Olmos Basin Park	San Antonio	United States	San Antonio Parks & Recreation	1,010.0	408.7	
187	North Chagrin Reservation	Willoughby Hills	United States	Cleveland Metroparks	1,004.0	406.3	
188	Kings Park	Perth	Australia	Botanic Gardens and Parks Authority	1,003.0	405.9	Opened in 1895, the King's Park is a mixture of grassed parkland, botanical gardens, and natural bushland on Mount Eliza. The park is the most popular visitor destination in Western Australia.
189	Stanley Park	Vancouver	Canada	Vancouver Park Board	1,001.0	405.1	Primarily surrounded by the waters of Vancouver Harbour and English Bay, most of the park was the result of natural evolution, as opposed to a landscape architect. The park was listed as a National Historic Sites of Canada in 1988.

== See also ==
- Urban parks in Canada
