= List of nature centers in Missouri =

This is a list of nature centers and environmental education centers in the state of Missouri.

To use the sortable tables: click on the icons at the top of each column to sort that column in alphabetical order; click again for reverse alphabetical order.

Name	Location	County	Region	Summary
Audubon Center at Riverlands	West Alton	St. Charles	East Central	website, located inside the 3,700-acre Riverlands Migratory Bird Sanctuary, operated by the National Audubon Society
August A. Busch Memorial Conservation Area	Boone Township	St. Charles	East Central	6,987 acres, operated by the Missouri Department of Conservation
Bennett Spring State Park	Bennett Springs	Laclede	Mid-Missouri	3,216 acres, exhibits interpreting Missouri's springs and the park's natural environment
Big Oak Tree State Park	East Prairie	Mississippi	Southeast	1,029 acres, exhibits on area natural history, logging, drainage of Missouri's bootheel, 1812 New Madrid earthquake
Bonebrake Center of Nature and History	Salem	Dent	Mid-Missouri	website, 12 acres, operated by the Bonebrake-McMurtrey Foundation
Burr Oak Woods Nature Center	Blue Springs	Jackson	West Central	website, 1,067 acres, operated by the Missouri Department of Conservation
Burroughs Audubon Nature Center and Sanctuary	Blue Springs	Jackson	West Central	website, nature library and bird viewing center, education programs, located in 7,809-acre Fleming Park, operated by the Burroughs Audubon Society of Greater Kansas City
Cape Girardeau Conservation Nature Center	Cape Girardeau	Cape Girardeau	Southeast	website, hands-on exhibits including Native American artifacts, freshwater aquariums, located in North County Park, operated by the Missouri Department of Conservation
Cave Spring	Kansas City	Jackson	West Central	website, 39-acre urban nature center and historic area, formally known as William M. Klein Park
Earth's Classroom	Rosebud	Gasconade	Mid-Missouri	website, 179 acres, experiential environmental education center
George Owens Nature Park	Independence	Jackson	West Central	website, 86 acres, operated by the City
The Green Center	University City	St. Louis	East Central	website, arts and environmental education organization, located in Kaufman Park
Gorman Discovery Center	Kansas City	Jackson	West Central	website, operated by the Missouri Department of Conservation in 37-acre Kauffman Legacy Park
Kemper Outdoor Education Center	Blue Springs	Jackson	West Central	website, operated by the County in the 7,809-acre Fleming Park
Knob Noster State Park	Knob Noster	Johnson	West Central	3,934 acres, visitor center exhibits, nature programs
Lakeside Nature Center	Kansas City	Jackson	West Central	website, operated by Kansas City, Missouri Parks and Recreation Department, located in 1,800-acre Swope Park, also performs wildlife rehabilitation
Lewis & Clark Boathouse and Nature Center	St. Charles	St. Charles	East Central	website, includes exhibits relating to the Lewis and Clark Expedition, Native American displays and the Missouri River ecosystem
Martha LaFite Thompson Nature Sanctuary	Liberty	Clay	Northwest	website, 53 acres, adjacent to the state-owned 40-acre Rush Creek Conservation Area
Powder Valley Conservation Nature Center	Kirkwood	St. Louis	East Central	website, 116 acres, operated by the Missouri Department of Conservation
Prairie Oak Nature Center	Leawood	Newton	Southwest	website, operated by the City in 115-acre Ironwoods Park, exhibits, live native animals
Remington Nature Center of St. Joseph	St. Joseph	Buchanan	Northwest	website, operated by the City, natural, Native American and cultural history of Northwest Missouri
Roaring River State Park	Cassville	Barry	Southwest	4,093 acres, Ozark Chinquapin Nature Center open seasonally
Rockwoods Reservation	Wildwood	St. Louis	East Central	1,843-acre state forest and wildlife conservation area, Conservation Education Center
Runge Conservation Nature Center	Jefferson City	Cole	Mid-Missouri	website, 107 acres, operated by the Missouri Department of Conservation, Missouri habitat exhibits and displays, barn and farm exhibits, aquarium, cave exhibit
Sam A. Baker State Park	Patterson	Wayne	Southeast	5,323 acres, seasonal programs in the nature/visitor center building
Science City at Union Station	Kansas City	Jackson	West Central	Science museum, includes nature center with live animals
Shaw Nature Reserve	Gray Summit	Franklin	East Central	2,400 acres, run by the Missouri Botanical Garden as an extension
Springfield Conservation Nature Center	Springfield	Greene	Southwest	website, 80 acres, operated by the Missouri Department of Conservation
Twin Pines Conservation Education Center	Winona	Shannon	South Central	website, 462 acres, operated by the Missouri Department of Conservation
Weldon Spring Site Interpretive Center	St. Charles	St. Charles	East Central	website, operated by the U.S. Department of Energy, history and clean-up of the Weldon Spring Ordnance Works, 150-acre seeded prairie
Wildcat Glades Conservation and Audubon Center	Joplin	Newton	Southwest	27 acres, partnership project of Audubon Missouri, the City of Joplin and the Missouri Department of Conservation
World Bird Sanctuary	Valley Park	St. Louis	East Central	website, 305 acres, sanctuary for birds of prey, nature center, seasonal shows, nature trails, educational programs and picnic pavilions
