= Prairie Lee Lake =

Reservoir in Missouri, U.S.

- Location within Missouri Location within the United States
- Location: Jackson County, Lee's Summit, Missouri
- Coordinates: 38°56′42″N 94°19′49″W
- Type: reservoir
- Primary inflows: east fork Little Blue River
- Primary outflows: Lake Jacomo
- Basin countries: United States
- Managing agency: Jackson County Parks and Recreation
- First flooded: 1939
- Surface area: 150 acres (0.61 km^{2})
- Surface elevation: 879 ft (268 m)

Prairie Lee Lake is a 150-acre (0.6 km^{2}) freshwater reservoir located in Lee's Summit in Jackson County, Missouri. The lake is managed by Jackson County Parks and Recreation, and is located just south of the 7,809-acre (32 km^{2}) Fleming Park.

== Recreational Activities ==
Activities at the lake including boating, canoeing, and fishing. Common fish include crappie, largemouth bass, and catfish.

== Sources ==
- Prairie Lee Lake Lees Summit
- Prairie Lee Lake MDC
- Physical, Chemical, and Biological Characteristics of Three Reservoirs in West-Central Missouri, 1991-93
