= Missouri Town 1855 =

Missouri Town Living History Museum
- Former name: Missouri Town 1855
- Established: 1964
- Location: Blue Springs, Missouri
- Coordinates: 38.973710°N 94.300855°W
- Type: Living History Museum
- Website: Missouri Town - Jackson County Parks & Rec

Missouri Town Living History Museum is a 30-acre (120,000 m^{2}) outdoor history museum located in Fleming Park east of Lake Jacomo in Jackson County, Missouri. It is owned and operated by Jackson County Parks + Rec.

== Site description ==
Missouri Town Living History Museum consists of more than 25 structures, most dating from before the Civil War (1820 to 1860). This antebellum open-air museum shows 19th-century lifestyle using interpreters dressed in period attire, the growing of various crops of the era, along with livestock (many rare).

Missouri Town was never an actual town. It is a representation of a mid-19th-century Missouri town, consisting of buildings moved from other locations in Missouri. Buildings include:

- Barns (c. 1840, 1848, 1855, 1860)
- Chicken Coop (c. 1830–1850)
- Church (c. 1844)
- Herb Shed (Unknown)
- Hog Shed (c. 1838)
- Law Office (c. 1880)
- Luttrell Cabin (c. 1860)
- Marsh House (c. 1841–1855)
- Riffie House (c. 1844)
- Schoolhouse (c. 1860)
- Smokehouses (c. 1830, 1850)
- Summer Kitchen (c. 1842–1843)
- Tavern (c. 1822)
- Webb House (c. 1848)
- Withers House (1842)
- Woodard Workshop (c. 1837)

Several buildings are reproductions using materials salvaged from other period structures, such as the Mercantile (c. 1973) and Blacksmith Shop (c. 1970) .

The Root Cellar is the only building original to the property, having belonged to the farm that owned the site before being purchased by Jackson County Parks + Rec.

== Programs and activities ==
There are workshops available from spring to fall. The official website should be referenced for details, as they vary from year to year.

== Friends of Missouri Town 1855 ==
The Friends is a non-profit group formed shortly after the site opened, passionate about the history of the site and its legacy. They provide many talents to the village: including sewing, dying, candle making, cider pressing, weaving, etc.

== See also ==
- Historical reenactment
- List of tourist attractions providing reenactment
- Living history
