= Blue Springs, Missouri =

City in Jackson County, Missouri, United States

- City
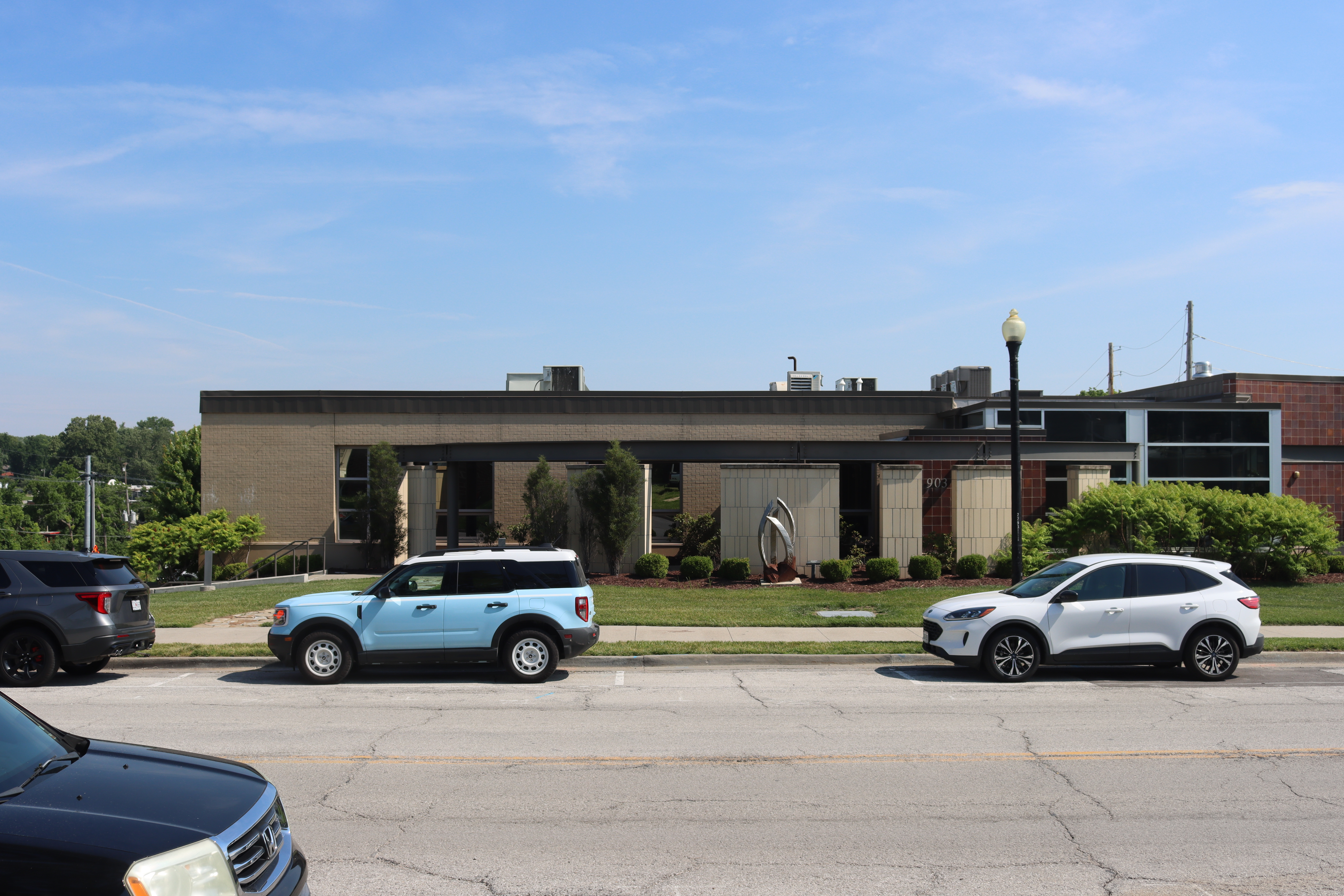
- City Hall
- Motto: City of Cooperation
- Location of Blue Springs, Missouri
- Coordinates: 39°1′4″N 94°16′28″W
- Country: United States
- State: Missouri
- County: Jackson
- Incorporated: 1880
- Founded: 1838

Government
  - Mayor: Chris Lievsay
  - City Clerk: Sheryl Morgan
  - City Administrator: Christine Cates
  - City Attorney: Sarah Carnes

Area
  - Total: 22.70 sq mi (58.79 km^{2})
  - Land: 22.46 sq mi (58.17 km^{2})
  - Water: 0.077 sq mi (0.20 km^{2})
- Elevation: 974 ft (297 m)

Population (2020)
  - Total: 58,603
  - Estimate (2024): 61,246
  - Density: 2,609.3/sq mi (1,007.45/km^{2})
- Time zone: UTC−6 (Central (CST))
  - Summer (DST): UTC−5 (CDT)
- ZIP codes: 64013-64015, 64029, 64064
- Area codes: 816, 975
- FIPS code: 29-06652
- GNIS feature ID: 0714434
- Website: bluespringsgov.com

Blue Springs is a city in Jackson County, Missouri, United States. Blue Springs is a large suburb located east of Kansas City. It is the eighth-most populous city in the Kansas City metropolitan area and the tenth-most populous city in Missouri. As of the 2020 census, the population was 58,604.

== History ==
As early as 1825, a spring of water flowing from the side of a hill and falling into a tributary of Little Blue River was used by campers, traders, and many wagons starting on the Santa Fe expeditions. They met here before crossing the plains. The spring was named Blue Springs by freighters freighting provisions to the Harmony Mission, on the Marais de Cygnes River in Bates County Missouri, from Lexington, Missouri in Lafayette County.

The presence of water and a need for supplies led to the construction of a grist mill and a permanent settlement of Blue Springs near the spring. The original town site of Blue Springs and the spring for which Blue Springs was named was located near what became Burrus Old Mill Park.

An early settler, Franklin Smith, arrived in Blue Springs from Virginia in 1838, and became a leading figure in the community's development. He established the first post office in 1845, naming it after the well-known springs.

The settlement continued to grow near the springs until March 1878, when the Chicago and Alton Railroad announced plans to build a station about one mile east of the original settlement. To take advantage of the commerce the railroad would bring, the town moved its center to the site of the new station and continued its development as a rural trading center. The Chicago & Alton Hotel built in 1878 is the oldest business in the city.

The Jackson County Court granted the incorporation of Blue Springs as a town on September 7, 1880, making it the fourth settlement in the county to be incorporated. On January 12, 1904, Blue Springs was incorporated as a 4th class city. Blue Springs adopted a Constitutional Charter and became Home Rule Charter City in April 1994.

The former Bank of Blue Springs was established in 1883. It had a capital surplus of $50,000 in 1926. The location of the Bank of Blue Springs is known today as America's Community Bank.

== Geography ==
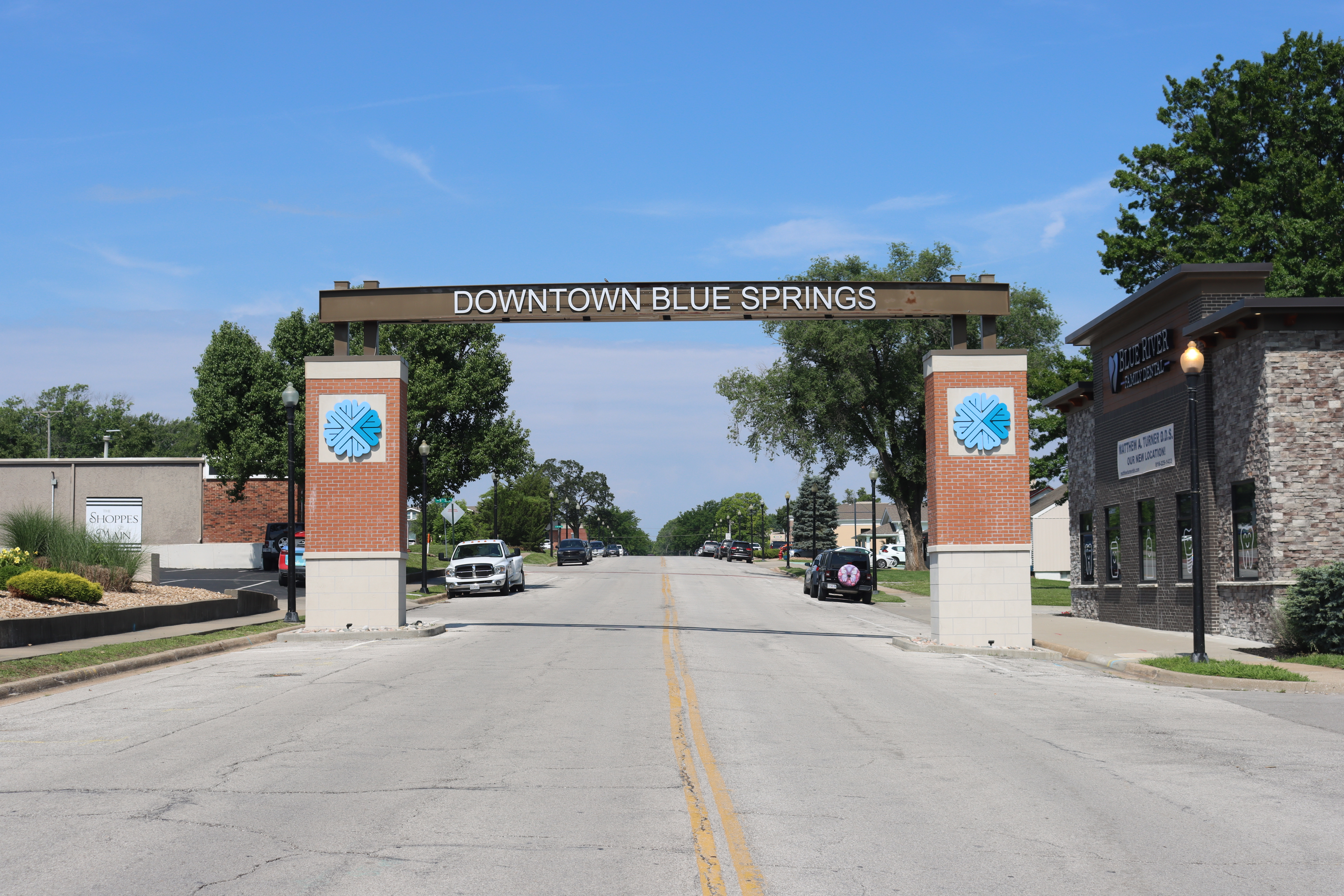
The entrance archway to downtown

According to the United States Census Bureau, the city has a total area of 22.35 square miles (57.89 km^{2}), of which 22.27 square miles (57.68 km^{2}) is land and 0.08 square miles (0.21 km^{2}) is water.

=== Climate ===
Blue Springs experiences a colder variation of a four-season humid subtropical climate (Köppen climate classification Cfa) with mild days and cold nights during the winter, and hot days and muggy nights during the summer.

Climate data for Blue Springs, MO
Month	Jan	Feb	Mar	Apr	May	Jun	Jul	Aug	Sep	Oct	Nov	Dec	Year
Record high °F (°C)	73 (23)	80 (27)	87 (31)	91 (33)	91 (33)	103 (39)	108 (42)	107 (42)	105 (41)	95 (35)	82 (28)	73 (23)	108 (42)
Mean daily maximum °F (°C)	41 (5)	46 (8)	53 (12)	63 (17)	74 (23)	82 (28)	87 (31)	86 (30)	78 (26)	68 (20)	51 (11)	44 (7)	64 (18)
Mean daily minimum °F (°C)	23 (−5)	26 (−3)	37 (3)	45 (7)	53 (12)	61 (16)	66 (19)	64 (18)	55 (13)	44 (7)	35 (2)	26 (−3)	45 (7)
Record low °F (°C)	−19 (−28)	−15 (−26)	−5 (−21)	11 (−12)	28 (−2)	35 (2)	48 (9)	43 (6)	29 (−2)	7 (−14)	−3 (−19)	−25 (−32)	−25 (−32)
Average precipitation inches (mm)	1.30 (33)	1.51 (38)	2.81 (71)	3.78 (96)	5.06 (129)	5.47 (139)	4.19 (106)	3.82 (97)	4.89 (124)	3.54 (90)	2.95 (75)	1.86 (47)	41.18 (1,046)

== Demographics ==
Historical population
Census	Pop.	Note	%±
1880	129		—
1890	506		292.2%
1900	468		−7.5%
1910	561		19.9%
1920	551		−1.8%
1930	706		28.1%
1940	788		11.6%
1950	1,068		35.5%
1960	2,555		139.2%
1970	6,779		165.3%
1980	25,936		282.6%
1990	40,153		54.8%
2000	48,080		19.7%
2010	52,575		9.3%
2020	58,603		11.5%
2026 (est.)	62,252		6.2%
U.S. Decennial Census

=== Racial and ethnic composition ===
Blue Springs city, Missouri – Racial and ethnic composition Note: the US Census treats Hispanic/Latino as an ethnic category. This table excludes Latinos from the racial categories and assigns them to a separate category. Hispanics/Latinos may be of any race.
Race / Ethnicity (NH = Non-Hispanic)	Pop 2000	Pop 2010	Pop 2020	% 2000	% 2010	% 2020
White alone (NH)	44,045	44,463	44,912	91.61%	84.57%	76.64%
Black or African American alone (NH)	1,395	3,185	4,475	2.90%	6.06%	7.64%
Native American or Alaska Native alone (NH)	183	205	233	0.38%	0.39%	0.40%
Asian alone (NH)	456	652	864	0.95%	1.24%	1.47%
Native Hawaiian or Pacific Islander alone (NH)	49	82	111	0.10%	0.16%	0.19%
Other race alone (NH)	31	60	177	0.06%	0.11%	0.30%
Mixed race or Multiracial (NH)	592	1,310	3,929	1.23%	2.49%	6.70%
Hispanic or Latino (any race)	1,329	2,618	3,902	2.76%	4.98%	6.66%
Total	48,080	52,575	58,603	100.00%	100.00%	100.00%

=== 2020 census ===
As of the 2020 census, Blue Springs had a population of 58,603 and 21,735 households, including 15,319 families, with a population density of 2,609.2 per square mile (1,007.4/km^{2}).

The median age was 36.4 years. 26.8% of residents were under the age of 18 and 14.6% were 65 years of age or older. For every 100 females there were 93.6 males, and for every 100 females age 18 and over there were 90.3 males age 18 and over.

99.6% of residents lived in urban areas, while 0.4% lived in rural areas.

Of the households, 38.0% had children under the age of 18 living in them. Of all households, 52.2% were married-couple households, 15.4% were households with a male householder and no spouse or partner present, and 25.4% were households with a female householder and no spouse or partner present. About 22.3% of all households were made up of individuals and 9.0% had someone living alone who was 65 years of age or older. The average household size was 2.7 and the average family size was 3.1.

There were 22,687 housing units, of which 4.2% were vacant. The homeowner vacancy rate was 1.3% and the rental vacancy rate was 6.3%.

Racial composition as of the 2020 census
Race	Number	Percent
White	45,989	78.5%
Black or African American	4,567	7.8%
American Indian and Alaska Native	315	0.5%
Asian	880	1.5%
Native Hawaiian and Other Pacific Islander	117	0.2%
Some other race	1,184	2.0%
Two or more races	5,551	9.5%

The 2016–2020 5-year American Community Survey estimates show that the median household income was $72,846 (with a margin of error of +/- $3,765) and the median family income was $83,058 (+/- $4,396). Males had a median income of $50,007 (+/- $2,780) versus $34,538 (+/- $2,432) for females. The median income for those above 16 years old was $41,436 (+/- $1,423). Approximately, 4.2% of families and 4.9% of the population were below the poverty line, including 5.7% of those under the age of 18 and 6.3% of those ages 65 or over.

=== 2010 census ===
As of the census of 2010, there were 52,575 people, 19,522 households, and 14,468 families residing in the city. The population density was 2,360.8 inhabitants per square mile (911.5/km^{2}). There were 20,643 housing units at an average density of 926.9 per square mile (357.9/km^{2}). The racial makeup of the city was 87.6% White, 6.2% African American, 0.5% Native American, 1.2% Asian, 0.2% Pacific Islander, 1.3% from other races, and 3.1% from two or more races. Hispanic or Latino of any race were 5.0% of the population.

There were 19,522 households, of which 40.4% had children under the age of 18 living with them, 55.3% were married couples living together, 13.7% had a female householder with no husband present, 5.1% had a male householder with no wife present, and 25.9% were non-families. 20.4% of all households were made up of individuals, and 5.8% had someone living alone who was 65 years of age or older. The average household size was 2.68 and the average family size was 3.09.

The median age in the city was 34.7 years. 27.9% of residents were under the age of 18; 8.6% were between the ages of 18 and 24; 27.8% were from 25 to 44; 26.4% were from 45 to 64; and 9.4% were 65 years of age or older. The gender makeup of the city was 48.5% male and 51.5% female.

=== 2000 census ===
As of the census of 2000, there were 48,080 people, 17,286 households, and 13,362 families residing in the city. The population density was 2,642.7 inhabitants per square mile (1,020.4/km^{2}). There were 17,733 housing units at an average density of 974.7 per square mile (376.3/km^{2}). The racial makeup of the city was 93.18% White, 2.93% African American, 0.43% Native American, 0.97% Asian, 0.11% Pacific Islander, 0.83% from other races, and 1.55% from two or more races. Hispanic or Latino of any race were 2.76% of the population.

There were 17,286 households, out of which 42.5% had children under the age of 18 living with them, 63.1% were married couples living together, 10.5% had a female householder with no husband present, and 22.7% were non-families. 18.1% of all households were made up of individuals, and 4.8% had someone living alone who was 65 years of age or older. The average household size was 2.77 and the average family size was 3.16. In the city the population was spread out, with 29.5% under the age of 18, 8.7% from 18 to 24, 31.9% from 25 to 44, 22.8% from 45 to 64, and 7.1% who were 65 years of age or older. The median age was 33 years. For every 100 females, there were 95.8 males. For every 100 females age 18 and over, there were 92.3 males. The median income for a household in the city was $55,402, and the median income for a family was $61,008. Males had a median income of $41,373 versus $29,688 for females. The per capita income for the city was $23,444. About 3.9% of families and 4.8% of the population were below the poverty line, including 6.0% of those under age 18 and 5.9% of those age 65 or over.

== Economy ==
=== Top employers ===
According to the town's 2022 Comprehensive Annual Financial Report, the top employers in the city are:

#	Employer	# of Employees
1	Blue Springs School District	2147
2	Hy-Vee	592
3	St. Mary's Hospital of Blue Springs	532
4	Faurecia Interiors Systems Inc	500
5	Wal-Mart Stores, Inc.	426
6	Fike Corporation	414
7	City of Blue Springs	312
8	Price Chopper	311
9	Target	300
10	St. Mary's Villages	206

== Arts and culture ==
Mid-Continent Public Library operates two library branches in Blue Springs.

Missouri Town 1855 is located nearby.

== Parks and recreation ==
Fleming Park consists of Blue Springs Lake and Lake Jacomo. Fleming Park's total land area is 7,809-acre (32 km^{2}) of which 1,690-acre (7 km^{2}) is water.

Blue Springs Field House is located here.

== Government ==
The City of Blue Springs has a Mayor-Council-Administrator form of government as set forth in the Home Rule City Charter. The City Council is the governing body of the city, elected by the public. The City Administrator is appointed by the City Council and is responsible for the implementation of policies and decisions made by the mayor and city council. The elected governing body is composed of a mayor and six councilpersons.

== Education ==
Blue Springs is served by three public schools districts:

- Blue Springs R-IV School District (the vast majority of the municipality)
- Lee's Summit R-VII School District
- Grain Valley R-V School District

Private schools:

- Timothy Lutheran Schools, K-8, North Campus
- St. John Lalande Catholic School, K-8
- Plaza Heights Christian Academy, PreK-12

Metropolitan Community College has the Blue Springs, Grain Valley, and Lee's Summit school districts in its in-district taxation area.

== Media ==
- The Examiner, Eastern Jackson County Daily Newspaper. Also known as the Blue Springs Examiner
- The Kansas City Star
- The Blue Springs Magazine

== Infrastructure ==
=== Transportation ===
- Interstate 70 - Major east–west interstate highway, connecting Blue Springs to Kansas City, Columbia, and St. Louis
- US 40 -Connects Kansas City to Independence and then enters Blue Springs at Bolin Road to the west, then east of Adams Dairy Parkway enters Grain Valley.
- Route 7 - Links U.S. 24 Hwy with Blue Springs by first traveling through Independence entering Blue Springs at Pink Hill Road and is the main north/south Highway through Blue Springs, leaving Blue Springs at Colbern Road and entering Lake Lotawana then Pleasant Hill and Harrisonville.
- Adams Dairy Parkway is an important trafficway that runs from the north to south through Blue Springs.

=== Public safety ===
- The city has a municipal police department.
- Fire and ambulance service for most of Blue Springs is performed by Central Jackson County Fire Protection District. The department was formed in 1961 and is an Accredited Fire Agency by the Commission on Fire Accreditation International.

== Notable people ==
- Doug Terry - Former NFL player for the Kansas City Chiefs
- Ladell Betts - Former NFL player for the Washington Redskins and the New Orleans Saints
- Khristian Boyd, NFL defensive tackle for the New Orleans Saints
- Donald Stephenson - Former NFL player for the Kansas City Chiefs, Denver Broncos, and the Cleveland Browns
- Jimmy Redmond - Former NFL player for the Jacksonville Jaguars
- Brandon Lloyd - NFL player for San Francisco 49ers
- Khalil Davis - NFL player for the Tampa Bay Buccaneers
- Carlos Davis - NFL player for the Pittsburgh Steelers
- Darrius Shepherd - NFL player for the Green Bay Packers
- Elijah Lee - NFL player for the Detroit Lions
- Deiondre' Hall - NFL player for the Tampa Bay Buccaneers
- Jim Eisenreich - Former MLB player for Twins, Royals, Phillies, and Marlins and 1997 World Series champion
- Nick Tepesch - MLB player for the Texas Rangers, Los Angeles Dodgers, Minnesota Twins, and Toronto Blue Jays.
- Terry Gautreaux - Taekwondo, bronze medalist in 1992 Summer Olympics
- Steve Harris - NBA player and University of Tulsa basketball standout
- Jon Sundvold - NBA player and University of Missouri basketball standout
- Jeff Mittie - women's basketball head coach, Kansas State
- Ivana Hong - alternate Olympic gymnast, Beijing 2008
- Terin Humphrey - Olympic gymnast, Athens 2004
- Tonya Knight - IFBB professional bodybuilder
- Courtney McCool - Olympic gymnast, Athens 2004
- Josh Watson - NFL Player for the Carolina Panthers
- Justin Pitts - Professional Basketball player for HLA Alicante of the Spanish LEB Plata.
- Kendall Blanton - NFL player for the Los Angeles Rams
- David Cook - winner of American Idol Season 7
- Jacob Misiorowski - MLB player for the Milwaukee Brewers, and 2026 World Series champion

== See also ==
- List of cities in Missouri
