= Blue Springs Lake =

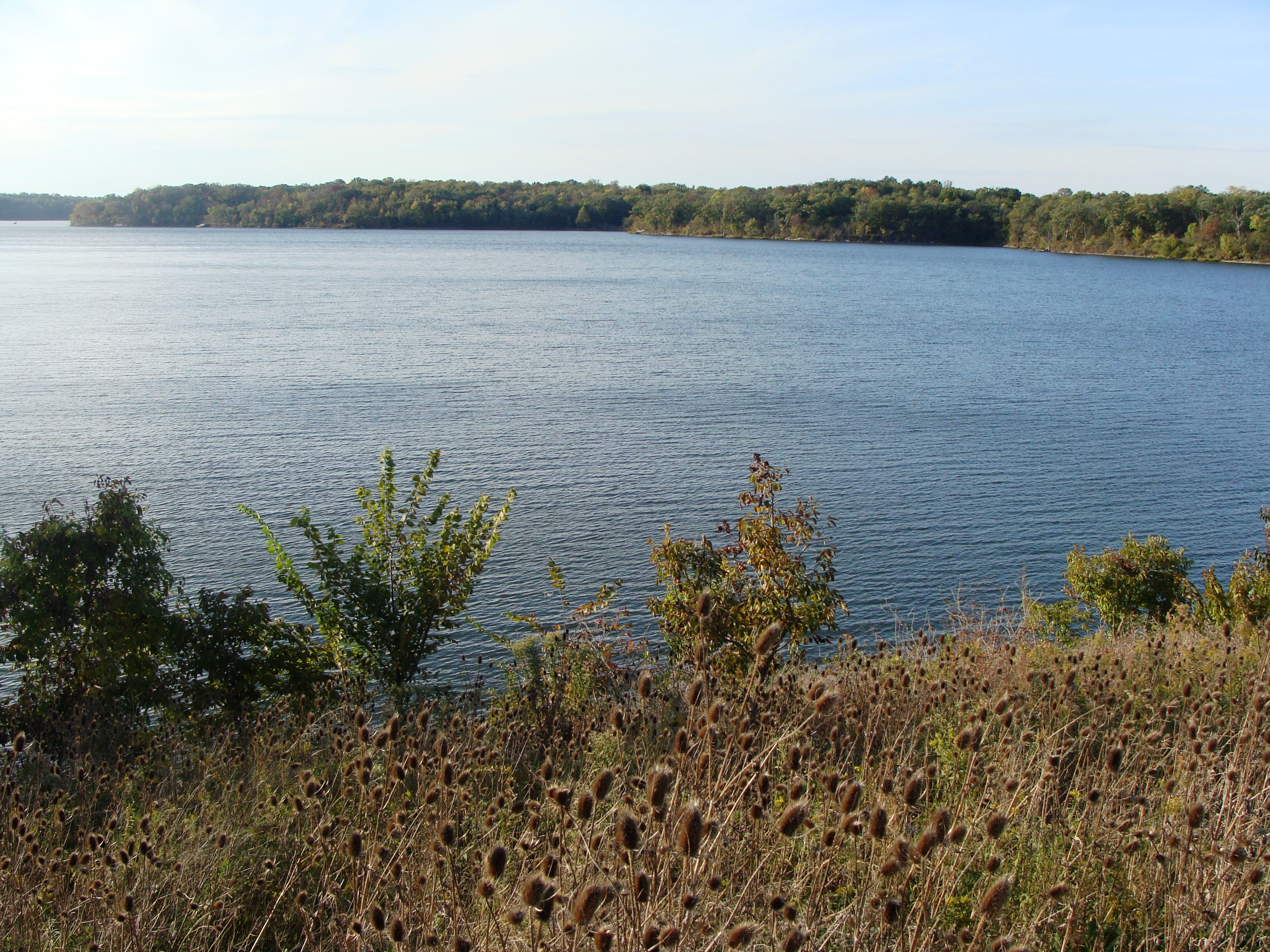

- Location within Missouri Location within the United States
- Location: Jackson County, near Blue Springs, Missouri
- Coordinates: 39°00′58″N 94°20′21″W
- Type: reservoir
- Primary inflows: Lake Jacomo
- Primary outflows: east fork Little Blue River
- Basin countries: United States
- Managing agency: Jackson County Parks and Recreation
- Built: 1982-1988
- Surface area: 720 acres (290 ha)
- Surface elevation: 801 ft (244 m)
- Frozen: minimally in some coves

Blue Springs Lake is a 720-acre (2.9 km^{2}) freshwater reservoir located near Blue Springs in Jackson County, Missouri.

The lake is located in the 7,809-acre (32 km^{2}) Fleming Park, which is managed by Jackson County Parks and Recreation.

== Recreational Activities ==
Activities at the lake including power boating, water skiing, tubing and jet skiing. Common fish include bluegill, largemouth bass, hybrid striped bass, carp, and catfish.
