= Silesian Park =

Public park in Chorzów, Poland

Coordinates: 50.287296°N 18.991199°E

Silesian Culture and Recreation Park
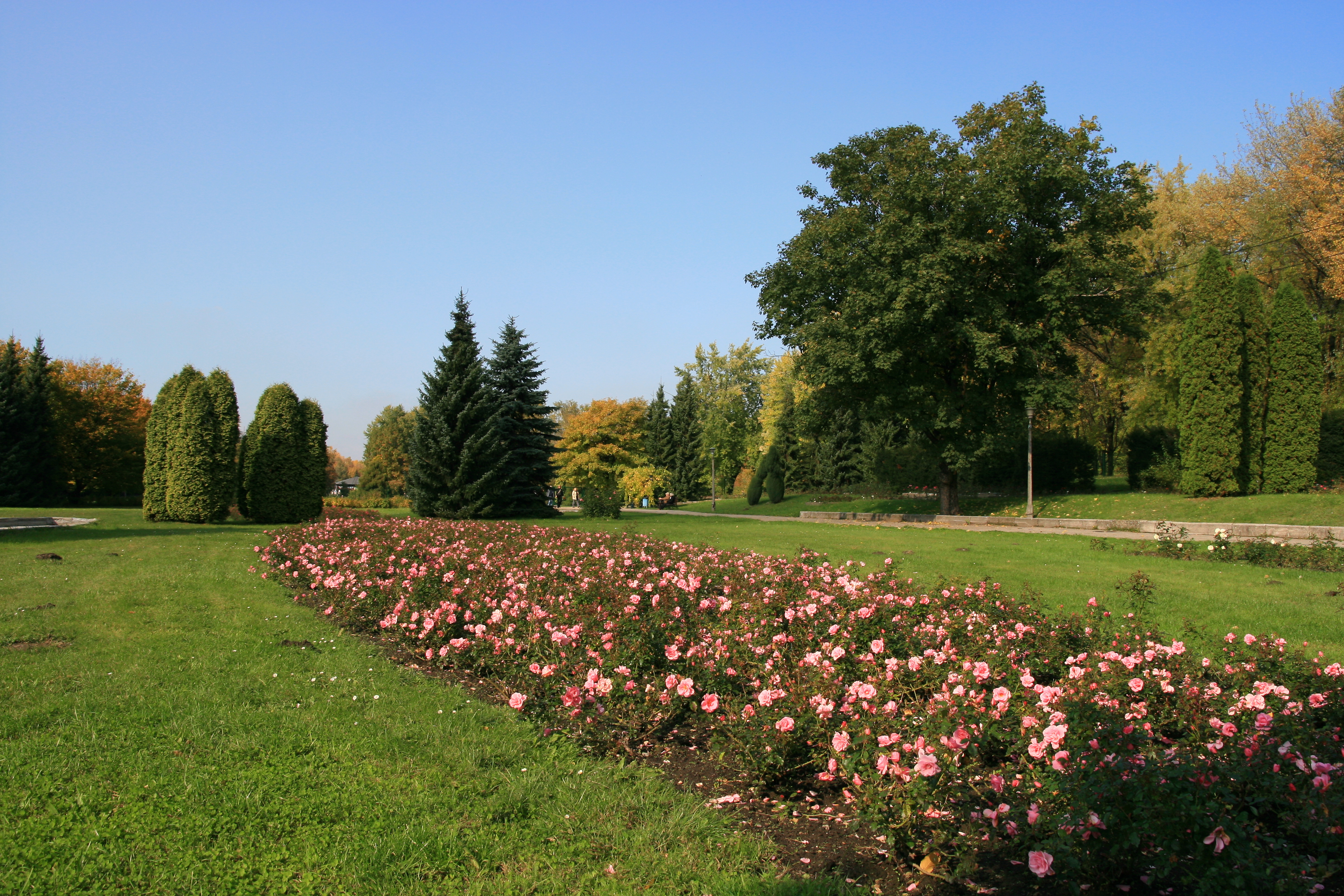
- Japanese Garden within Silesian Park
- Interactive map of Silesian Culture and Recreation Park
- Type: Urban park
- Location: Chorzów, Upper Silesia, Poland
- Area: 620 hectares (1,532.1 acres); 6.2 square kilometres (2.4 sq mi)
- Created: 1950s/1960s
- Status: Open all year
- Website: www.parkslaski.pl

Silesian Park (Polish: Park Śląski) (Silesian: Park Ślōnski) is a recreation complex in the center of the Metropolis GZM, located in Chorzów in Upper Silesia, Poland. Silesian Park is managed by WPKiW S.A.

The area of the park is 620 hectares, twice as large as the Central Park in New York. Until 2012, the park was known under its formal name of "General Jerzy Ziętek Voivodeship Park of Culture and Recreation" (Wojewódzki Park Kultury i Wypoczynku im. gen. Jerzego Ziętka, abbreviated WPKiW), named after Jerzy Ziętek, a Silesian politician who headed the 1950s initiative to create this park.

It restored an industrially devastated piece of land in the middle of a highly urbanized area. As a result of the exchange of land during the construction of the Millennium district in Katowice in 1990s, the Silesian Park is entirely located within the administrative boundaries of Chorzów. However, it does not belong to any of its districts which emphasizes its regional character.

== History ==
One of the main initiators of the creation of the park was General Jerzy Ziętek. The decision to build this largest ecological investment in Upper Silesia was made in 1950 at a meeting of the Provincial National Council in Katowice. The investment area included 75% of devastated post-industrial areas: heaps, post-mining waste, poor shafts, sinkholes, swamps, landfills, as well as agricultural wastelands with an area of about 640 ha on the territory of Chorzów and Katowice. Due to the low usefulness of local acidic podzolic soils, 3.5 million m^{3} of land was brought to the area of the current park and 0.5 million m^{3} of humus soils and peat were transported.

Construction began in July 1951. It was carried out in large part through social deeds. Monetary donations were also collected. The basic assumption that guided the design of the park by the team of architects was to divide it into two zones using the existing topographic system. The central part of the park was designed as a forest area, crossed by a network of roads, alleys and pedestrian routes to promote silence, passive rest and active physical recreation. The remaining part of the park, about 13 ha in total, was designed as cultural and recreational areas and areas conducive to active recreation, where additional attractions were to be built and festivities were to be organized.

In the 1950s and 1960s, further investments were carried out in the park: a stadium, a zoo, an amusement park and a planetarium. In 1957, a more than 5-kilometer narrow gauge railway route was launched, and in 1967 – the "Elka" cable car. In 1966, the "Fala" swimming pool was put into use, and in 1968 the "Kapelusz" exhibition hall was opened. In 1975, the Upper Silesian Ethnographic Park was created, and in 2007 the Rope Park "Palenisko" was created.

In 2013, at Klonowa Avenue, Chorzów-Park sanitary helipad was put into operation.

== Points of interest ==
In addition to the extensive green area, the following are located in the park:

- Silesian Stadium – multifunctional sports stadium, once home to Poland national football team. Reconstructed in 2017 for a total cost of c. 155 million €
- "Elka" cable car – consisting of three triangular lines between 1967 and 2007; new line is in operation since 2013, and a second line is in construction, with third in future plans to revive the triangular aspect.
- Silesian Zoological Garden – opened in 1954
- Silesian Planetarium
- Silesian Amusement Park
- Upper Silesian Ethnographic Park
- Katowice International Fair Grounds
- Stadium of GKS Katowice
- Shooting range
- a swimming-pool complex
- a water sports center
- tennis courts
- the rose garden
- The Technical Progress Centre
- a hotel complex, the Polish Tourist' Society and the Polish Scouts' Association district centers, restaurants, cafés and show pavilions where flower shows and other exhibits are held.

== Gallery ==
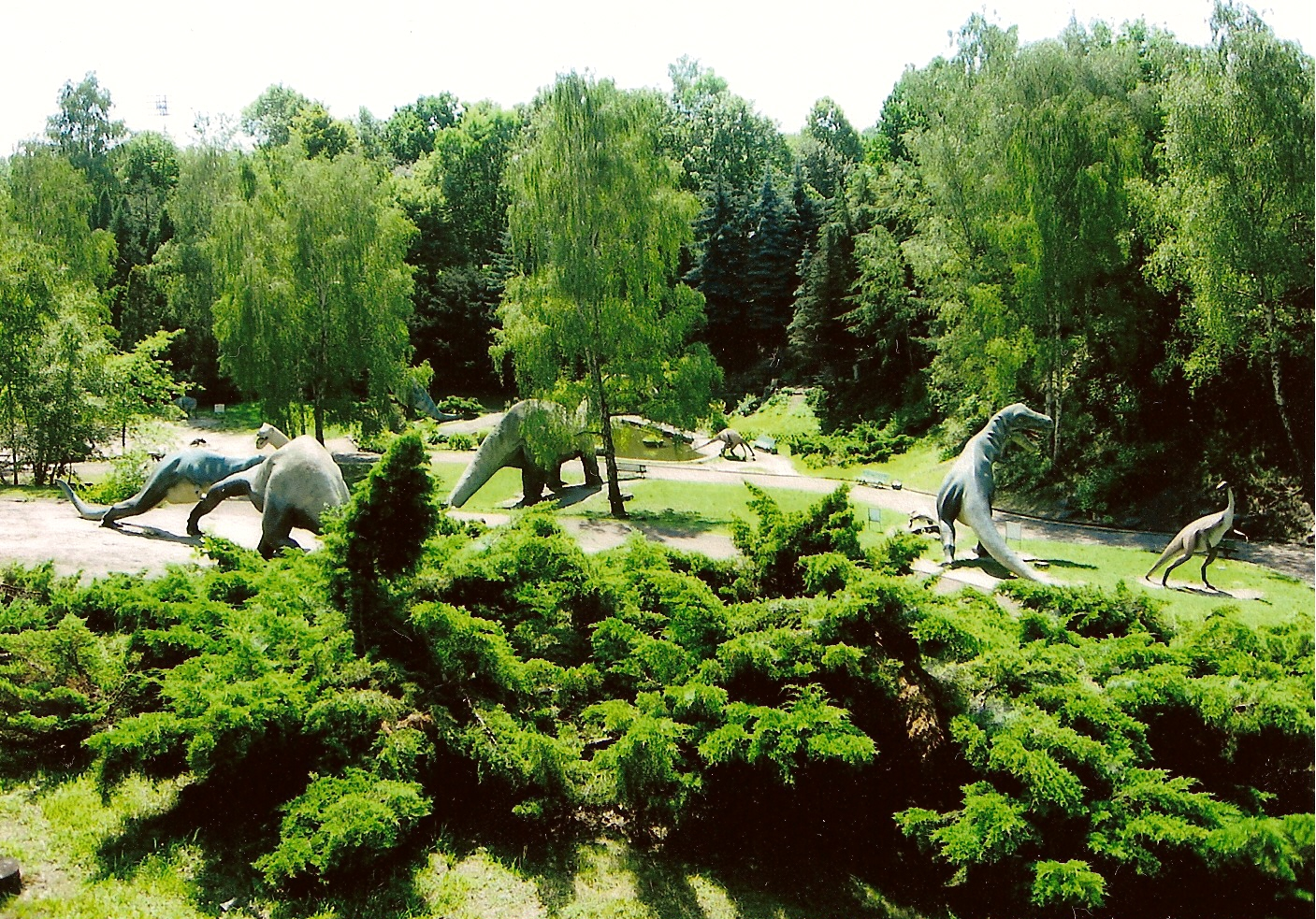
The Dinosaurs Valley in Silesian Zoological Garden (reconstructions of prehistoric reptiles)

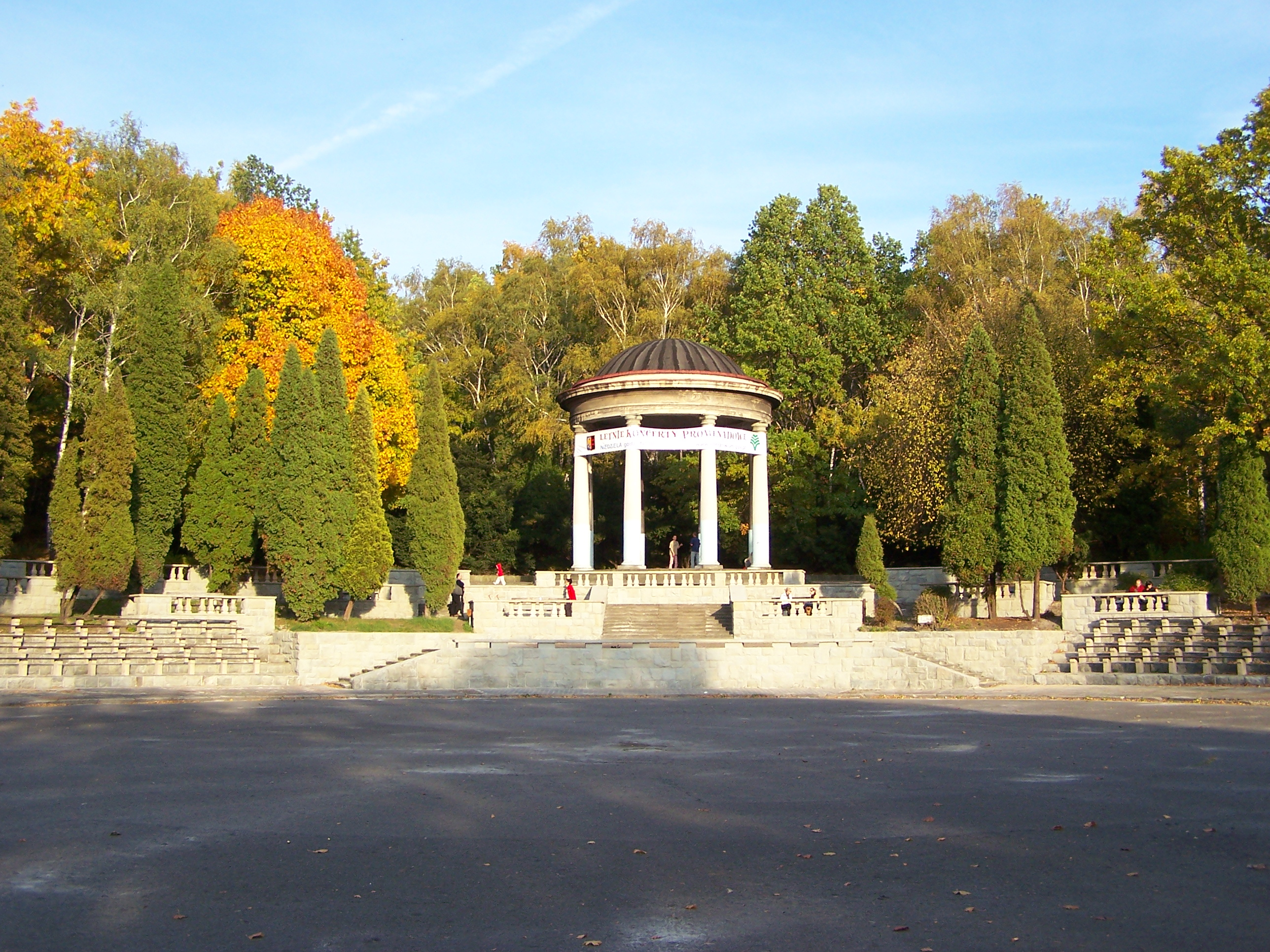
Dance circle in the Voivodeship Park of Culture and Recreation

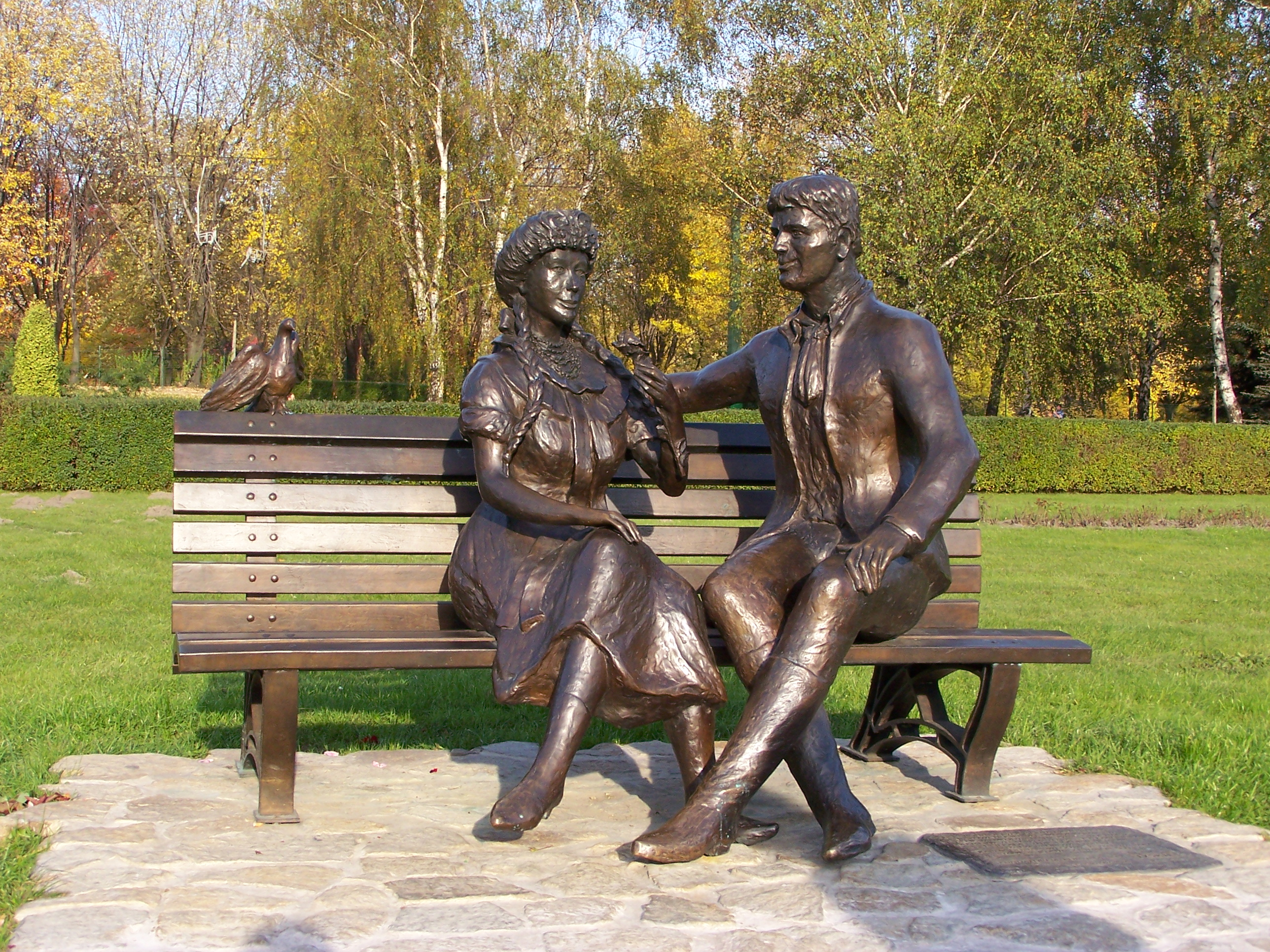
One of the many sculptures within Silesian Park

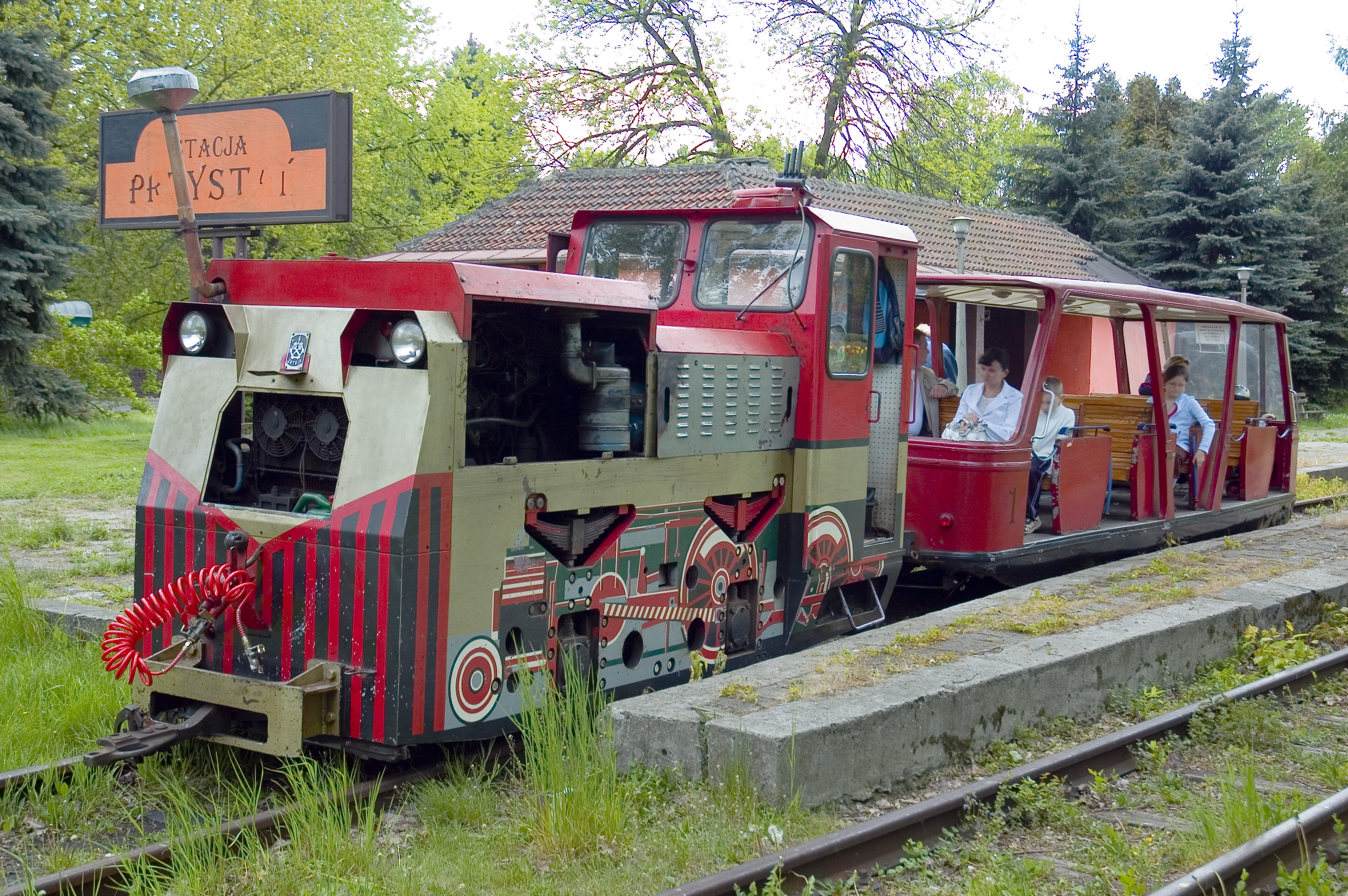
Park railway in the Silesian Culture and Recreation Park (WLp50 locomotive)

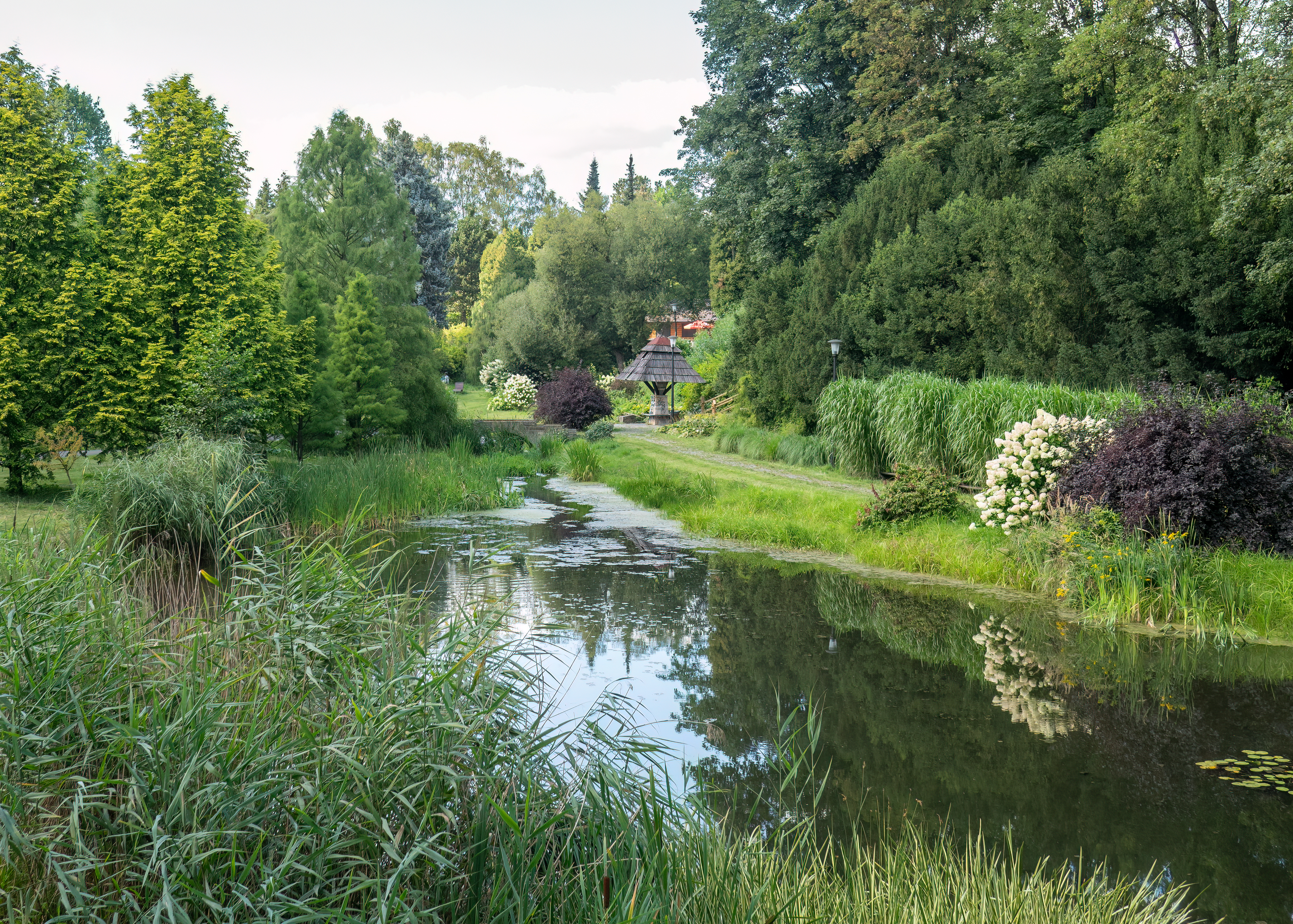
Quiet Corner (Cichy Zakątek)

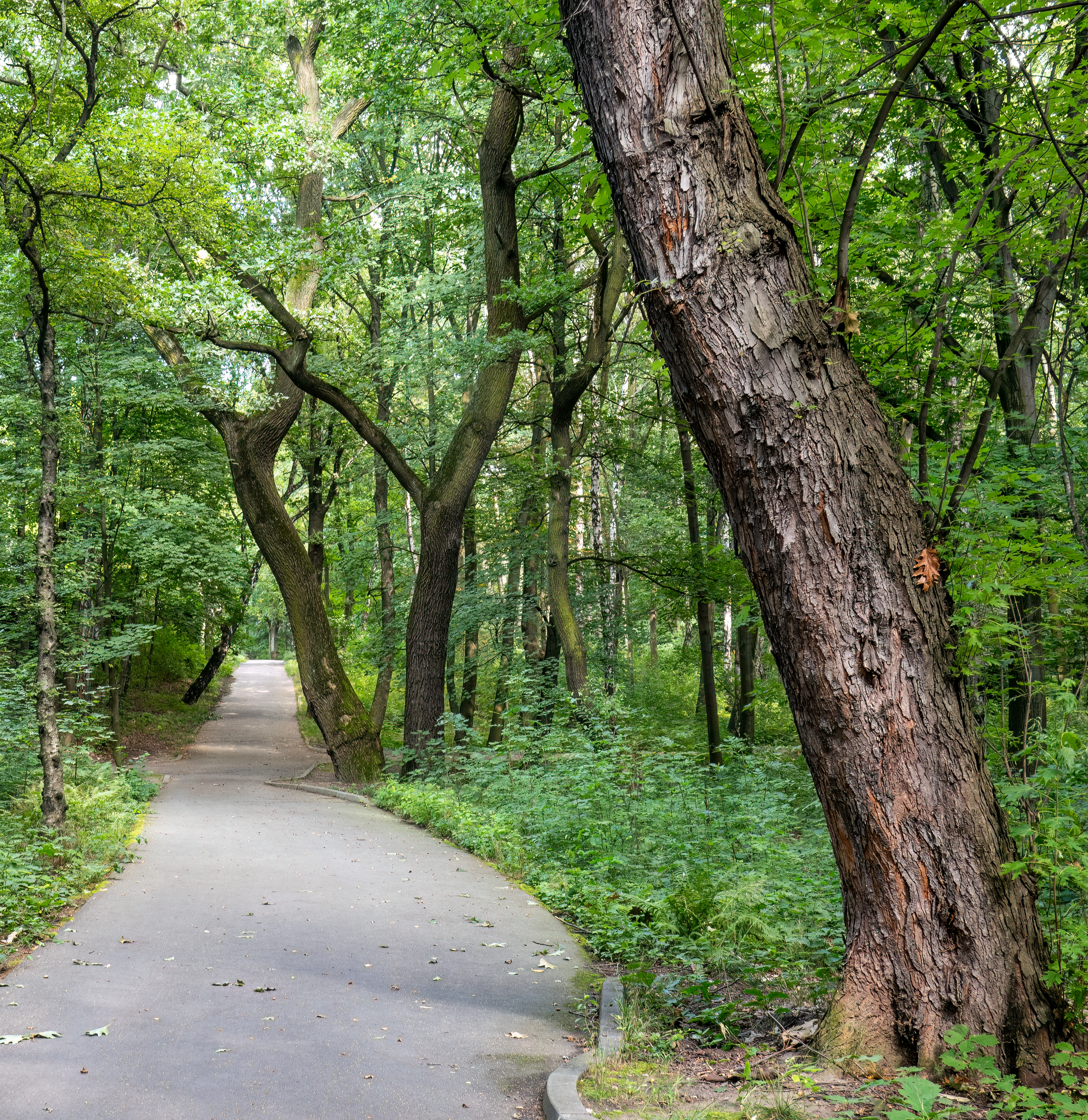
Path through the woods
