= Government of Dallas =

City government of Dallas, Texas, US

The government in Dallas, Texas is primarily vested in the Dallas City Council, Mayor, and City Manager. There is also the Dallas Police Department, Dallas Fire-Rescue, and the Dallas municipal courts. In the 2006–2007 fiscal year, the city's total budget was $2.3 billion.

== Organization ==
=== City Council, Mayor and City Manager ===

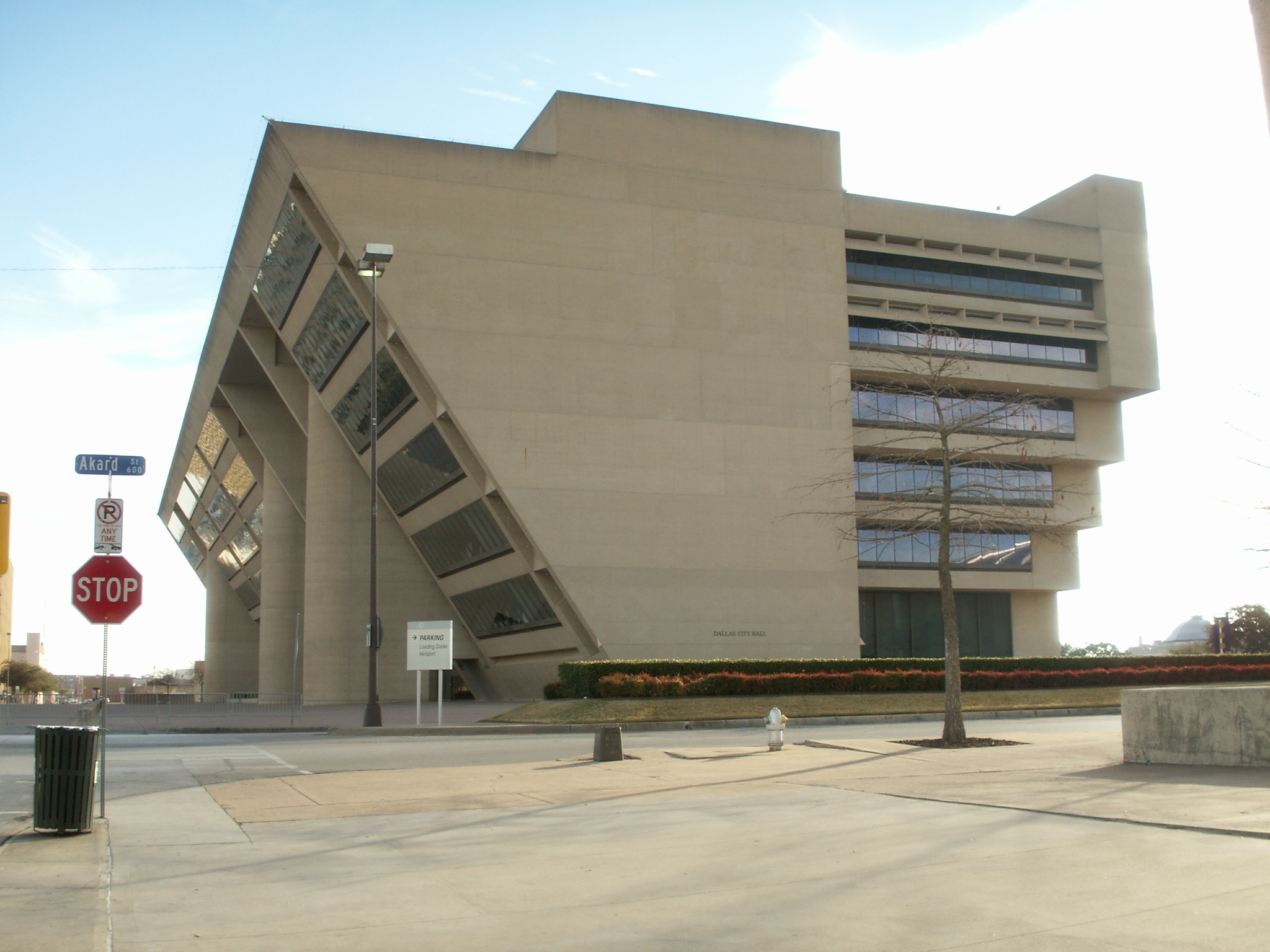
Dallas City Hall

The city uses a council-manager government with Eric Johnson serving as mayor, Kim Tolbert as city manager, and 14 council members serving as representatives to the 14 council districts in the city. This organizational structure was recently contested by some in favor of a strong-mayor city charter only to be rejected by Dallas voters.

Kimberly Tolbert is credited with the 2026 decision to sell the Dallas City Hall building, and the decision to force City employees to take mandatory furlough days in the 2025-2026 & 2026-2027 fiscal years.

=== Police Department ===
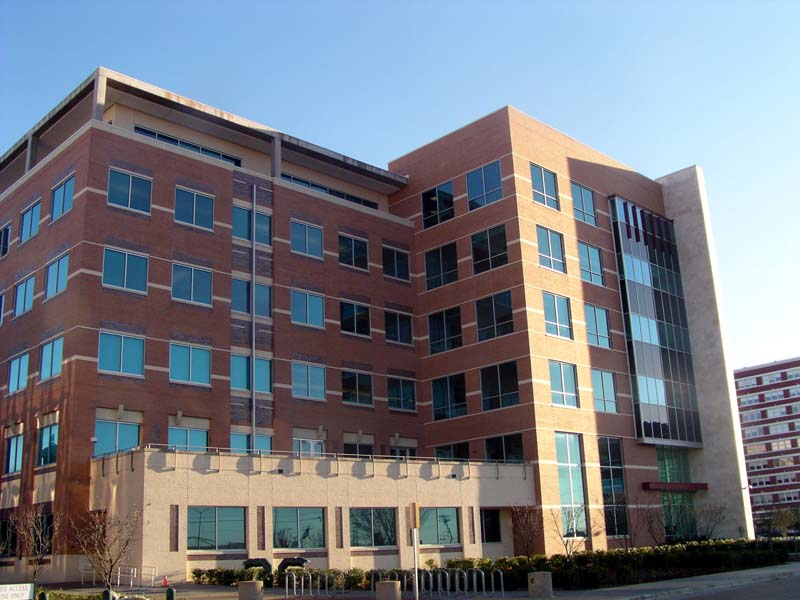
The Dallas Police Department headquarters in the Cedars neighborhood.

Policing in Dallas is provided predominantly by the Dallas Police Department, which has around 3,100 officers. The Dallas chief of police is Edgardo "Eddie" Garcia (effective February 3, 2021). The Police Headquarters are located in the Cedars neighborhood of South Dallas.

=== Fire-Rescue ===
Fire protection and emergency medical services in the city are provided by the Dallas Fire-Rescue Department, which has 1,670 firefighters and 56 working fire stations in the city limits. The Dallas Fire & Rescue chief is Dominique Artis. The department also operates the Dallas Firefighter's Museum at Dallas's oldest remaining fire station, built in 1907, along Parry Avenue near Fair Park.

The city of Dallas is protected 24/7, 365 by the 1,670 paid, full-time firefighters of the city of Dallas Fire-Rescue Department (DFD), providing both fire protection and emergency medical service to the city. The Dallas Fire-Rescue Department operates out of 57 Fire Stations in 2 Divisions of 9 Battalions, located throughout the city, and maintain and operate a fire apparatus fleet of 57 Engines, 21 Trucks, 40 Rescues, 3 Peak Demand Rescues, 1 Haz-Mat. Unit, 2 Haz-Mat. Teams, 2 Urban Search and Rescue Units, 9 Brush/Booster Units, 1 Marine Unit (based on Lake Ray Hubbard), 7 smaller Fireboats, 1 Swift Water Rescue Unit, and numerous other special, support, and reserve units. All DFD Paramedics are Firefighters, but not all Firefighters are Paramedics; but are trained to at least EMT-Basic. EMT-Paramedics and EMT-B's are trained through the University of Texas Southwestern Medical Center at Dallas. The department also operates the Dallas Firefighter's Museum at Dallas' oldest remaining fire station, built in 1907, along Parry Avenue near Fair Park. In addition, the department operates in mutual aid agreements with several surrounding municipalities.

In 1995, the Dallas Fire Department Training Academy (now the Chief Dodd Miller Training Academy) began to host firefighter recruits from other Metroplex municipalities in its 22-week basic firefighter training school, effectively becoming a regional training center. The Academy is reverently known as "The Drill Tower" by instructors and graduates, referring to the facility's most taxing structure/activity, a six story tower whose staircase is routinely climbed three times in rapid succession by recruits in full gear and high-rise hose packs.

- Battalion 1 is located at Fire Station #4; Battalion 2 is located at Fire Station #7; Battalion 3 is located at Fire Station #8; Battalion 4 is located at Fire Station #28; Battalion 5 is located at Fire Station #25; Battalion 6 is located at Fire Station #14; Battalion 7 is located at Fire Station #35; Battalion 8 is located at Fire Station #34, Battalion 9 is located at Fire Station #47; Battalion 10 is out of service as of Oct. 22, 2012. Division Chief 806 is located at Fire Station #55, while Division Chief 807 is located at Fire Station #1. The Swift Water Rescue Unit is located at Fire Station #34 and the Urban Search and Rescue Units are located at Fire Stations 33 and 19.

=== Courts ===
The City of Dallas maintains its own municipal courts for trying Class C misdemeanors including violations of City ordinances, and certain civil matters.

== Budget ==
In the 2006–2007 fiscal year, the city's total budget (the sum of operating and capital budgets) was US$2,344,314,114. The city has seen a steady increase in its budget throughout its history due to sustained growth: the budget was $1,717,449,783 in 2002–2003, $1,912,845,956 in 2003–2004, $2,049,685,734 in 2004–2005 and $2,218,345,070 in 2005–2006.

== Crime ==
From 1998 until 2005 (the most recent year with available statistics), the city of Dallas has had the highest overall crime rate for the nine United States cities with over 1 million people. Violent crime in Dallas was also ranked #1 during the same time period. Murders peaked at 500 in 1991. It then fluctuated from 227 in 2000 to 240 in 2001, 196 in 2002, 223 in 2003, 275 in 2004, and finally 198 in 2005, marking a sharp decline over the two previous years. However, Dallas was again ranked in 2005 as the most dangerous city out of the ten largest cities in the United States.

== Other governments ==
Federal
House of Representatives			Senate		
Name	Party	District	Name	Party	
Keith Self	Republican	District 3	John Cornyn	Republican	
Pat Fallon	Republican	District 4	Ted Cruz	Republican	
Lance Gooden	Republican	District 5			
Jake Ellzey	Republican	District 6			
Beth Van Duyne	Republican	District 24			
Jasmine Crockett	Democratic	District 30			
Julie Johnson	Democratic	District 32			
Marc Veasey	Democratic	District 33			
State
House of Representatives			Senate		
Name	Party	District	Name	Party	District
Venton Jones	Democratic	District 100	Bob Hall	Republican	District 2
Ana-Maria Ramos	Democratic	District 102	Angela Paxton	Republican	District 8
Rafael Anchia	Democratic	District 103	Kelly Hancock	Republican	District 9
Jessica González	Democratic	District 104	Nathan M. Johnson	Democratic	District 16
Terry Meza	Democratic	District 105	Royce West	Democratic	District 23
Victoria Neave	Democratic	District 107			
Morgan Meyer	Republican	District 108			
Aicha Davis	Democratic	District 109			
Toni Rose	Democratic	District 110			
Yvonne Davis	Democratic	District 111			
Angie Chen Button	Republican	District 112			
Rhetta Bowers	Democratic	District 113			
John Bryant	Democratic	District 114			
Cassandra Hernandez	Democratic	District 115			

=== Texas ===
State trial courts sitting in the City of Dallas or in adjacent portions of Dallas County with jurisdiction of matters arising in the City include civil district courts, criminal district courts, family district courts, juvenile district courts, county courts at law, county criminal courts, justice of the peace and small claims courts, and probate courts.

The Texas Department of Criminal Justice (TDCJ) operates the Parole Division Region II headquarters in Dallas. The Dallas I and Dallas III district parole offices are in the same complex as the headquarters, while the Dallas IV district parole office, the Dallas IV satellite, and the Dallas V district parole office are in different locations in Dallas. The Dallas II district parole office is in Garland.

=== United States ===
The United States District Court for the Northern District of Texas, which exercises original jurisdiction over 100 counties in North and West Texas, convenes in the Earle Cabell Federal Building and Courthouse in the Government District of downtown. The same building additionally houses United States Bankruptcy and Magistrate Courts and a United States Attorney office. Dallas also is the seat of the Fifth Court of Appeals of Texas.

The United States Post Office operates several post offices in Dallas. The main Dallas Post Office is at 401 Dallas-Fort Worth Turnpike (Interstate 30, also known as the Tom Landry Freeway).

The Federal Bureau of Prisons has its South Central Regional Office in Dallas.

== See also ==
- Sister cities of Dallas, Texas
