= Silesian Zoological Garden =

Zoological garden in the Katowice and Chorzów districts of Silesia, Poland

Coordinates: 50.281661°N 18.993473°E

- Śląski Ogród Zoologiczny
- Interactive map of Silesian Zoological Garden
- Date opened: 1954
- Location: Katowice and Chorzów, Poland
- Land area: 47.6 hectares (118 acres)
- No. of animals: 2,500
- No. of species: 300
- Annual visitors: 390,000
- Major exhibits: Mini-zoo, Dinosaur Valley
- Website: http://www.zoo.silesia.pl

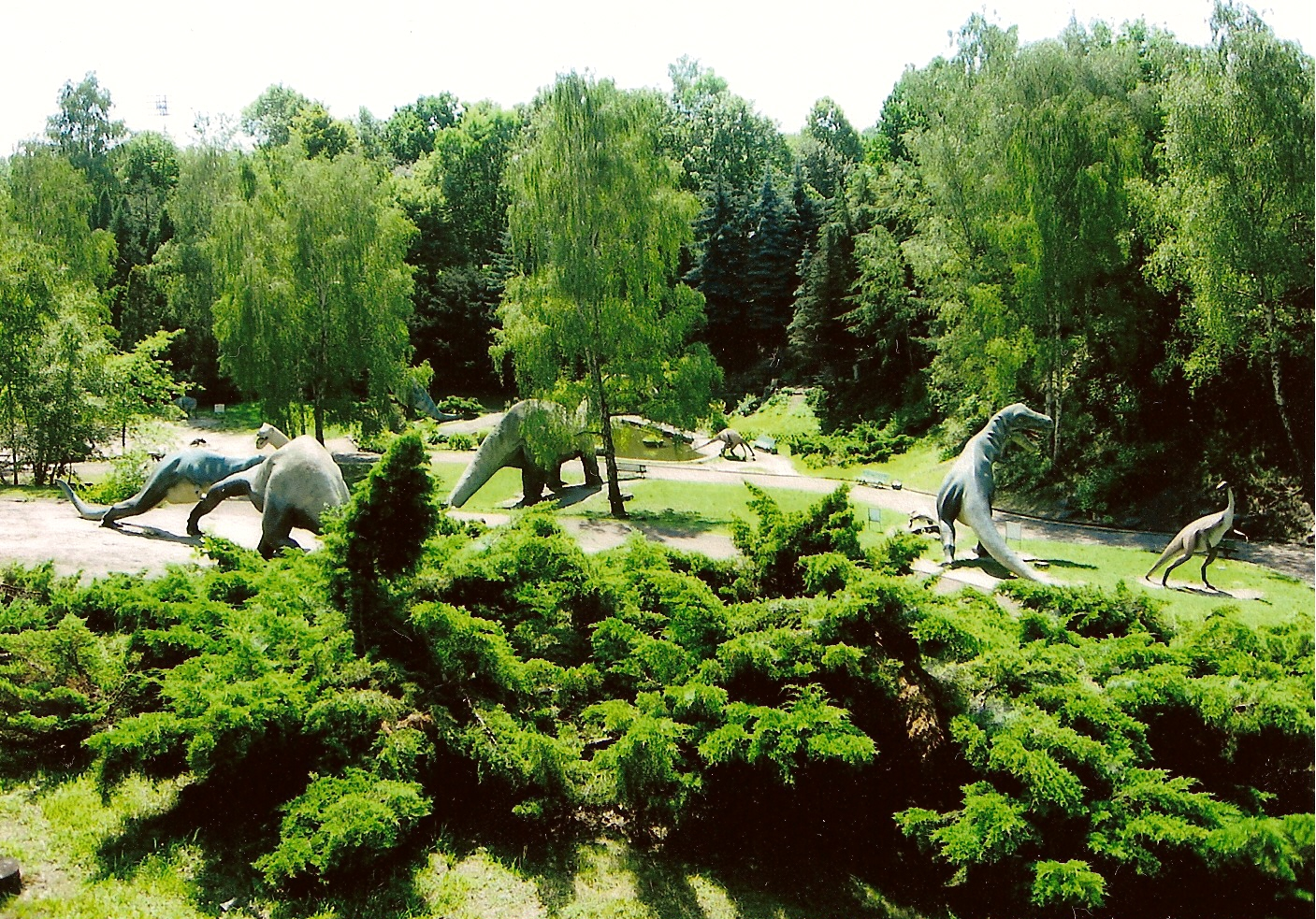
The Dinosaurs Valley in Silesian Zoological Garden (reconstructions of prehistoric reptiles)

Silesian Zoological Garden (Polish: Śląski Ogród Zoologiczny) is a zoological garden in Poland. It was founded in 1954 and is situated in the Katowice and Chorzów cities in the Metropolis GZM. It covers over 47.6 ha within the Silesian Park.

The Silesian zoo is a home for about 2,500 animals of 300 species. It is visited by over 390,000 people annually.

A mini-zoo is the collection of gentler animals which are (directly) accessible to children.

The dinosaur valley contains a full-scale reconstruction of 16 large dinosaurs, the remains of which were found by a Polish expedition to the Gobi Desert.
