= Lake Jacomo =

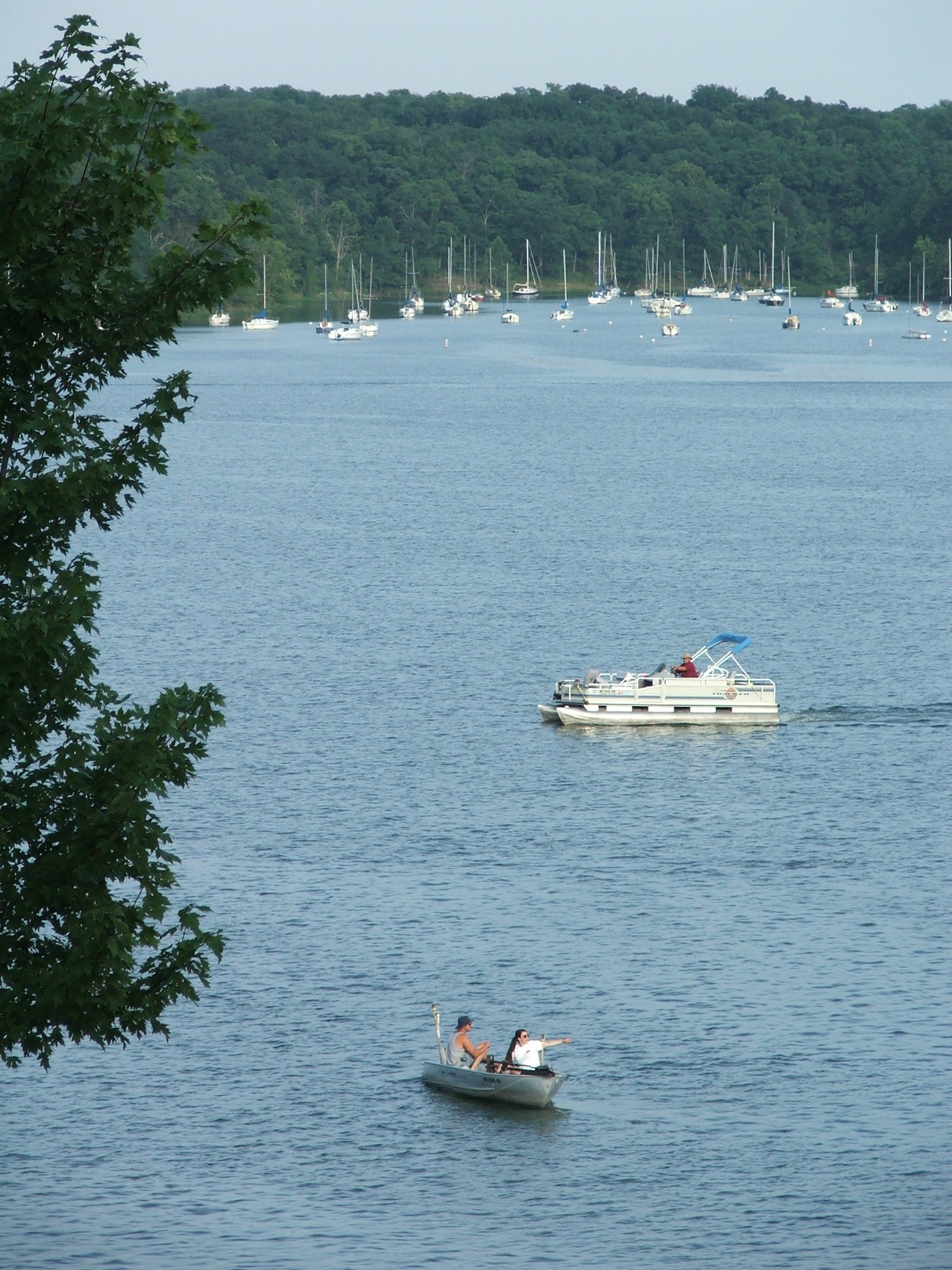

- Location within Missouri Location within the United States
- Location: Jackson County, near Blue Springs, Missouri
- Coordinates: 38°58′34″N 94°19′55″W
- Type: reservoir
- Primary inflows: Prairie Lee Lake
- Primary outflows: Blue Springs Lake
- Basin countries: United States
- Managing agency: Jackson County Parks and Recreation
- Built: 1952-1959
- First flooded: 1959
- Surface area: 970 acres (3.9 km^{2})
- Max. depth: 53 feet (16 m)
- Shore length^{1}: approximately 19 mi (31 km)
- Surface elevation: 833 feet (254 m)
- Frozen: minimally in some coves
- ^{1} Shore length is not a well-defined measure.

Lake Jacomo /dʒəˈkoʊmoʊ/ is a 970-acre (3.9 km^{2}) freshwater reservoir located near Blue Springs in Jackson County, Missouri. It is located in the 7,809-acre (32 km^{2}) Fleming Park, which is managed by the Jackson County Parks and Recreation Association.

The idea for the lake began in 1932. The Presiding Judge of Jackson County, Harry S. Truman, requested that a study be done for a potential park. However, nothing was done at that time. It was 20 years later that local voters approved a bond issue to create and develop the lake. Lake Jacomo officially opened on May 30, 1959.

== Origin of name ==
The lake's name is an acronym, from Jackson County, MO (Missouri), the county in which it is located.

== Recreational activities ==
Activities at Lake Jacomo include sailing, sailboat racing, pontoon boating, fishing, and hiking. Common fish found in the lake include crappie, bluegill, largemouth bass, carp, catfish, hybrid striped bass, green sunfish, and walleye.

== Marina ==
Lake Jacomo has a marina open to the public year around. This marina is the largest boat rental marina in the Kansas City metropolitan area with more than 80 rentals available.

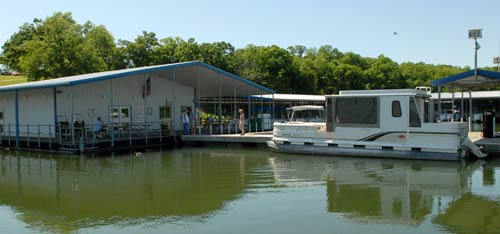
