= Fleming Park (Missouri) =

City park in western Missouri, U.S.

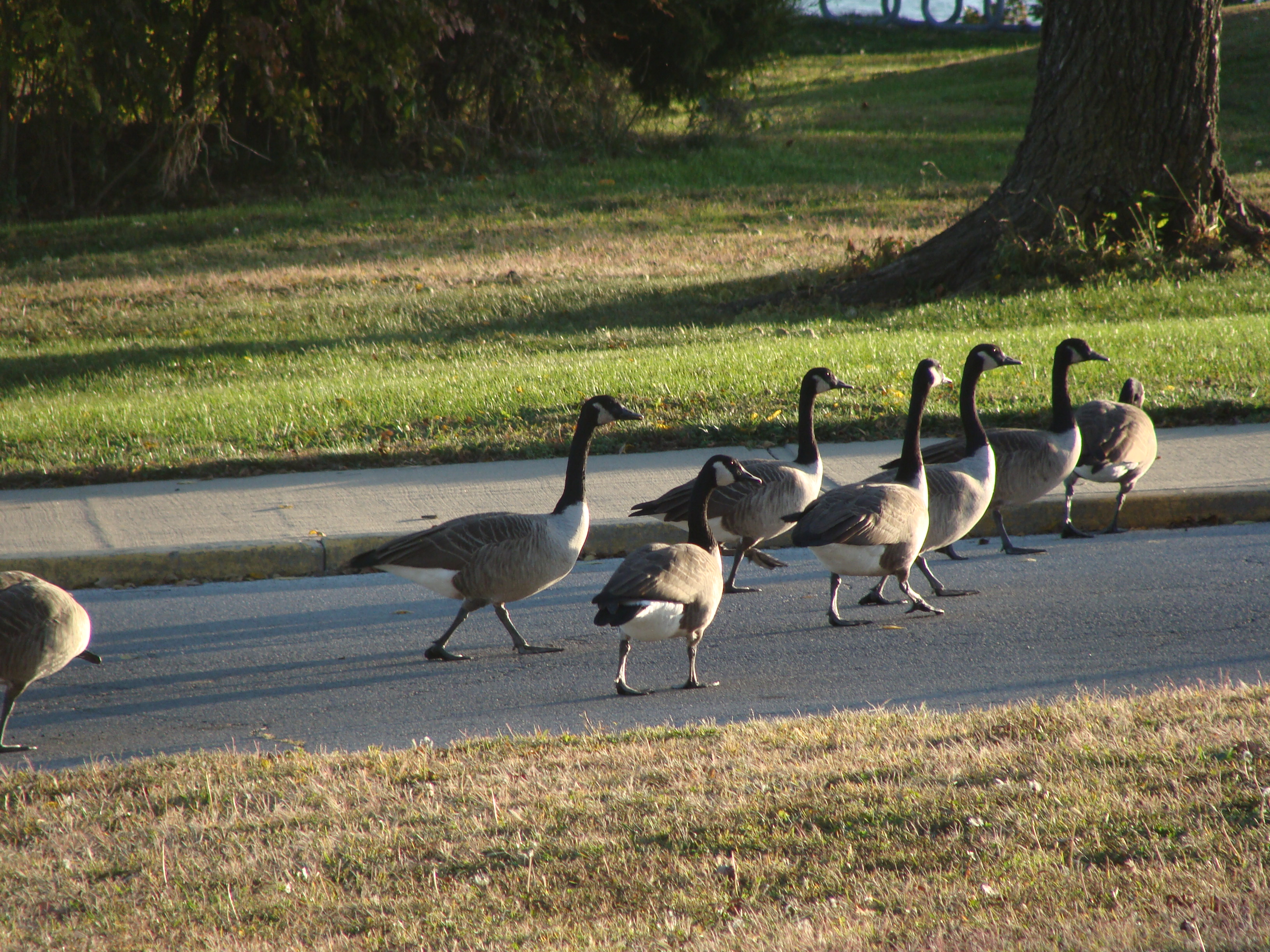
- Interactive map of Fleming Park
- Type: Country park
- Location: Blue Springs in Jackson County, Missouri
- Coordinates: 38.9935°N 94.315°W
- Area: 7,809 acres (3,160 ha)
- Created: after 1959
- Operator: Jackson County Parks and Recreation
- Visitors: 1.3 million
- Status: Open all year
- Website: Fleming Park

Fleming Park is a public park in Blue Springs, Missouri, United States. It is the largest park in Jackson County, encompassing 7,809 acres (3,160 ha), of which 1,690 acres (680 ha) is water.

== Recreational Activities ==
There are two large lakes within the park:

- Lake Jacomo, covering 970 acres (390 ha)
- Blue Springs Lake, covering 720 acres (290 ha).

Other recreational features located in the park include:

- Missouri Town 1855
- Native Hoofed Animal Enclosure
- Marinas
- Campgrounds
- Kemper Outdoor Education Center
