= List of parks in Jacksonville, Florida =

The city of Jacksonville, Florida operates the largest urban park system in the United States, providing facilities and services at more than 337 locations on more than 80,000 acres (320 km^{2}) located throughout the city. In addition to municipal parks, there are ten state parks, five national facilities, and several other gardens and arboretums in the area.

== Parks ==
This is a list of public parks in and around Jacksonville, Florida.

=== Municipal ===
- 103rd Street Sports Complex
- 9A/Baymeadows Regional Park
- Adams Park
- Adolph Wurn Park
- Alberts Field
- Alejandro Garces Camp Tomahawk Park
- Alexandria Oaks Park
- Alimacani Boat Ramp
- Alimacani Elementary School Park
- Alimacani Park and Boat Ramp
- Andrew Jackson Pool
- Angelina Danese Park
- A. Philip Randolph Heritage Park
- Archie Dickinson Park
- Argyle Forest Park
- Arlington Lions Club Park
- Arlington Road Boat Ramp
- Arlingwood Park
- Atlantic Beach Elementary
- Atlantic Highlands Park
- Baker Point
- Baker Skinner Park
- Baldwin Middle/Senior High School
- Balis Park
- Barney Browning Park
- Bay and Broad Pocket Park
- Beach and Peach Urban Park
- Beach Blvd. Boat Ramp
- Beachwood Center and Park
- Bee Street Park
- Belmonte Park
- Belvedere Park 1 and 2
- Bent Creek Golf Course of Jacksonville
- Bert Maxwell Boat Ramp
- Bethesda Park
- Bettes Park
- Betz Tiger Point Preserve
- Beverly Hills Park & Lewis Cobb Community Center
- Big Pottsburg Creek Preserve
- Big Talbot Island State Park
- Bishop Circle Park
- Bishopswood Park
- Black Hammock Island Park
- Blue Cypress Park, Community Center & Golf Course
- Bob Hayes Sports Complex and Legends Center
- Bogey Creek Preserve
- Boone Park
- Brackridge Park
- Brannan Field Park
- Brentwood Golf Course
- Brooklyn Park
- Brookview Elementary School Park
- Brown L. Whatley Memorial Park
- Bruce Park
- Buck Park
- Bulls Bay Preserve
- Burnett Park
- Buster Ford Checkerboard Park
- Caleb Park
- Cameron Park
- Camp Milton Historic Preserve
- Cancer Survivors Park
- Cardinal Park
- Carrol Road Park
- Carvill Park
- Castaway Island Preserve
- Catherine Hester McNair Park
- Cecil Field
- Cecil Field Greenway AKA Cecil Field Conservation Corridor
- Cecil Recreation Complex
- Cedar Point Boat Ramp
- Cedar Point Preserve
- Cemetery Park
- Cesery Park
- Chapelgate Park
- Charles Boobie Clark Park and Pool
- Charles Reese Memorial Park
- Cherry Street Park
- Chets Creek Elementary
- Chuck Rogers Park renamed Rogers Park in 2021
- Cisco Gardens Park
- Clanzel T. Brown Park
- Colonial Manor Lake Park
- Columbus Park
- Concord Park
- Confederate Park, renamed Springfield Park in 2020
- Corkscrew Park
- Cortez Park
- County Dock
- Crabtree Park
- Cradle Creek Preserve
- Criswell Park
- Crown Point Elementary
- Crystal Springs Elementary
- Crystal Springs Road Park & Julian Barrs Community Center
- Cuba Hunter Park
- Curtis Lee Johnson Marina Boat Ramp formerly Lighthouse Marine Boat Ramp
- Dames Point Park and El Faro Memorial
- David Wayne Pack Park
- Deerwood Rotary Childrens Park
- Desoto Park
- Dinsmore Boat Ramp
- Dinsmore Park and Community Center
- Dinsmore Playground
- Drew Park
- Dutton Island Preserve
- Earl Johnson Memorial Park
- Eartha H. Napoleon Park
- Ed Austin Regional Park
- Edgewood Park 1,2,3
- Edwards Park
- Ed White School Pool
- El Faro Memorial At Dames Point Park
- Elizabeth "Betty" Wolfe Park formerly Pickwick Park
- Elizabeth R. Powell Park
- Emmett Reed Park and Community Center
- Englewood High School Pool
- Eugene M. Glover Playground
- Exchange Club Island
- FEC Park renamed Alexandria Oaks Park
- Fishweir Park
- Fletcher High School Pool
- Fletcher Morgan Park
- Fletcher Park
- Florida C. Dwight Memorial Playground
- Flossie Brunson Eastside Park
- Flynn Park renamed Walter Anderson Memorial Park in 2019
- Forestry Tower Park
- Forestview Park
- Forrest High School Pool renamed Westside High School Pool in 2019
- Fort Caroline Club
- Fort Family Regional Park formerly 9A/Baymeadows Regional Park
- Fouraker Park
- Freedom Park
- Friendship Fountain formerly Friendship Park
- Fulton Road Landing
- G.E.N.A. Park
- Gamewell Tot Lot
- Garden City Elementary School Park
- Garden City Park
- Genovar Park
- Gerrie`s Park
- Glen Myra Park
- Glynlea Park
- Golf Club of Jacksonville renamed Bent Creek Golf Course of Jacksonville
- Goodbys Creek Preserve
- Goodbys Lake Boat Ramp renamed John T. Lowe Boat Ramp at Goodbys Creek
- Granada Park
- Greenland Park
- Greenridge Road Park
- Greenscape Celebration Park
- Grove Park
- Grunthal Park
- Half Moon Island Preserve and Boat Ramp
- Hammond Park
- Hanna Park
- Harborview Boat Ramp
- Helen Cooper Floyd Park "Little Jetties"
- Hemming Plaza renamed James Weldon Johnson Park in 2020
- Henry J. Klutho Park
- Henry L. Brown Kooker Park
- Henry T. Jones Community Center
- Henry T. Jones Park
- Highlands Middle School Pool
- Historic Kings Road Park
- Holiday Hill Elementary School Park
- Holiday Road Park
- Hollybrook Park
- Hollywood Park
- Home Gardens Park
- Hood Landing Boat Ramp ecr
- Huffman Boulevard Park
- Huguenot Memorial Park
- Huguenot Park
- Huntington Forest
- Hyde Grove Elementary
- Intracoastal Boat Ramp
- Isle of Palms Park
- Ivey Road Park
- Jacksonville-Baldwin Rail Trail
- J. Gardner Nip Sams Memorial Park
- J. S. Johnson Park
- Jacksonville-Baldwin Rail Trail
- Jacksonville Beach Golf Course
- Jacksonville Beach Pier
- Jacksonville Heights Elementary School Park
- Jacksonville Riverwalks
- Jacksonville Zoo Boat Dock
- James and Downing Park
- James Fields Park
- James Weldon Johnson Park
- James P. Small Park
- James Weldon Johnson Park formerly Hemming Plaza
- Jammes Road Park
- Jasmine Park
- J.E.B. Stuart School Park renamed Westside Middle School Park in 2021.
- Jerusalem and White
- Jesse B. Smith Memorial Plaza
- Jessie Ball DuPont Park
- Jim King Park and Boat Ramp at Sisters Creek
- Jim Rink Park
- Jim Wingate Preserve
- Joe Carlucci Sisters Creek Park and Boat Ramp
- Joe Davis Memorial Park
- Joe James Center
- John D. Liverman Park
- John Murray Forbes Park
- John N. McPherson Park
- John Stockton Elementary School Park
- Johnnie W. Walker Park & Community Center
- Joseph Lee Center
- Joseph Stilwell Middle School Park
- Julington Durbin Creek Preserve
- Julius Guinyard Park and Pool
- Justina Road Elementary Park
- Kathryn Abbey Hanna Park
- Kayak Amelia
- Kings Road Historic Preserve -- Thomas Creek Wildlife Properties
- Klutho Park
- Kona Skatepark
- Lake Lucina Elementary Park
- Lake Shore Middle School Pool
- Lakeside Park I and II
- Landon Park
- Lannie Road Park
- Largo Well Park
- Lem Merrett Park
- Leonard Abess Park
- Lew Brantley Park & McGirts Creek Community Center
- Liberty Park
- Lift Ev'ry Voice And Sing Park
- Lighthouse Marine Boat Ramp renamed Curtis Lee Johnson Boat Ramp
- Lillian Saunders Center
- Lillian S. Davin Park
- Little Talbot Island State Park
- Little Van Wert Park
- Long Branch Park
- Lonnie C. Miller Sr. Regional Park
- Lonnie Wurn Boat Ramp
- Losco Regional Park
- Lovelace Park
- Lynn Park
- Main Street Park
- Mallison Park and Center
- Mandarin High School Pool
- Mandarin South Library Park
- Manson Bull Felder Park
- Marion Park
- Marjenhoff Park
- Martin Luther King Elementary
- Mary Lena Gibbs Park
- Maxville Park
- May Mann Jennings Park
- Mayport Waterfront Park
- McCoys Creek Boulevard Park
- McCue Park & Boat Ramp
- McGirts Creek Park
- McGirts Creek Park Expansion
- Melvin Park
- Memorial Park
- Metropolitan Park
- Michael B Scanlon Mayport Boat Ramp
- Mickey King Park
- Mitchell Community Center and Park
- Modesky-Park Modesky Park
- Monticello Wildlands
- Murray Drive Playground
- Murray Hill Art Center at Herbert Bayer Park
- Murray Hill Four Corners Park
- Murray Hill Playground
- Myrtle Avenue Park
- Nathan Krestul Park
- Native Parks 1 and 2
- New Berlin Boat Ramp
- Norman Studios
- Normandy Boulevard Sports Complex
- Normandy Center
- Normandy Park
- Northbank Riverwalk Artist Square
- Northbank Riverwalk
- North Shore Park
- Norwood Park
- Oak Harbor Boat Ramp
- Oak Hill Elementary Park
- Oakland Park
- Oceanway Community Center, Park and Pool
- Ortega Hills Park
- Ortega Hills Playground
- Our Community Club Park
- Pablo Creek Preserve
- Palmer Terrace
- Palmetto Leaves Regional Park
- Palms Fish Camp
- Panama Park
- Parkwood Heights Elementary Park
- Patton Park
- Paxon High School
- Peace Memorial Rose Garden Park
- Pickwick Park renamed Elizabeth "Betty" Wolfe Park in 2011
- Pine Forest Elementary School Park
- Pope Duval Park
- Powers Park
- Rail Trail Buffer Properties
- Raines High School
- Ray Greene Park
- Raymond E. Davis Park
- Reddie Point Preserve
- Reed Island
- Ribault High School Pool
- Ribault River Preserve
- Ribault River Preserve Expansion
- Ribault Scenic Drive Park
- Ringhaver Park
- Ritz Park
- Riverfront Park
- River Oaks Park
- Riverside High School Pool
- Riverside Park
- Riverview Park
- Robert F. Kennedy Park and Community Center
- Rogers Park formerly Chuck Rogers Park
- Rolliston Park
- Rondette Park
- Ronnie Van Zant Memorial Park
- Royal Terrace
- Russell Bill Cook Jr. Park formerly Jones Street Park
- Ryder Park
- S. A. Hull Elementary School Park
- Sal Taylor Creek Preserve
- San Jose Acre Park
- San Jose Elementary School Park
- San Mateo Elementary Park
- San Mateo Little League
- San Mateo Neighborhood Park
- San Pablo Elementary Playground
- Sandalwood High School Pool
- Saratoga Lake Park
- Scott Park
- Seaton Creek Historic Preserve
- Seminole Park
- Sidney J. Gefen Riverwalk Park
- Signet Park
- Simonds-Johnson Park
- Singleton Park
- Sisters Creek boat ramp
- S-Line Rail Trail
- Southbank Riverwalk
- Southside Estates Elementary School Park
- Southside Park
- Springfield Park originally Confederate Park
- Springfield Playground originally Confederate Playground
- St. Johns Marina
- St. Johns Park
- St. Nicholas Playground
- St. Nicholas Train Station Park
- Stinson Park
- Stockton Park
- Stone Park
- Sunny Acres
- Sweetwater Playground
- T. K. Stokes Boat Ramp
- Tallulah Park
- Tara Woods Park
- Taye Brown Regional Park
- Terrace Park
- Terry Parker Pool and Park
- Thebaut Sisters Landing
- Thomas Creek Preserve & Fish Camp
- Thomas Jefferson Elementary
- Thomas Jefferson Park
- Tideviews Preserve
- Tidewater Acres Park
- Tillie K. Fowler Regional Park
- Timucuan Ecological and Historic Preserve
- Timucuan Elementary
- Timuquana Park
- Tom Marshall Park
- Tommy Hazouri Sr. Park
- Touchton Road Park
- Treaty Oak in Jessie Ball duPont Park
- Tree Hill Nature Center
- Trout River Pier
- Venetia Elementary School Park
- Verona Park
- Veterans Memorial Wall
- Victoria Park
- Victory Park
- Walter Anderson Memorial Park formerly Flynn Park
- Walter Jones Historical Park
- Warren W. Schell Jr. Memorial Park
- Warrington Park
- Water & Broad St. Pocket Park
- Wayne B. Stevens Boat Ramp
- Wesconnett Elementary School Park
- Wesconnett Playground
- Westbrook Center and Park
- Westridge Park
- Westside High School Pool
- Westside Middle School Park
- Westside Park
- Westwood Park
- Wheat Road Park
- Whitehouse Park
- Wigmore Park
- Wiley Road Playground
- William F. Sheffield Regional Park
- Willowbranch Park
- Willowbranch Rose Garden Park
- Windsor Place Park
- Windy Hill Center
- Windy Hill Elementary Park
- Wolfson High School Park and Pool
- Woodstock Park & Edith B. Ford Community Center
- Yacht Basin Park
- Yancey Park
- Yellow Water Trailhead
- Yerkes Park
- Young Men's And Young Women's Leadership Academy Pool
- Zeta Phi Beta Park

=== State ===
- Amelia Island State Park
- Anastasia State Park
- Big Talbot Island State Park
- Fort Clinch State Park
- Fort George Island Cultural State Park
- George Crady Bridge Fishing Pier State Park
- Jennings State Forest
- Little Talbot Island State Park
- Olustee Battlefield Historic State Park
- Pumpkin Hill Creek Preserve State Park
- Yellow Bluff Fort Historic State Park

=== Federal ===
- Castillo de San Marcos National Monument
- Cumberland Island National Seashore
- Fort Caroline National Memorial
- Fort Matanzas National Monument
- Jacksonville National Cemetery
- Timucuan Ecological and Historic Preserve
- Kingsley Plantation

=== Private ===
- Cummer Museum of Art and Gardens
- Jacksonville Arboretum & Gardens
- Jacksonville Zoo and Gardens
- Palm and Cycad Arboretum
