= Tree Hill Nature Center =

Non-profit organization and wilderness preserve in Jacksonville, Florida

Coordinates: 30.3335°N 81.5792°W

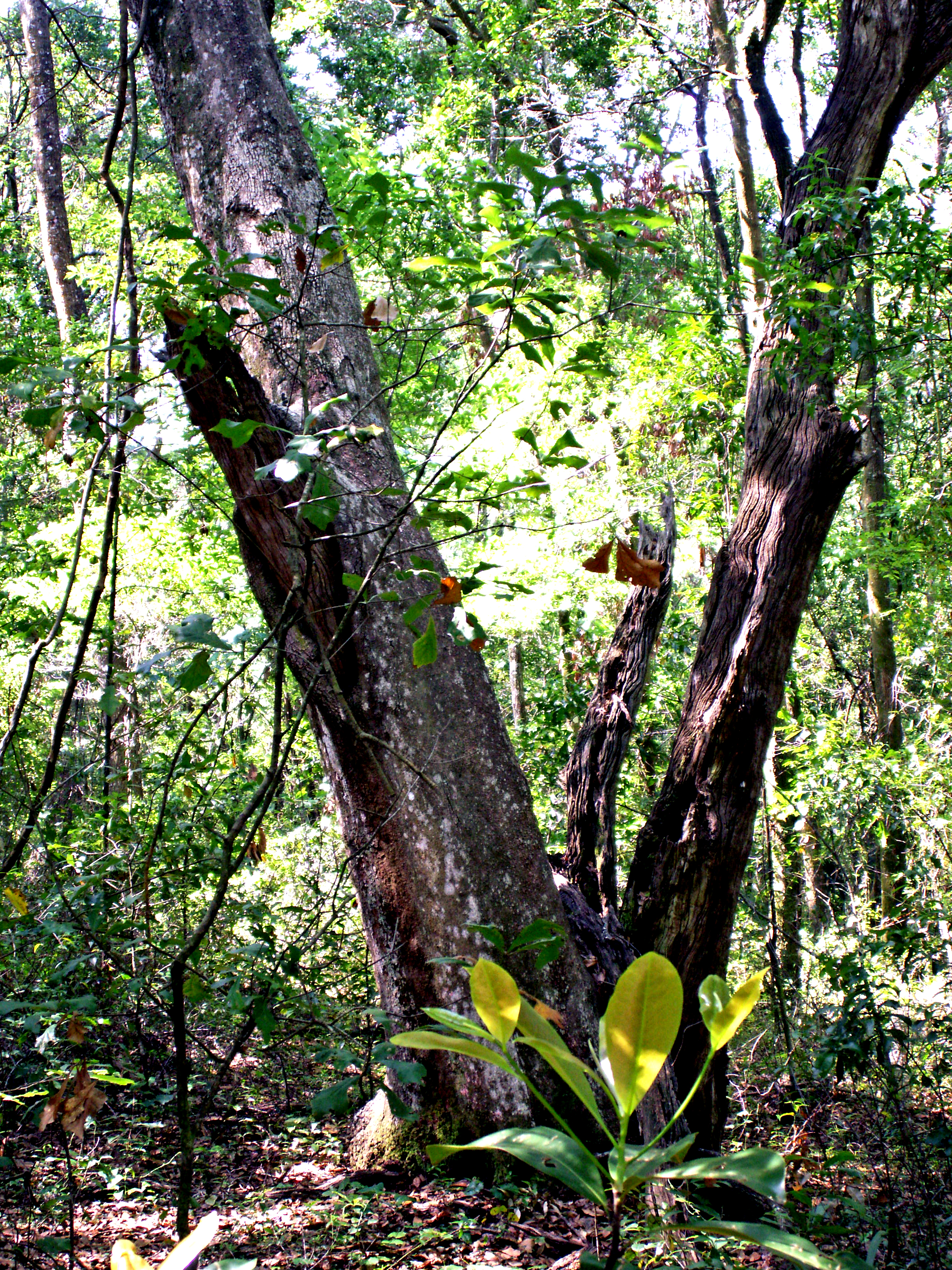
- Formation: 1971
- Type: Non-profit
- Legal status: Corporation
- Purpose: Nature preserve
- Headquarters: 7152 Lone Star Road
- Location: Arlington, Jacksonville, Florida, United States
- Region served: Jacksonville metropolitan area
- Executive Director: Mark Mummaw
- Main organ: Board of Directors
- Website: TreeHill.org

The Tree Hill Nature Center is a 501(c)(3) non-profit organization and wilderness preserve in Jacksonville, Florida, organized for the purpose of providing an educational experience for visitors to appreciate and learn about the natural environment in Jacksonville. The land was acquired to preserve and protect an urban wilderness area containing sensitive plants and animals from surrounding development. The city park opened in 1971.

The organization has participated in efforts that preserved other land and created other parks in Jacksonville.

== Property ==
=== Original ===
The original property of 40 acres was split into multiple tracts, with the state of Florida purchasing most of the acreage in 1975, and ownership held by the Florida Trustees of the Internal Improvement Trust Fund (TIITF). The TIITF board is composed of the Florida Governor and the cabinet (Chief Financial Officer, Attorney General, and Commissioner of Agriculture and Consumer Services).

=== Ten more ===
The city purchased an additional 10 acres in 1998, acquired through a grant from Florida Communities Trust (FCT). The land is the former location of Lone Star Stables.

Development of the property was divided into three phases. The first, begun in 2002, included removing debris, property fencing, an environmental survey, and creation of a development plan. The city of Jacksonville allocated funds for completing phase 1 in 2004. Additionally, a grant was obtained from the Florida Recreation Development Assistance Program (FRDAP) to cover amphitheater construction, landscaping, parking, and construction of new trails with learning stations. Improvements began in 2006 which consisted of the amphitheater roof, restrooms and storage areas.

== History ==
The property known as "Tree Hill" was put up for sale in early 1970 by private owners. Arlington residents from church and civic organizations formed Preservation Association for Tree Hill (PATH) during that summer and begin negotiating for the purchase of 21½ acres. PATH raised $10,000 in May 1971 to secure a lease with an option to purchase the parcel for $230,000. In 1971, the City of Jacksonville began providing funds for Tree Hill operations.

A contractual arrangement with the Duval County School Board began in 1974, under which Tree Hill provides elementary school instruction, teacher training, and science curriculum materials development for the school district. Legislators from Jacksonville created a state budget earmark, and $445,000 in state money was appropriated in 1974. Governor Reubin Askew personally delivered the check to PATH, and in December, the Florida Department of Natural Resources provided funds for the state to acquire the first 21.92 acres.

Ann Merrian was hired as Tree Hill's first director in June 1975. The gazebo styled pavilion and restrooms were completed and dedicated in May 1976. An old garage on the property was converted into a Biology laboratory during November 1977.

The Environmental Center at Tree Hill was dedicated in June 1985. Natural science day camps were first offered during the summer of 1986. Lucille Heine (Cortese) -a local celebrity- became Tree Hill's first paid Executive Director in 1987, primarily to administer the increasing number of grants received, contracts for services, and programs offered.

In 1990, Tree Hill received 160 acres of land on the west side of Jacksonville from the estate of Martin E. Stein. In 2000, Tree Hill donated 10 acres of the Stein bequest to the city of Jacksonville for the creation of McGirts Creek Park, later renamed Lew Brantley Park. In 2004, the center donated the remaining Stein property to the city of Jacksonville for the creation of Tillie Fowler Regional Park.

The Jacksonville Community Foundation began an Endowment Fund for Tree Hill in 2002. The www.treehill.org website was launched that year. An annual Butterfly Festival has been held every spring since 2002.

The Flight of Fancy butterfly house was constructed in 2007, as was a 300-seat amphitheatre with a 3,700 ft^{2} covered stage. The following year, the Tree Hill organization was given $150,000 for the 5-year naming rights to the amphitheatre, whereupon the structure was named the Joseph A. Strasser Amphitheatre.

Several live displays of animals, including gopher tortoises, possums, goats, chickens, fish and snakes, were added in 2009. The nearby Jacksonville Arboretum & Gardens was organized and is operated like Tree Hill.

== Park features ==
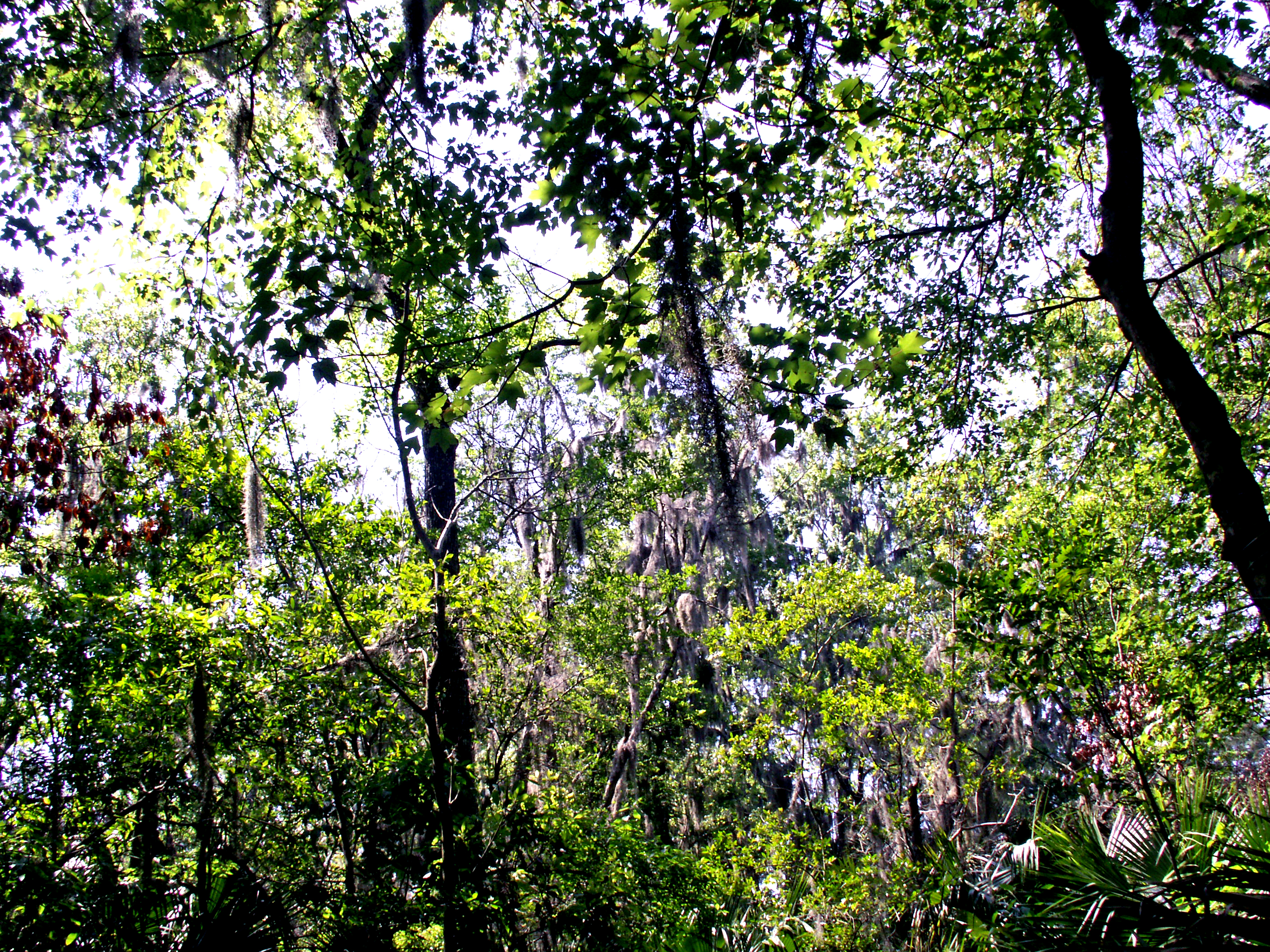
Tree canopy

The Strawberry Creek, Red Bay Branch and Howland Creek run the length of the park, which includes three different ecosystems and three trails. Approximately 25,000 people visit the nature center each year. The hill is actually Duval County's second highest point at 36 feet above sea level and boasts a 300-year-old oak tree.

- Animal Encounter provides an opportunity to learn about native animals, see them closeup and even touch some of them. Live animals at the center include: snakes, turtles, fish, alligators, lizards, frogs, armadillos, goats, chickens, an owl, an opossum, squirrels and racoons.
- The Guided Trail Tour is led by a Florida Master Naturalist who will point out different animals, their habitats, and explain how the species survive.
- The Butterfly & Hummingbird Garden is seasonal. It contains brightly colored and scented flowers that attract the ruby-throated hummingbird, and the butterfly sanctuary is home to the annual Butterfly Festival, which releases one thousand butterflies of the 15 species native to Florida. Attendance at the event exceeds 5,000.
- The Compost Area explains (and demonstrates) how the compost process works and the benefits of its use.
- A Tortoise colony lives within the fenced area near the administration building. The Gopher tortoise is a threatened species in Florida, and is protected by state law.

== Loretto Nature Center ==
In 1946, Horace Arnold gave 11 acres of undeveloped land in Mandarin to the Duval County School Board to be saved for posterity. The tract, located behind Loretto Elementary School, remained untouched until a developer offered to buy it in 1990. When the Board announced that it was considering the offer, Arnold's family and other residents strongly objected.

The Mandarin Community Club organized and circulated a petition to stop the sale and advocated creation of a nature classroom. Howard Landers and Tom Atkins, the principals of Landers-Atkins Planners, agreed to develop a project master plan at no charge, and Quinton White, marine biologist at Jacksonville University, performed the biological study. The experienced leadership at the Tree Hill Nature Center agreed to oversee development and operation of the sister site. Eventually, the elected officials were convinced to vote against the land sale.

The School Board leased the parcel to the city, which then leased it to Tree Hill Nature Center, Inc. Howard Landers commented, "The only way to get into it was through the school (property). The creek and wetlands come right down to the edge of the school property and we had to cross the creek. We looked for the narrowest place to cross it and where we wouldn't damage any significant trees."

A ceremonial ground breaking was held in 1993, but permitting took more than two years. Construction finally began in early 1996, and the trail was opened on June 6 and dedicated on July 3. A 250-foot boardwalk crosses the swamp and Oldfield Creek, then an asphalt path circles the property. The preserve was initially open only to the students at Loretto Elementary, but tours by groups from other schools gradually increased over the years.

On October 13, 1997, Tree Hill Nature Center and Landers-Atkins Planners received the Outstanding Public Development Award for 1997 from the Florida Planning and Zoning Association for their work on the Loretto Nature Center. The association presents this award to only five Florida projects each year.

== Artist coalition ==
During the summer of 2009, a group of 30 artists, including painters, writers, and musicians, organized with the goals that included increasing awareness of the environment, increasing public awareness of the Tree Hill Nature Center, using the center to display their work, and helping the center in its fundraising. All of the members' compositions include an appreciation of nature. The center's artist-in-residence, Joanelle Mulrain, helped develop the new program, which was expected to provide Tree Hill with a 25% commission on sales of members' artwork displayed by the center. As part of its arts program, the center also began staging concerts at the amphitheatre.

== See also ==
- List of botanical gardens in the United States
