= Castaway Island Preserve =

Nature park/preserve in Jacksonville, Florida

- Location within Florida
- Interactive map of Castaway Island Preserve
- Location: 2921 San Pablo Road South, Jacksonville, Florida, U.S.
- Coordinates: 30.2930694°N 81.4366009°W
- Area: 311 acres (1.26 km^{2})
- Opened: June 5, 2004
- Designer: England-Thims & Miller
- Operator: Jacksonville Department of Parks, Recreation and Community Services
- Open: Year round, sunrise to sundown
- Awards: Award of Honor, American Society of Landscape Architects
- Website: Castaway Island Preserve

Castaway Island Preserve is a 311-acre nature park in eastern Jacksonville, Florida that abuts the west bank of the Intracoastal Waterway. It received an Award of Honor in 2004 from the American Society of Landscape Architects and is wheelchair accessible.

== Property ==
The 311 acres (1.26 km^{2}) is a salt marsh Estuary with pine flatwood islands, wetland flatwood forests and upland hardwood forests. The preserve is surrounded by residential neighborhoods west and south with the historic San Pablo River (intracoastal waterway) to the east. Wildlife includes gopher tortoises, rattlesnakes, Osprey, Ibis and wood storks

Map of Castaway Island Preserve

== Development ==
The preserve includes three parcels purchased in the year 2000. Initially, 235 acres was acquired on July 28th; 25 acres on September 11th; and 49 acres on December 8th. A Florida Communities Trust (FCT) grant reimbursed the city $1,427,754 of the $3,653,353 total. It was determined that the property contained introduced species, so the project manager applied for and was awarded an $18,000 grant from the Florida Department of Environmental Protection for on-site removal, which was completed. Canoe launch, trails and parking were constructed at a cost of $700,000. A state grant from Florida Inland Navigation District (FIND) paid for half of those costs and the paved trails and wooden boardwalks are wheelchair accessible. Planning, engineering, landscape architecture, construction and grant services were provided by England-Thims & Miller.

== Features ==
- Wheelchair accessible including strollers and mobility equipment; (leashed) dog friendly;
- The trailhead features paved parking, information kiosks, picnic tables & grills, drinking fountain and restrooms.
- The 1 mile (1.6 km) Island Trail contains both concrete paths and boardwalks over marshland. It is kid friendly with nature interpretive signs and benches. A marsh overlook pavilion provides views of the intracoastal waterway.
- The 240 ft (73 m) boardwalk ends with a floating dock for launching nonmotorized boats (canoes, kayaks, paddleboards).
- A 3,000 sq ft (280 m^{2}) theater-style educational building with scheduled programs,

== See also ==
- List of parks in Jacksonville, Florida
