= Church of Our Saviour (Jacksonville) =

Episcopal church in Jacksonville, Florida, U.S.

Coordinates: 30°05′42″N 81°23′28″W

Original Church of our Saviour, ca. 1920s

The Church of Our Saviour is an Episcopal church in the Mandarin area of Jacksonville, Florida, U.S. It is located on the St. Johns River at 12236 Mandarin Road. The congregation was founded in 1880 by a group Episcopalians, Church of England members and those from other denominations who wanted to start a new church in the Anglican mode. These people had gathered for Bible readings with Professor Calvin E. Stowe and his famous wife, Harriet Beecher Stowe for many years. They constructed a small but sound church building designed by Ellis and McClure in 1883, which stood until 1964 when Hurricane Dora's winds broke off part of a giant Live Oak and sent it crashing through the church's roof. The Stowe Memorial stained glass window, created by Louis Comfort Tiffany, was completely destroyed. The congregation built a new church in a similar design; it remains an active parish in the Episcopal Diocese of Florida.

== See also ==
- Church of Our Saviour (disambiguation)
- Palmetto Leaves Stowe's memoir about living in Mandarin
