= Julington Creek =

Stream in Saint John County, Florida

Coordinates: 30°07′34″N 81°38′29″W

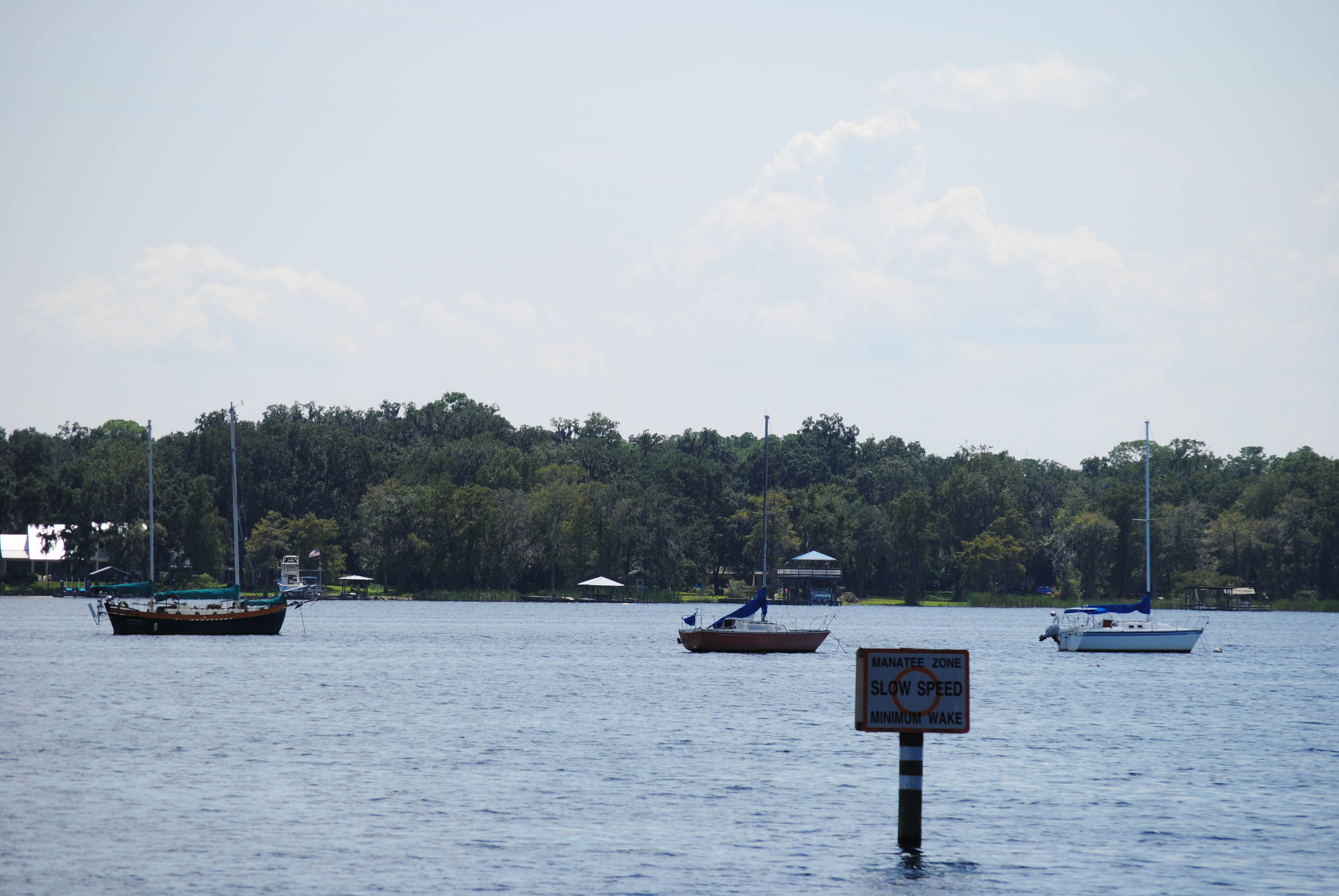

Julington Creek is a waterway in Duval County, Florida widening out into the St. Johns River in the southern part of Jacksonville. Durbin Creek is a tributary. Julington Creek feeds into the St Johns River widening out into Old Bull Bay by the border of Duval and St. Johns County, Florida. It is navigable by paddlecraft and there are boat launches and a marina.

Formerly known as Julianton Creek, land surrounding it in the area of the Julianton Plantation was granted by British Governor of East Florida Patrick Tonyn to John Christian Ross. Ross was Scottish and part of a prominent family. He had two daughters with one of his slaves. He freed her and moved from Florida to Dominica in 1784, but died within the year. Their two daughters were sent to Edinburgh to live with his father John Ross of Arnage, Aberdeenshire, the "deaf and dumb laird". Arnage Castle was home to family members.

Harriet Beecher Stowe wrote about her visits to the creek while she was living in Mandarin, Florida, in Palmetto Leaves (1873).

== History ==
Map of the lower St. Johns printed in 1876

Land along the Julington Creek was subject to claims in the late 18th century.

An account of Florida from 1837 describes settlements in an area of Julington Creek. There was a ferry across the Julington Creek.

== Geography ==
The Bartram Canoe Trail runs from Durbin Creek to Julington Creek. Florida State Road 13 (the William Bartram Scenic and Historic Highway) has a bridge over the Julington Creek.

Julington-Durbin Creek Preserve includes the peninsula formed where Julington Creek and Durbin Creek meet before Julington Creek flows towards Old Bull Bay. There is also a Julington Creek Elementary School and the community of Julington Creek Plantation in St. Johns County.

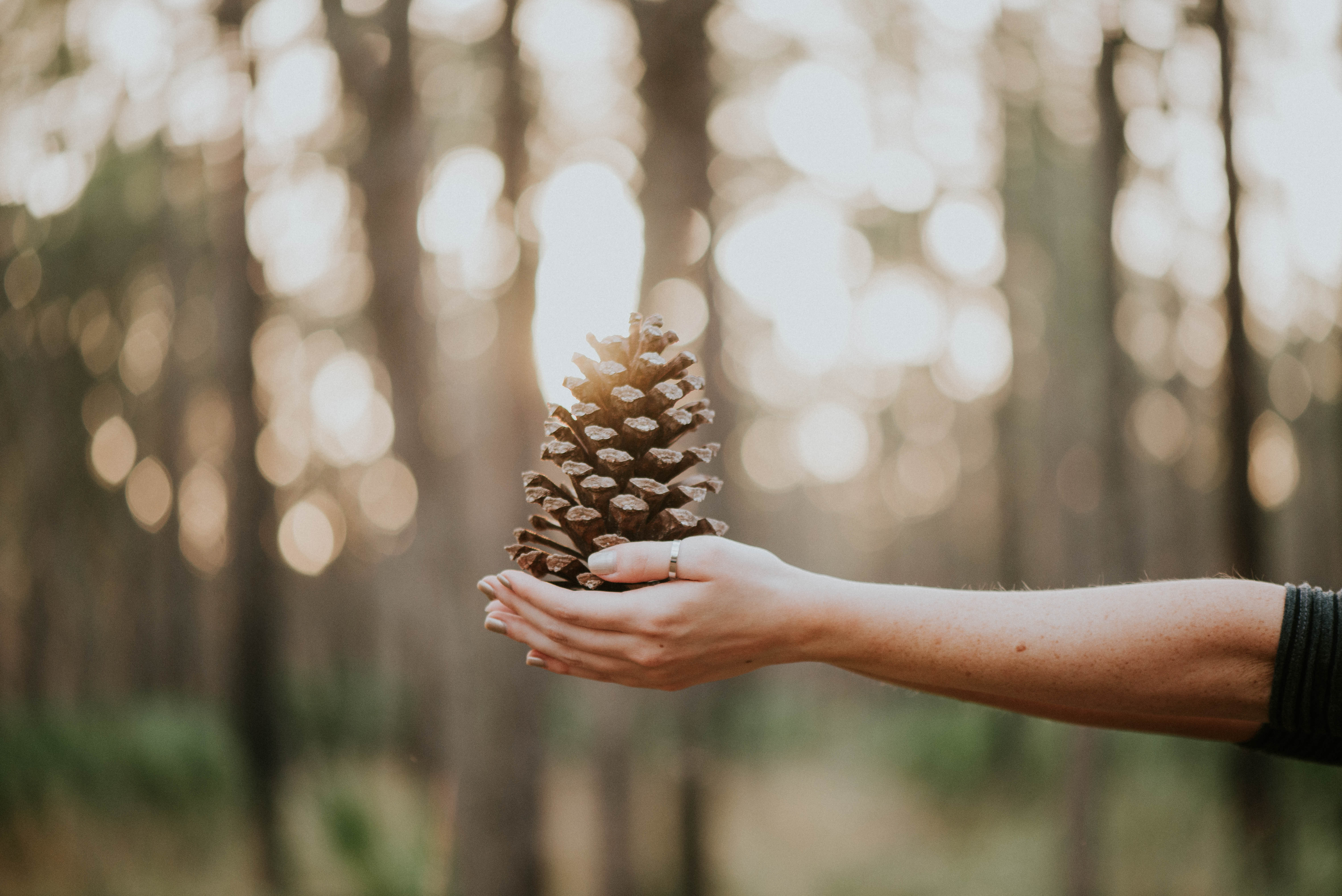
Julington-Durbin Creek Preserve

Also along Julington Creek are the Hood Landing Public Kayak Launch and Tommy Hazouri Sr. Park (formerly known as Mandarin Park) and includes the Mandarin Park Boat Ramp in Jacksonville's Mandarin neighborhood.

The Cormorant Branch stream flows into Julington Creek.

Big Davis Creek is another tributary to Julington Creek. Palmetto Leaves Regional Park is along it. The south entrance has a canoe/ kayak launch.

== See also ==
- Palmetto Leaves, an 1873 memoir and travel guide written by Harriet Beecher Stowe about her winters in the town of Mandarin
- List of parks in Jacksonville, Florida
