= Libby Gill =

American speaker and coach

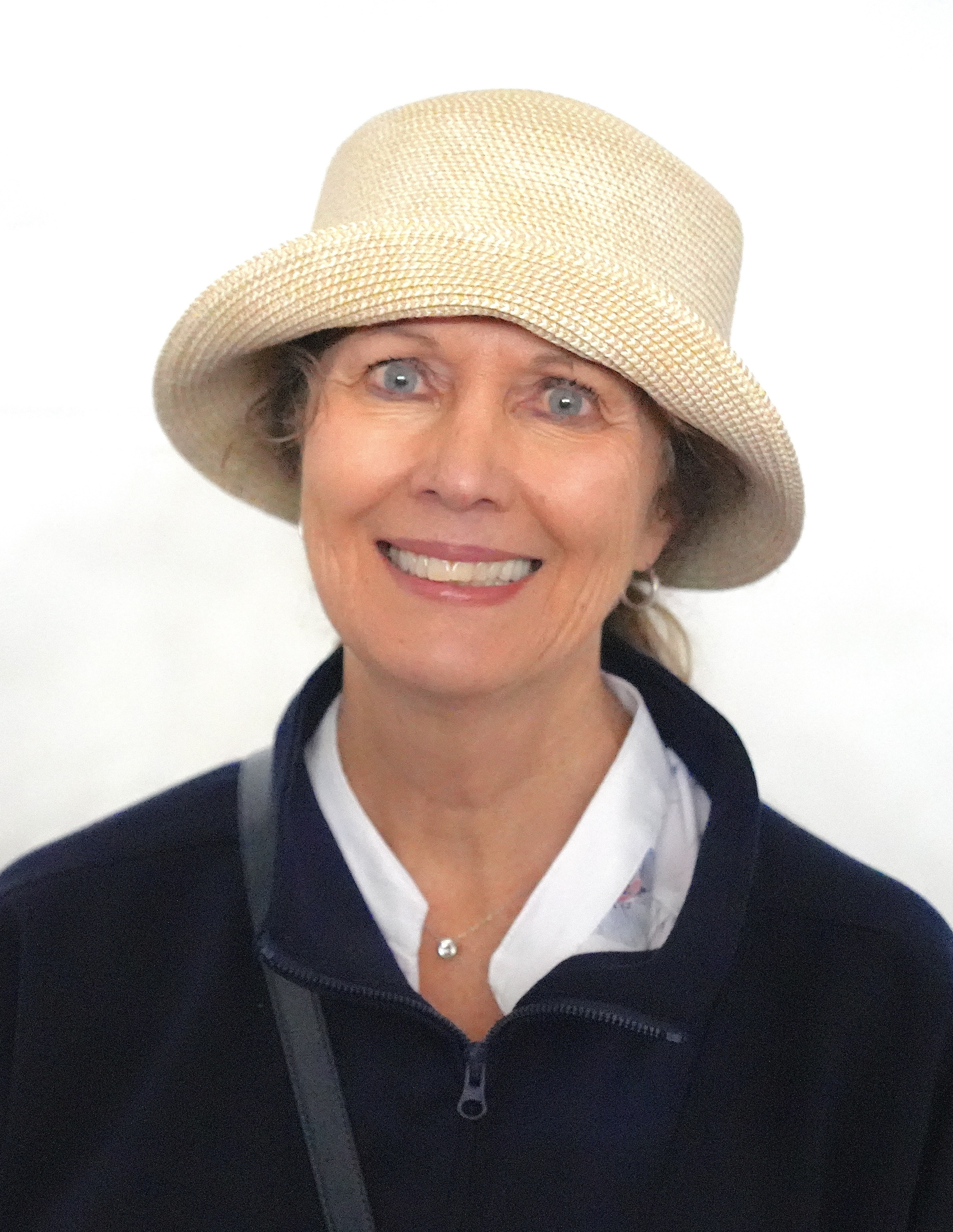
- Gill at LA Times Festival of Books 2025
- Born: 1954 (age 71–72); Geneva, New York
- Education: California State University, Long Beach
- Occupations: Leadership speaker, executive coach, writer, CEO of Libby Gill & Company
- Children: 2
- Website: www.libbygill.com

Libby Gill is an American speaker, coach, and author from Los Angeles, California. She is the CEO of Libby Gill & Company. She was also the Senior Vice President at Universal Studios Television, Vice President at Sony Pictures Television, and Turner Broadcasting.

She is a former columnist for The Dallas Morning News.

== Early life and education ==
Gill was born in New York and raised in Mandarin, Florida. She subsequently lived in Yokosuka, Japan and Manhattan Beach and Los Angeles California. She was one of six children and the daughter of a psychiatrist. She attended California State University, Long Beach and earned a degree in theater.

== Career ==
In 1995, she was appointed to senior vice president of media relations at the Universal Television group. Gill had senior positions at Turner Broadcasting and Sony Pictures Entertainment for fifteen years before founding Libby Gill & Company, an executive coaching and consulting firm, in November 2000. Her clients include AMC Networks, Avery Dennison, CA Technologies, Disney-ABC, Kellogg's, Microsoft, PayPal, Wells Fargo, and others.

She began writing about her experiences as an executive and teaching at California State, Northridge. She authored seven books and shared her experiences in Time, The New York Times, and The Wall Street Journal.

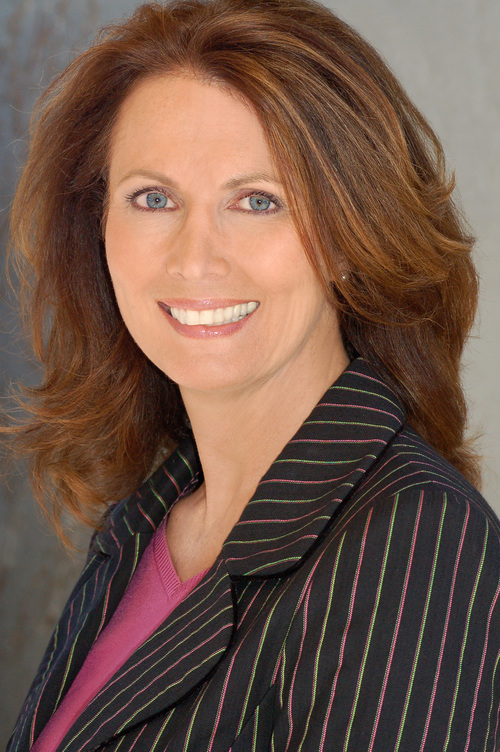
Gill in 2006

Stay-At-Home Dads (2001) was written about her family's experiences when she was making more money than her husband and they decided he would be a stay-at-home dad. The journal, Adolescence, called it a "step by step blueprint for transitioning into a stay-at-home-dad family."

Traveling Hopefully: How to Lose Your Baggage and Jumpstart Your Life (2005) includes personal stories from her own childhood traumas. In 2010, Gill's book You Unstuck: Mastering the New Rules of Risk-taking in Work and Life (2009) won an Independent Publishers Award in 2010. She earned a silver award and was tied with Leanne Cusumano Roque who wrote Live Light: Simple Steps.

Gill was the media consultant for the Dr Phil television show. The Desert Sun called her "the brains behind the Dr. Phil show."

== Personal life ==
Gill lives in Medford, Oregon with her husband, attorney David Stern, and is the mother of two sons.

== Bibliography ==
- Malibu Summer: A Novel (2024), ASIN B0CHVB3HDZ
- Leadership Reckoning: Can Higher Education Develop the Leaders We Need? (2021, with Thomas Kolditz and Ryan P. Brown), ISBN 978-1952938368
- The Hope-Driven Leader: Harness the Power of Positivity at Work (2018), ISBN 978-1635763751
- Capture the Mindshare and the Market Share Will Follow: The Art and Science of Building Brands (2013), ISBN 978-1137278517
- You Unstuck: Mastering the New Rules of Risk-Taking at Work and in Life (2009), ISBN 978-1932361681
- Traveling Hopefully: How to Lose Your Family Baggage and Jumpstart Your Life (2005), ISBN 0-312-32394-8
- Stay-At-Home Dads: The Essential Guide to Creating the New Family (2001), ISBN 0-452-28274-8
