= Jacksonville–Baldwin Rail Trail =

Rail trail in Florida

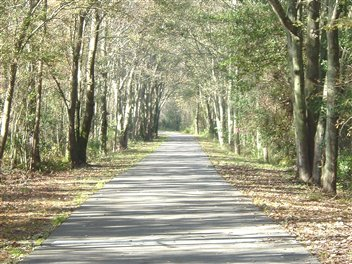

- Location within Florida
- Location: Duval County, Florida, USA
- Nearest city: Jacksonville, Florida
- Coordinates: 30°20′42″N 81°46′27″W
- Area: 14.5-mile (23.3 km) length
- Created: 1991
- Operator: City of Jacksonville, Department of Parks & Recreation

The Jacksonville–Baldwin Rail Trail is a rail trail that extends from northwest Jacksonville to Baldwin, Florida. While it is technically a city park, it includes three separate paths: a multi-use asphalt trail for hiking, jogging, in-line skating or cycling; an off-road bike trail; and a horseback riding trail.

== History ==
The City of Jacksonville purchased an unused east/west former Atlantic Coast Line Railroad corridor from CSX Transportation Inc. in December 1992, in conjunction with the Florida Greenways and Trails Program and with approval of the Florida Department of Environmental Protection. The railroad line was originally part of the former Jacksonville and Southwestern Railroad. The trail runs from Jacksonville’s Imeson Road to Brandy Branch Road near Baldwin for a distance of approximately 14.5-mile (23.3 km). It is 100-foot (30 m) wide, with a 12-foot (3.7 m) asphalt thoroughfare suitable for nonmotorized wheeled conveyances, such as bicycles and wheelchairs.

== Trail Buffer ==
All of the Jacksonville Baldwin Rails to Trails Buffer Preserve was purchased with grants from the Florida Communities Trust (FCT), which has provided funding for local communities and eligible non-profit organizations to acquire land for parks, greenways and open spaces since 1991. FCT Grant No. 01-120-FF1 included the following properties: Scarborough, Block, Old Plank Land Trust, Garner and Campbell. The Forbess and Walker properties were purchased with the help of FCT Grant No. 04-052-FF4. The conceptual site plan for the Scarborough and Block properties shows hiking, biking, and equestrian trails throughout the properties, plus parking lots to provide more access to the Rail Trail. Picnic pavilions and wildlife observation platforms will also be included. The conceptual site plan for the 491-acre (1.99 km^{2}) Forbess and Walker properties proposed an equestrian cool-down facility, restrooms, picnic pavilions, a horseshoe pit, a volleyball court, a parking area, an equestrian trail, a hiking trail and a biking trail, as well as upland and wetland restoration. As of 2008, those projects, with the exception of the trails themselves, were still in the planning stage.

== Recreational activities ==
Hikers, joggers, skateboarders, rollerbladers, unicyclists and tricyclists can all enjoy the byway. Horseback riders can utilize an equestrian trail, completed in the Spring of 2002, which runs parallel to the paved trail. There is also a separate trail for BMX bicyclists.

The trail passes through well-kept residential areas as it leaves the city, then a rural area includes mobile homes, abandoned cars, shadetree mechanics and a power plant. A gun range near the trail generates rifle and pistol fire. Eventually, the trail passes through flatwoods, wetlands, and hardwood uplands which support populations of birds (including hawks, buzzards & wild turkeys), squirrels, rabbits, raccoons, opossum, armadillos, gopher tortoises, snakes and white-tailed deer. The trail is densely shaded by vegetation that is in some places so thick that it is difficult to see other features of the landscape. The trail is open from sunrise until sunset, 365 days a year.

== Camp Milton ==
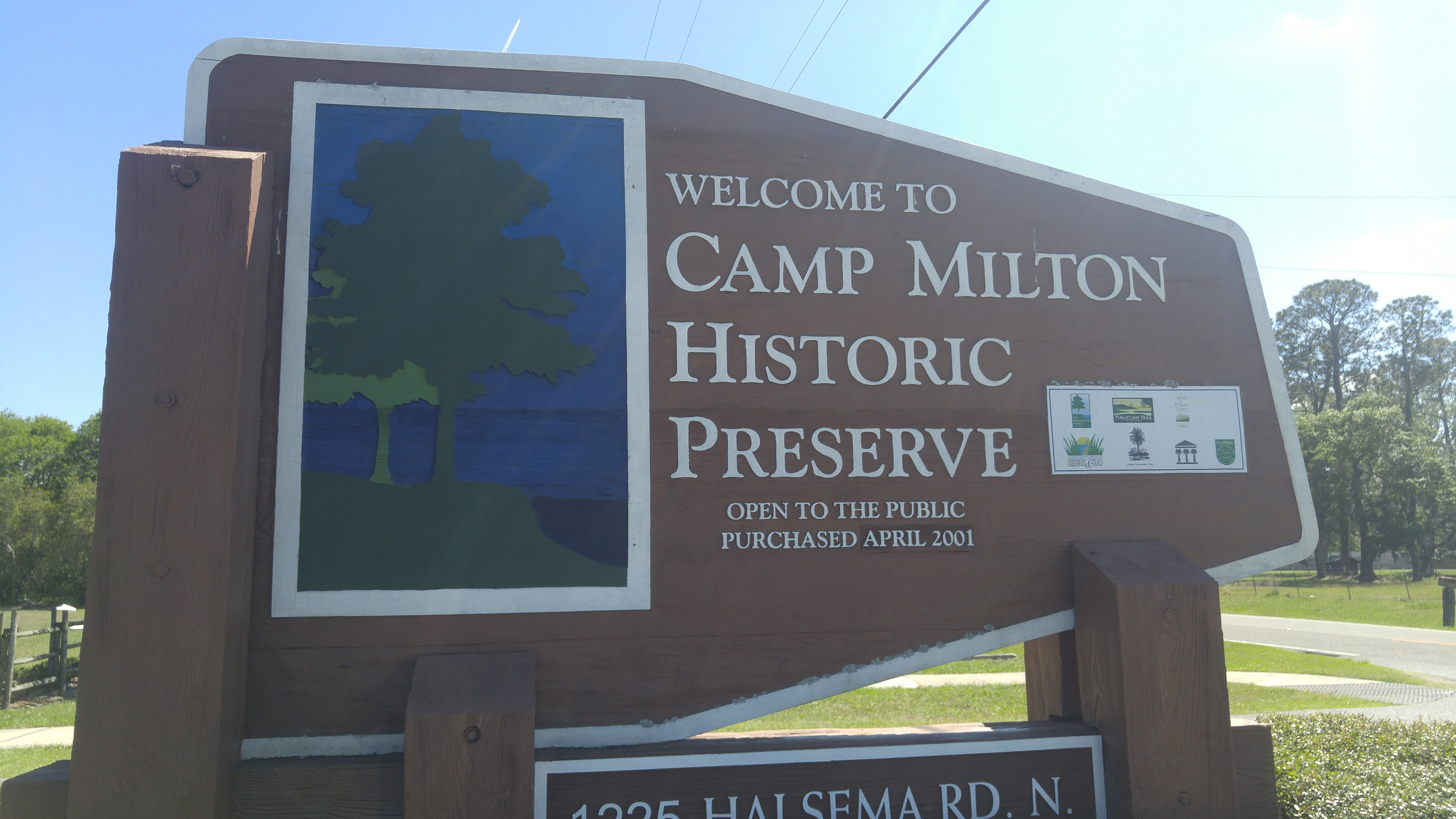
Camp Milton Historic Preserve's sign

The trail comes close to its midpoint to the Civil War Camp Milton Historic Preserve. With three miles (5 km) of fortifications constructed of earth and timber in February & March 1864, Camp Milton was "first line of defense against the Union forces in Jacksonville in 1864, with over 8,000 troops. Named after Florida's Governor during the Civil War, John Milton, the camp was the site of several encounters (not battles) between Confederate and Union armies before the camp was occupied by the Union army in the summer of 1864. Work on the preserve is relatively recent. After the 1973 discovery of the site, the property was purchased by the State of Florida in 1981. The City of Jacksonville, with the assistance of Preservation Project Jacksonville, purchased the initial tract from the state in April 2001 and later expanded it with additional purchases. In September 2006, the completed preserve, including an educational center, replicas and a preserved Florida cracker farmstead, was opened for public use.
