= Okeehumkee =

Steamboat in 19th-century Florida

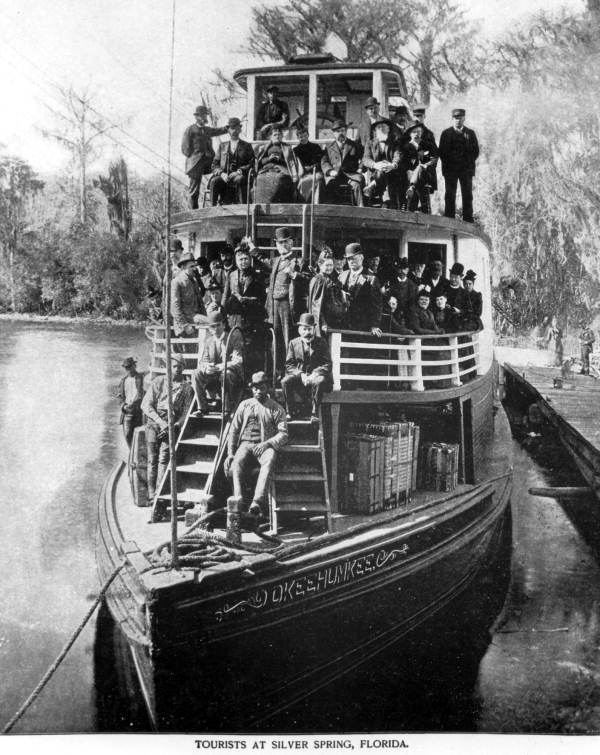
- Okeehumkee at Silver Springs, Florida
- Name: Okeehumkee
- Owner: Hubbard L. Hart
- Operator: Hubbard L. Hart
- Route: Ocklawaha River
- Builder: Hubbard L. Hart
- Completed: 1873
- Out of service: 1919
- Identification: 19409
- Fate: Drydock
- Type: Paddle wheel steamboat
- Tonnage: 65
- Length: 84.4 feet (25.7 m)
- Beam: 21.4 feet (6.5 m)
- Draught: 3 feet (0.91 m)
- Depth: 8.3 feet (2.5 m)
- Decks: 3
- Installed power: Steam
- Propulsion: Paddle wheel

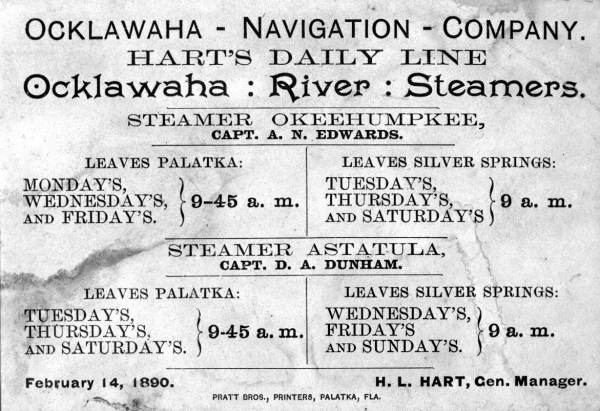
Hart's Daily Line Schedule Card dated February 14, 1890.

The Okeehumkee, also known as "Queen of the Ocklawaha River," was a river steamboat that provided transportation along Florida rivers in the late 19th century. The Okeehumkee was equipped with a paddle wheel positioned in the lower stern part of the boat which allowed it to traverse narrow and shallow rivers. The steamboat was the longest-serving craft of its type on the Ocklawaha River route, remaining in service for 43 years.

== Description ==
The Okeehumkee measured 84.4 feet (25.7 m) long by 21.4 feet (6.5 m) wide, and consisted of a flat-bottom hull, a lower cargo deck and two upper passenger decks. A recessed stern paddle wheel provided propulsion, powered by a wood-burning steam boiler engine. The boat was outfitted with shutters on the windows to keep tree branches out and a livestock pen at the rear of the boat, on the upper deck. The Okeehumkee was alternately called Okeehumkee II, Okahumka, Okahumpka, and Okeehumpkee.

== History ==
The Okeehumkee was built in 1873 by Hubbard Hart, founder of the Ocklawaha Navigation Company's Hart's Line, at his East Palatka Hart's Point shipyard. It was named after a Native American chief from the area of the Ocklawaha lakes. The boat was outfitted with shutters on the windows to keep tree branches out and a livestock pen at the rear of the boat, on the upper deck. The boat was altered several times throughout its service lifetime, including moving the pilot house to the top deck. In 1893, a second deck of cabins was added. The Okeehumkee was alternately called Okeehumkee II, Okahumka, Okahumpka, and Okeehumkee.

In 1886, the boat was altered to expand the upper cabin deck in both length and width. Over the next several years, other minor alterations were made. In 1893, another cabin deck was added.

The Okeehumkee was still in service as of 1910. The steamboat era declined in the early 20th century, replaced by railroad travel. In 1919, Hart's Line ceased operation and the Okeehumkee was moored at Hart's Point shipyard in East Palatka along with another steamboat, the Hiawatha. By the late 1930s, the Okeehumkee had been dismantled.
