= Klutho Park =

Park in Jacksonville, Florida

Henry J. Klutho Park
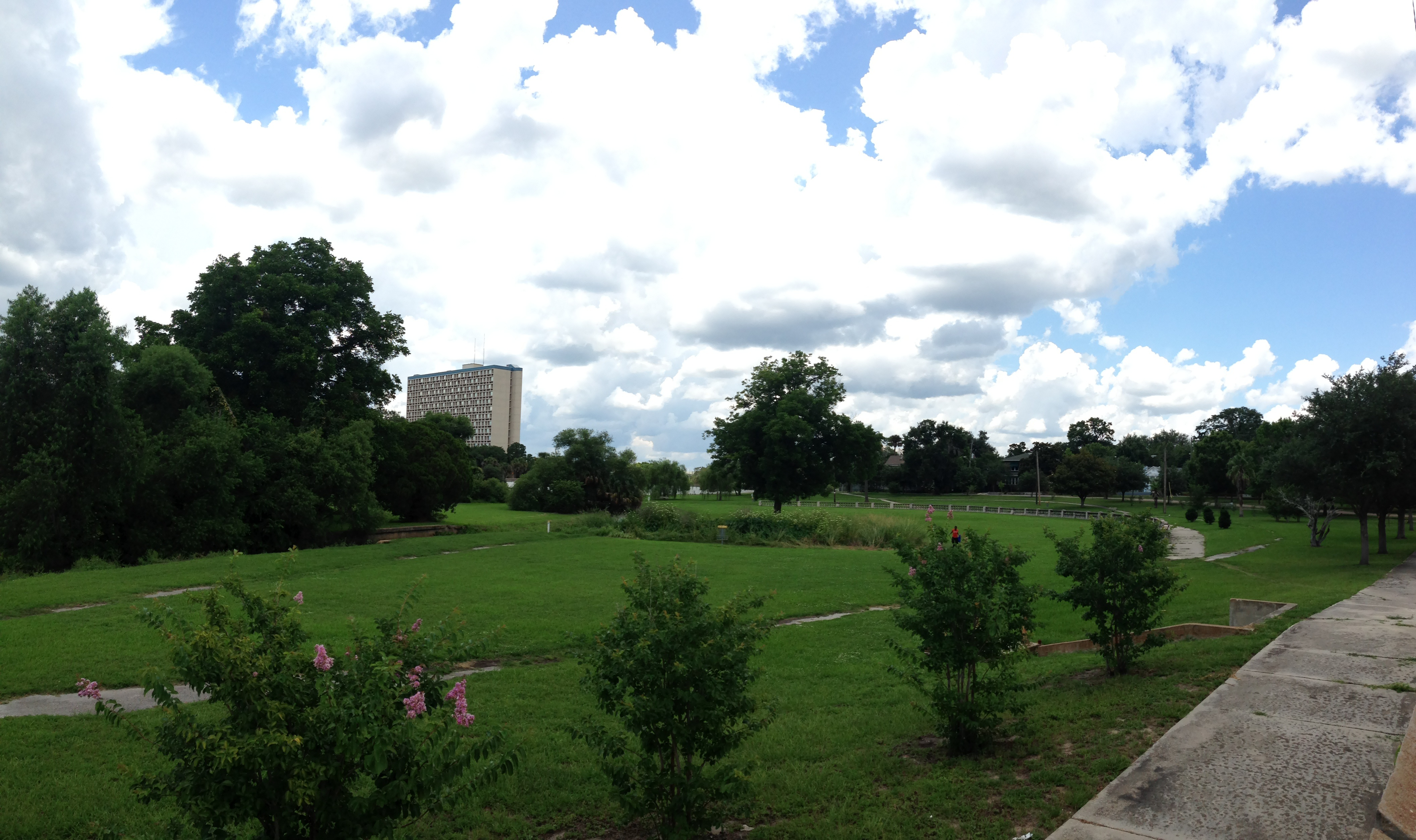
- Interactive map of Henry J. Klutho Park
- Type: Municipal (Parks & Recreation Department)
- Location: Jacksonville, Florida
- Coordinates: 30°20′20″N 81°39′31″W
- Area: 18.34 acres (74,200 m^{2})
- Created: 1899
- Operator: City of Jacksonville
- Status: Open year round

Henry J. Klutho Park is an 18.34-acre (74,200 m^{2}) public park, located between downtown Jacksonville, Florida and the historic neighborhood of Springfield. It is part of a network of parks that parallel Hogans Creek, Klutho Park being the largest. Klutho Park is home to an 18-hole disc golf course.

== History ==
Formerly known as Springfield Park, most of the park was created between 1899 and 1901 on land donated by the Springfield Company. The park also once housed the city’s first zoo, opening at the park in 1914. The Hogans Creek Improvement Project of 1929–30, designed by architect Henry J. Klutho (1873–1964) and engineered by Charles Imeson, turned much of the park grounds into a Venetian-style promenade. Klutho was a well-respected Springfield resident. His highrise buildings and use of the Prairie School style of architecture transformed Jacksonville after the Great Fire of 1901. In 1984, the City of Jacksonville renamed portions of Springfield Park in honor of Klutho.
