= Hubbard L. Hart =

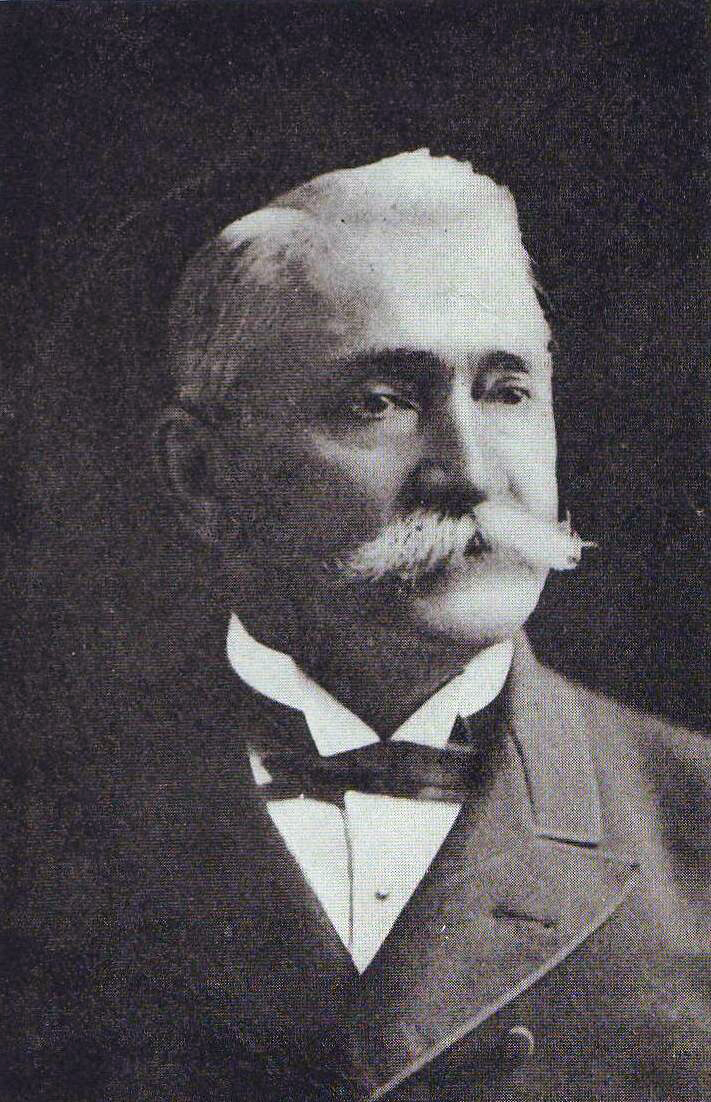
- Born: May 4, 1827; Guilford, Vermont
- Died: December 12, 1895; Atlanta, Georgia
- Occupations: owned steamships, hotels, orange groves and lumber mills
- Known for: helping Florida develop as a tourist destination
- Spouses: Mary Adams; Cecilia Thompson

Hubbard L. Hart (May 4, 1827 – December 12, 1895) was an American entrepreneur who ran the most prominent steamboat line in Florida. He augmented his business with hotels, orange groves and lumber mills, and is noted for helping the state develop as a tourist destination.

== Mail carrier ==
Hart was born in Guilford, Vermont. He was married to Mary Adams of Cavendish, Vermont until her death in 1880. He then married Cecilia Thompson of Boston, Massachusetts in 1884. At the age of 21, he moved to Savannah, Georgia, and then later Darien, Georgia. He finally moved to Palatka, Florida in 1855. In July of that year, he got a contract as a mail carrier for a route from Ocala to Tampa, even though there was danger of Seminole Indian attacks. This mail route took him by the emerging village at Silver Springs, and this gave him an idea—he recognized the region's natural beauty and climate as a vacation draw for northerners, weary of cold, bleak winters.

== Steamboat and lumber executive ==
In 1860, at 33 years old, Hart bought the paddle-wheel steamer, James Burt. He used the boat to transport people and supplies between Palatka and Silver Springs. The tourist route lasted 2-days, and went down the Ocklawaha River from Palatka to Silver Springs and back. The roads at the time were very poor, but boat transport was faster and safer. James Burt was also used to move lumber from Hart’s new cypress lumbering enterprise. His new business, the Hart Line, needed to clear the wood and debris from the Ocklawaha.

== Confederate patronage ==
At the start of the Civil War, the Hart Line needed to adapt or die. Due to no tourism during the war, Hart decided to use his steamers to transport supplies for the Confederate States. He helped with blockade running, which was done by transporting supplies up the center of the state through a series of land and river routes. During the Civil War, he made a total of CSA$11,000, which he managed to turn into material assets by the end of the war to avoid losing everything in the collapsing government. Near the end of the war, the Confederates saw the strategic value of the Ocklawaha River and hired Hart to clear it of all debris and navigation hazards for a price of CSA$4500. He did not get a chance to finish before the rebellion was over.

Hart left the war with the title of colonel. He was cleared of any wartime crimes and allowed to resume his tourist industry. He used his boats to transport Union men and supplies in the winter of 1865-66, proving his allegiance to the federal government.

== Tourism boom ==
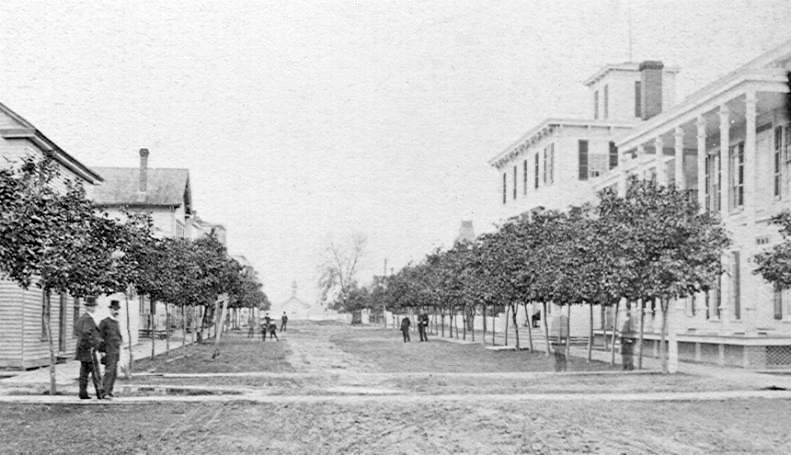
The Putnam House c. 1880, Hart's hotel lost in the Palatka fire of November 7, 1884 but soon rebuilt, reopening January 26, 1886

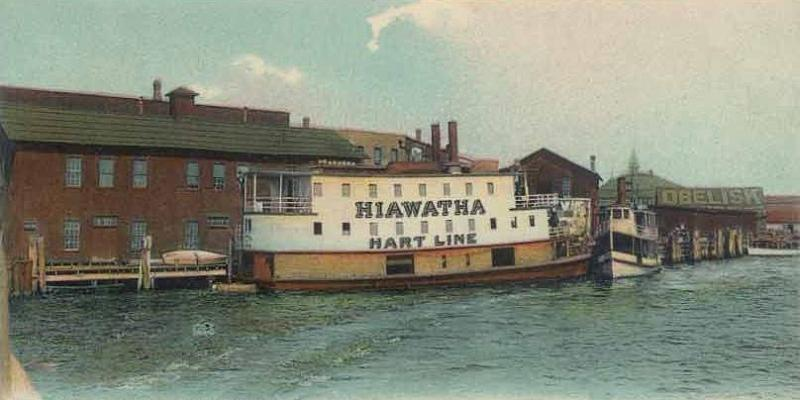
Hiawatha, the largest and last of the Ocklawaha River steamers

His business grew. He eventually had to design a new type of boat to navigate the narrow river, filled with obstacles that would sink most rear-paddle boats. Hubbard Hart invented the first inboard-paddle boat in 1866, launching the Griffin. This new design of boat was featured in the 1892 Chicago World's Fair. In the following three years, Hart Lines also added the Ocklawaha and Pansoffkee to the fleet. The James Burt had been sunk in the Civil War, and the Silver Springs was decommissioned with the new boats. While the new boats were described as ugly, trips on them received nothing but positive reviews. Harriet Beecher Stowe, who was first afraid to board the boats, wrote nothing but praise for the Hart Line. Attractions along the way included touring Hart’s world famous orange groves (which even allowed guests to pick some fruit), shooting wildlife (including alligators), admiring the rustic Florida beauty, and swimming in Silver Springs.

The Hart Line's success continued until a gradual downturn in business began in 1889. Freight business had been absorbed by railroads, leaving the competing steamboat lines dependent on tourists for revenue. Nevertheless, through hard work and dedication, Hart managed to keep the fleet running. His strategies included building luxury hotels along the way, renovating the boats to have bigger cabins, and offering cruises down different rivers, including the Indian River in 1883. He suffered a setback when his hotel, the Putnam House, burned down in the Palatka Fire of 1884, after being open only a short time.

In 1895, Hubbard Hart died as a result of a fall from a trolley car in Atlanta, Georgia, where he was attending a business meeting. Hart Lines was taken over by his brother-in-law and remained operating into the 1920s, when automobile travel rendered it obsolete.
