= Jacksonville Arboretum & Botanical Gardens =

Non-profit organization in Jacksonville, Florida

- Formation: March 2004
- Type: Non-profit
- Legal status: Corporation
- Purpose: Arboretum and botanical garden
- Region served: Jacksonville metropolitan area
- CEO: Dana J. Doody
- Main organ: Board of Directors
- Location: 1445 Millcoe Road
- Nearest city: Jacksonville, Florida, USA
- Coordinates: 30.3462°N 81.5396°W
- Area: 135.82-acre (54.96 ha)
- Created: November 15, 2008
- Open: 8am - 5pm, 365 days/year
- Awards: Civic Horticultural Leadership Award; HandsOn Earth Award
- Website: jacksonvillearboretum.org

The Jacksonville Arboretum & Botanical Gardens (JABG) is a 501(c)(3) non-profit organization in Jacksonville, Florida. Established to preserve and showcase Northeast Florida's natural beauty, the Arboretum encompasses 135.82-acres (54.96 ha) featuring diverse ecosystems, natural habitats, botanical collections, and trails. JABG is dedicated to cultivating understanding and wonder by engaging the community through environmental education, recreation, community events, and the natural beauty of Northeast Florida.

== History ==
Between 1941 and 1961, the Humphries Gold Mining Company harvested zircon and other minerals required for the production of titanium. Strip-mining removed organic matter and nutrients from the soil, which left white sand, barren of vegetation. After mining ended, it became an urban wild and unofficial dump site for appliances, cars, tires and other junk.

The city of Jacksonville purchased the property for use as a buffer from a wastewater treatment plant during the 1970s, and left alone for thirty years, 13 separate ecosystems developed, including oak hammock, fresh water ravine, upland sand hill and salt marsh.

A group of conservation-minded nature lovers recognized the site's value and founded the Jacksonville Arboretum & Gardens (JAG) as a non-profit organization in March, 2004. Professionals with knowledge of science, nature or design were recruited for the board of directors.

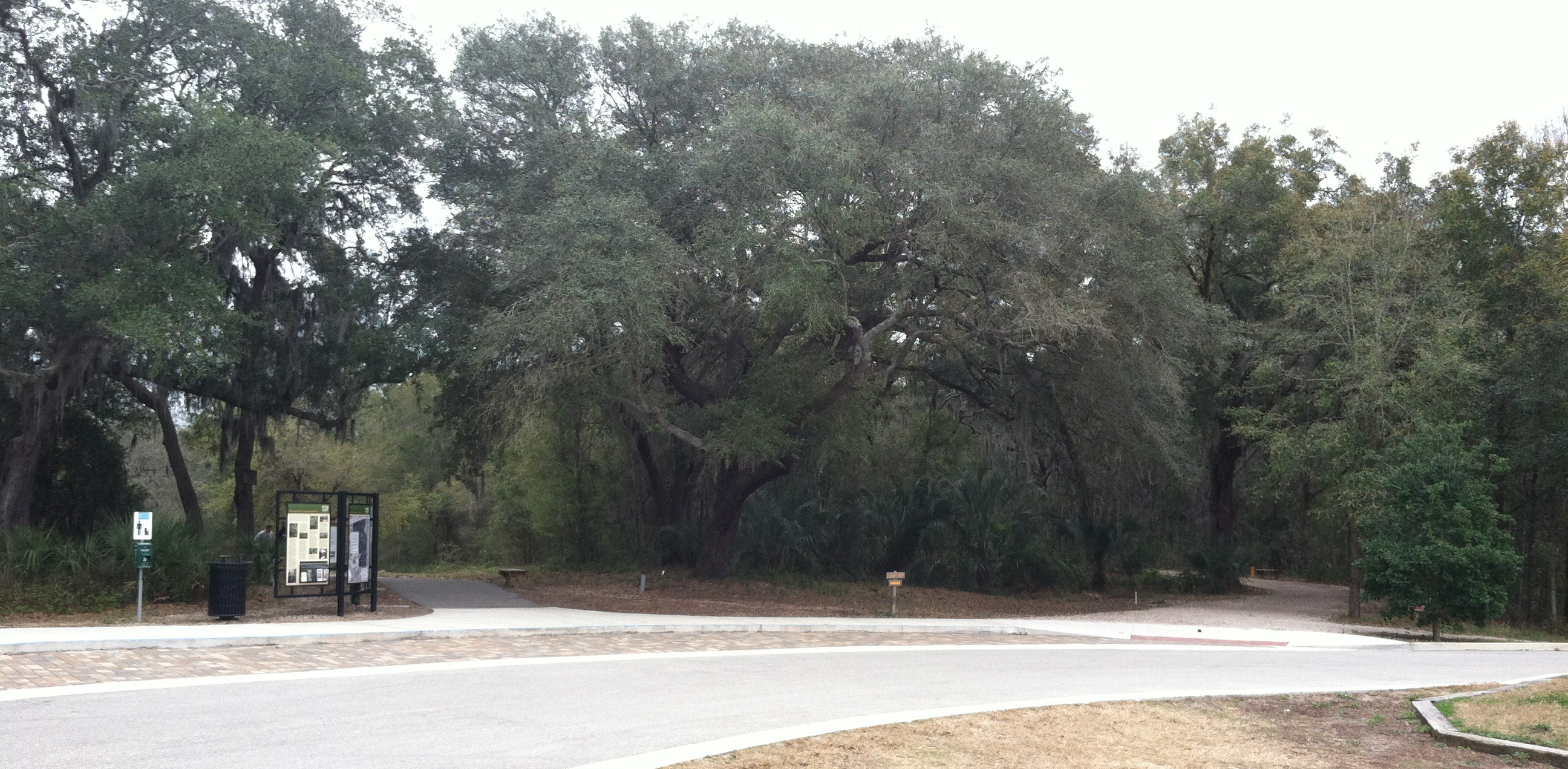
Trail beginning view from parking lot

In 2006, the Jacksonville City Council approved bill number 2006-234, which granted a 20-year lease and $250,000 to pay for paving the parking area, creating a development plan, and construction of a walking trail. The tract was surveyed and mapped, a master plan was created, support was solicited from local businesses, and volunteers began to remove dumped junk and shape the landscape.

A colony of gopher tortoises required relocation when the parking lot was constructed. The Florida Fish and Wildlife Conservation Commission approved a location on the north side of the property as a relocation site for gopher tortoises. Area builders who need to remove the protected species from a construction site can use the JAG—for a $500 donation.

The Arboretum officially opened on November 15, 2008, and the Sierra Club of Northeast Florida stated, "Development of this park is truly a community project of a size and scope never before undertaken by a volunteer organization."

While the Arboretum began as a volunteer-run organization, it is now staff run.

== Features ==
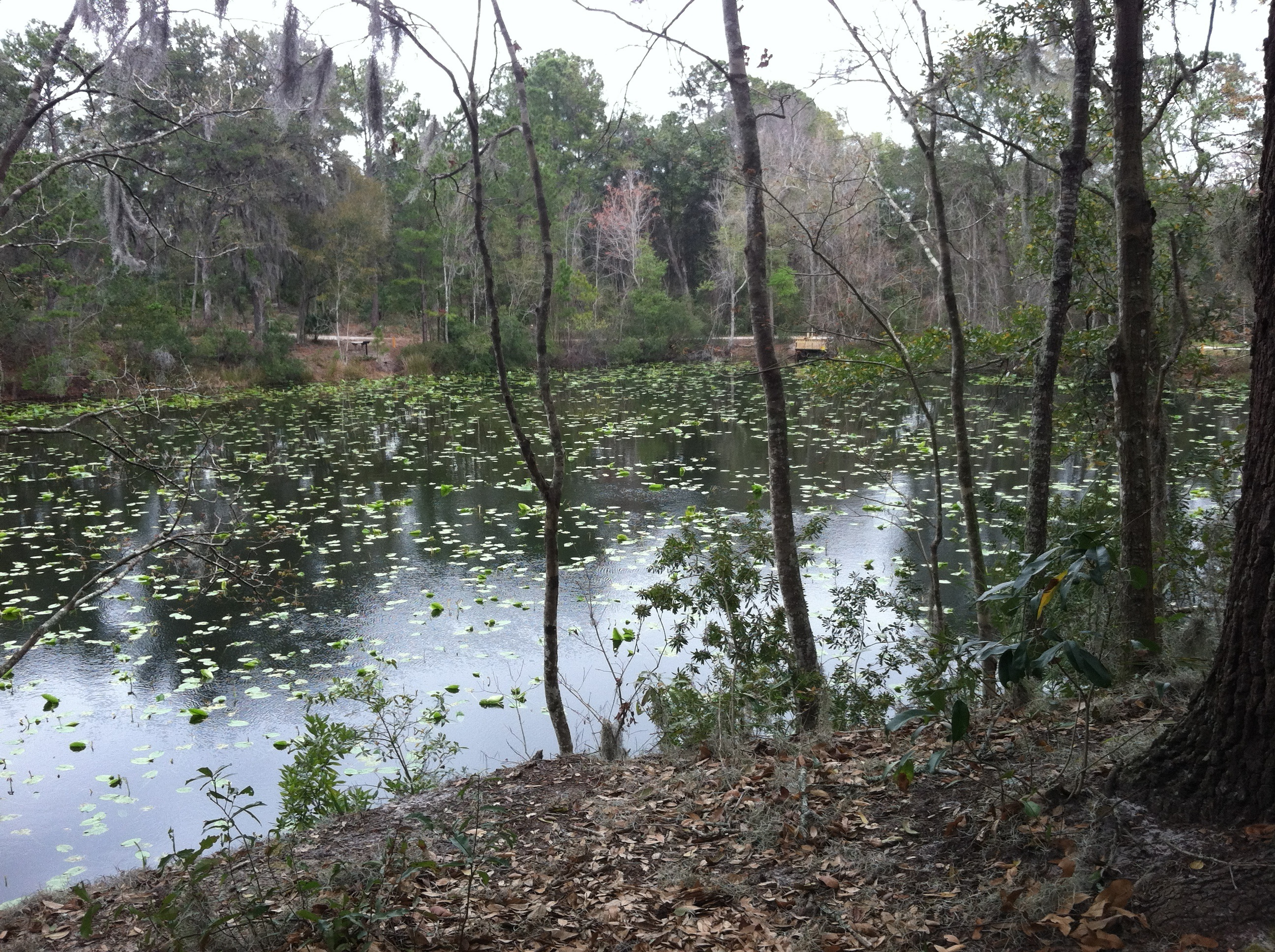
Lake Ray

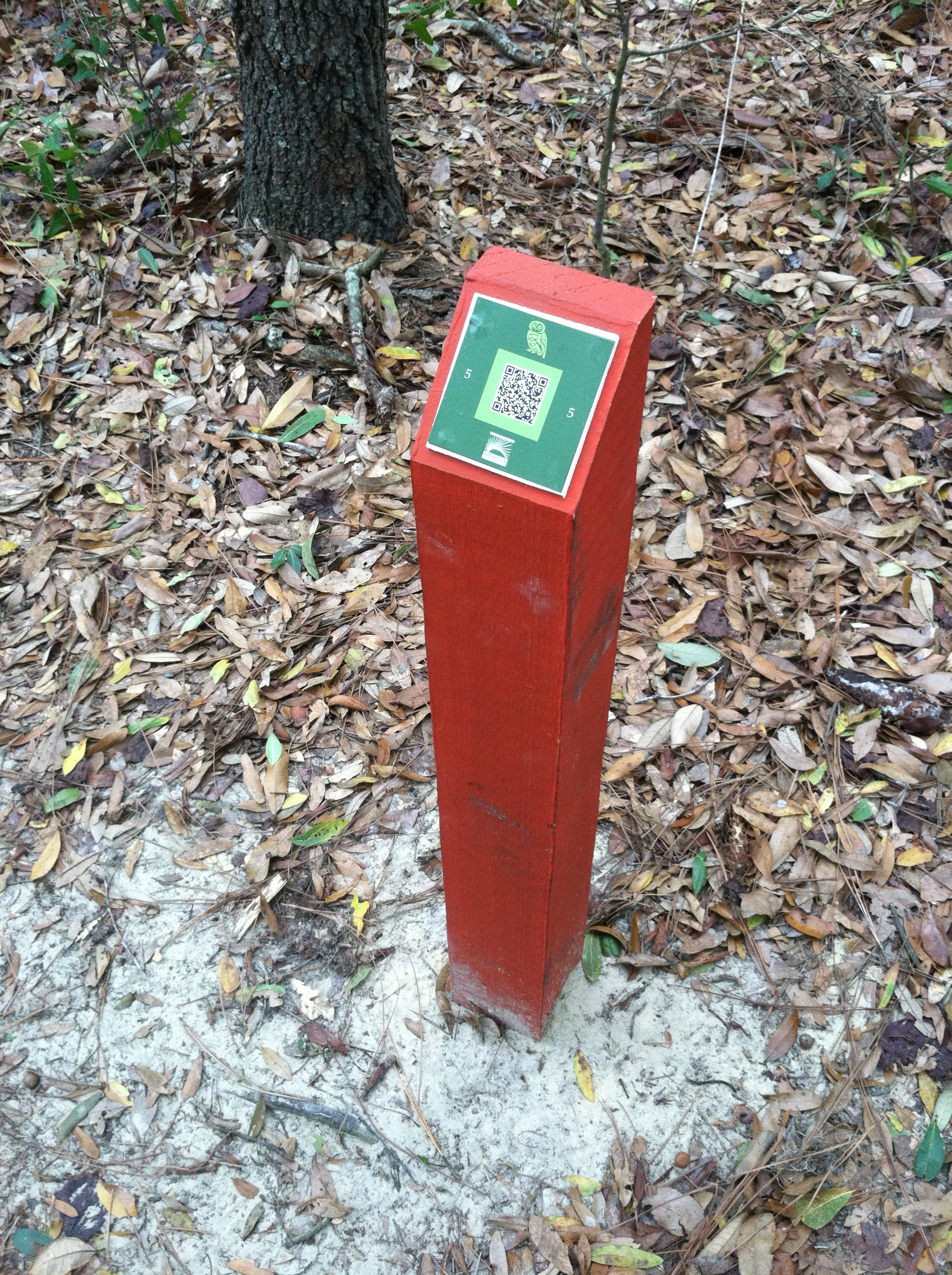
Information post

The terrain is not flat like most of Jacksonville; it has a ravine 800 feet long and sloping hills. Alligator, snakes, lizards, foxes, squirrels, turtles and armadillo make their home at JAG, as well as hawks, osprey, owls, and numerous species of smaller birds.

The Lake Loop encircles a two-acre lake, a borrow pit dug in the 1970s. The Lake Loop has now been regraded so that it has an accessible 5% slope. Numerous species of ethnobotanical interest have been planted in areas around the lake. Local trees such as pignut hickory, tulip poplar, loblolly pine, longleaf pine, southern magnolia, black cherry, laurel oak and live oak still form the canopy.

The Jones Creek Trail wanders through swamp bay, tupelo, swamp dogwood, American hornbeam and bald cypress along and across Jones Creek, a tributary of the St. Johns River. Osmunda regalis (royal fern), Osmunda cinnamomea (cinnamon fern), and Woodwardia aereolata (net leaf chain fern) also abound.

The Ravine Trail follows the rim of the 185 feet wide by 25 feet deep ravine with a stream flowing at the bottom. Among the species nearby are swamp azalea, black walnut, and the national champion loblolly-bay.

In the spring of 2009, the Live Oak Trail was completed. Many of the live oak trees along the trail are over a century old.

Educational signs can be found throughout the arboretum which identify tree species and provide information about habitats. Point of interest codes are also posted for scanning by visitors with a Smartphone. Ron Littlepage, a columnist for the Florida Times-Union called it "one of our area's great parks".

== Projects ==
The second Saturday of each month is a volunteer work day, but individual groups have completed special projects at other times. Church groups have built two bridges, Eagle Scouts have constructed bridges, fences, trails, and benches. Funding for larger projects comes from numerous sources. A grant from JEA funded the installation of an accessible pit toilet and a lakeside pavilion. The city tree fund helped purchase over 400 trees and shrubs around the lake. Recreational Equipment Inc (REI) funded regrading a portion of the Jones Creek Trail and installation of accessible creekside seating. The original educational signs were donated by Greenscapes of Jacksonville. Local garden clubs have donated educational signs, benches, and the patio for the pavilion. Pooled donations from members and friends and earned income from events have funded installation of prefabricated storage and maintenance sheds, building two boardwalks, and regrading the Lake Loop to under 5% slope.

== Incident ==
In late September 2010, thieves broke into the on-site storage container and stole all of JAG's gas-powered tools, including a backpack blower, hand blower, chainsaw, and two weed wackers. They also took the organization's All-terrain vehicle. The $10,000 loss was not covered by insurance. None of the gear was ever recovered, but most of the equipment was replaced by generous individuals.

== Awards ==
The Jacksonville Arboretum and Botanical Gardens was honored with the Civic Horticultural Leadership Award from Greenscape of Jacksonville at Mayor John Peyton's Environmental Luncheon on April 3, 2009. JAG was also the recipient of the 2010, HandsOn Earth Award from HandsOn Jacksonville.

== Future plans ==
The Conceptual Master Site Plan is a wish list for the next decade and beyond. It includes a visitor center, greenhouse, event lawn, and ethnobotanical gardens.

== See also ==
- List of botanical gardens in the United States
