= Mandarin (Jacksonville) =

Neighborhood in Jacksonville, Florida, United States

Mandarin is a neighborhood located in the southernmost portion of Jacksonville, in Duval County, Florida, United States. It is located on the eastern banks of the St. Johns River, across from Orange Park. It is a short drive south of Jacksonville's city center, and is bordered by Beauclerc to the north, Julington Creek to the south and St. John's River to the west.

Once called "a tropical paradise" by author and notable resident Harriet Beecher Stowe, Mandarin is known for its history, ancient oak trees draped with Spanish moss, parks, marinas and water views.

== History ==
The area was established by the British in the 1760s, including the 10,000-acre plantation created by Francis Levett Sr. The Levetts cultivated a variety of crops and used enslaved people for this operation. The Treaty of Paris returned the area to Spain in 1783. Many other plantations were established under the Spanish, including the notable Kingsley Plantation.

In 1830, Mandarin was named after the mandarin orange by Calvin Reed, a prominent resident of the area. In the 19th century, Mandarin was a small farming village that shipped oranges, grapefruit, lemons and other fruits and vegetables to Jacksonville and points north on the steamships that traveled the St. Johns River. Zephaniah Kingsley purchased land in the area in 1814, and brought with him his enslaved wife, Anna Kingsley. "She actively participated in plantation management, acquiring her own land and slaves when freed by Kingsley in 1811."

In 1864, the Union steamship Maple Leaf hit a Confederate mine and sank just off Mandarin Point.

In the post-Reconstruction period, the majority of the residents, according to the censuses of 1870 and 1880, were African American. Three churches were established in the area, including the Philip R Cousin AME Church, founded in 1886. The majority of the land was planted with orange trees for many years, but a freeze in the early 1890s destroyed a lot of the crop. Orange farmers decided not to replant their destroyed trees; instead, they sold off former groveland to developers.

=== Harriet Beecher Stowe ===
In 1867, Harriet Beecher Stowe, the author of Uncle Tom's Cabin, bought a cottage in Mandarin. For the next seventeen winters, she welcomed tourists debarking from the steamers along the St. Johns River.

Although best known for her novel about the cruelty of slavery, Stowe also wrote about Florida. She had promised her Boston publisher another novel, but was so taken with northeast Florida that she produced instead a series of sketches of the land and the people. She submitted it in 1872 under the title Palmetto Leaves. Her second book did not outsell her first novel, but did have the effect of drawing rich and fashionable tourists to visit her.

In Palmetto Leaves, Stowe describes life in Florida in the latter half of the 19th century; "a tumble-down, wild, panicky kind of life—this general happy-go-luckiness which Florida inculcates." Her idyllic sketches of picnicking, sailing, and river-touring expeditions; and simple stories of events and people in this tropical "winter summer" land became the first unsolicited promotional writing to interest northern tourists in Florida. A small chapel in Mandarin is dedicated to the author.

=== 20th century ===
In 1968, the city of Jacksonville and most of Duval County formed a consolidated municipal unit. As part of this process, Mandarin ceased to exist as a political entity, and became part of the city of Jacksonville.

In 1990, with the rapid growth of Mandarin, a new public high school was opened in the area. Several prominent citizens in Jacksonville urged that the new school be named Harriet Beecher Stowe High School, but the proposal did not receive widespread acceptance. The school was named Mandarin High School. An historical museum was founded in 1989, called The Mandarin Museum & Historical Society. It restored the Mandarin Historic Post Office and Walter Jones General Store. In 2000, the city opened the Walter Jones Historical Park, a 10-acre park, on the site. "The Mandarin Museum & Historical Society also acquired other historic structures to add to the park. These include an early 20th-century saw mill and a late 19th-century log cabin belonging to the Losco family, which was part of the largest wine operation in Northeast Florida". The 1898 St. Joseph's Mission Schoolhouse for African-American Children was moved to the museum property and opened to the public in 2016. The displays in the schoolhouse reflect the African American and Gullah Geechee heritage in Mandarin. In 2020, Mandarin had a population of approximately 9,000 residents and 3,800 households.

== Geography ==
Mandarin is located at 30°09′37″N 81°39′34″W (30.1603, -81.6594).

=== Famous residents ===
- Allen Collins from the rock band Lynyrd Skynyrd resided some of his last years in Mandarin.
- Consumer advocate Joe Cury lived and worked in Mandarin.
- Business coach and consultant Libby Gill grew up in Mandarin.
- United States Congresswoman Val Demings was born and grew up in Mandarin.

== Landmarks ==
The Lofton Cemetery, with marked headstones dated as far back as 1891, is in zip code 32223. The Mandarin Cemetery is situated on a site once part of the Seminole Wars. It also contains many historically important gravestones, going back to the 1800s.

== See also ==
- Neighborhoods of Jacksonville
- Southside, Jacksonville
