= Florida Communities Trust =

The Florida Communities Trust (FCT) is a governmental land acquisition program in the state of Florida, United States, administered by the Florida Department of Community Affairs (DCA). Grants are awarded annually on a competitive basis to local governments and non-profit environmental organizations for community-based parks, open space and greenways. These projects must further outdoors recreation and natural resources protection needs identified in the local government's Comprehensive Plans.

The program helps Florida communities meet growth management challenges, protects the state's natural and cultural resources, and helps meet recreational needs. The program is funded by 22% of the Florida Forever (FF) funds, $66 million each year. Counties with a population of 75,000 or more are required to provide matching funds equal to 25% of the total project cost. Non-profit organizations are exempt from this requirement. The maximum application grant is $6.6 million per year.

== History ==
The Florida Communities Trust was established in 1989 to help local governments acquire land for open spaces, natural areas, parks and beaches. Initially, it was under control of the Florida Department of Environmental Protection, but later shifted to the Department of Community Affairs. FCT projects improve the quality of life for the residents of Florida. Grants from the Parks and Open Space program fund regional and local parks, which encourage nature-based tourism, promote community revitalization and economic growth. Through the 1990s, it was funded by the Preservation 2000 bond program, which was replaced by the Florida Forever Act.

== Governance ==
Land purchased using state FCT money includes a set of restrictions, covenants and ownership rights, which always revert to the state if any problem arises with the land's use or the entity that received the original grant.

The Naples Zoo in Collier County intended to swap a six-acre county-owned parcel with an equal size parcel purchased with FCT funds. The state of Florida was not consulted about the trade, which required FCT approval. The state sent the county a "compliance warning" letter, voiding the original deal between the county and the zoo. After evaluating the situation, the FCT proposed that the FCT parcel could be used by the zoo if 43 acres of county land incur the restrictions that applied to the six acres.

After Rick Scott was elected as Florida's Governor in 2010, he vetoed funding for the popular land-acquisition program, Florida Forever, through which FCT is funded.
