= 1 Independent Square (Jacksonville) =

Skyscraper in Jacksonville, Florida

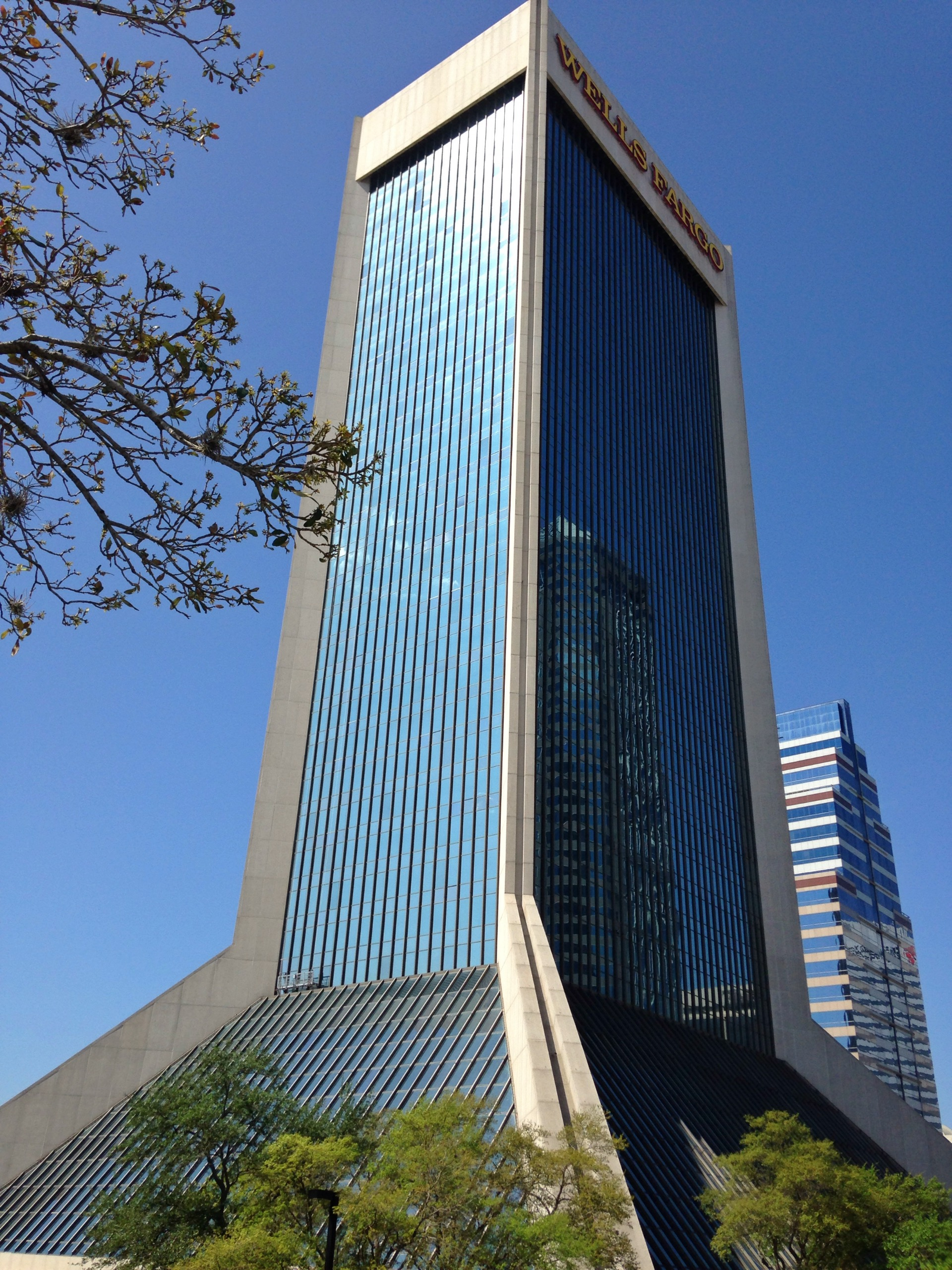
- Water Street entrance

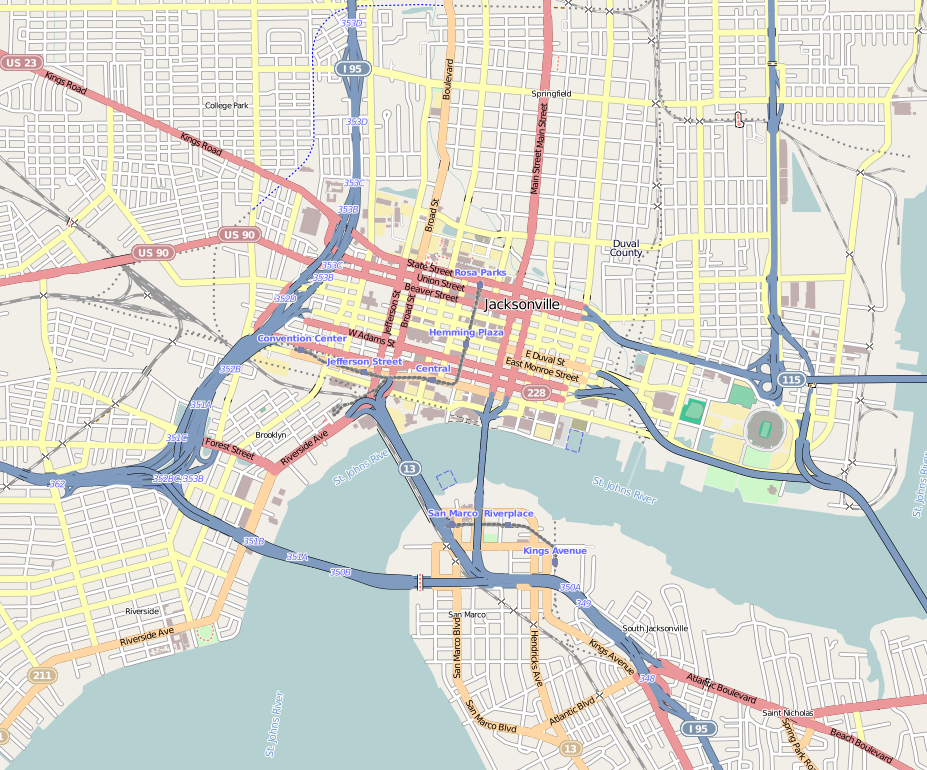
- Location within Central Jacksonville Location within Florida
- Former names: Independent Life Building; AccuStaff Building; Modis Building; Wells Fargo Center

General information
- Type: Office
- Architectural style: Modernist
- Location: One Independent Drive; Jacksonville, Florida
- Coordinates: 30.32579°N 81.65888°W
- Construction started: 1972
- Completed: 1974
- Opening: 1974

Height
- Antenna spire: 645 ft (197 m)
- Roof: 535 ft (163 m)

Technical details
- Floor count: 37
- Lifts/elevators: 15

Design and construction
- Architect: KBJ Architects
- Main contractor: The Auchter Company

1 Independent Square is a skyscraper in the downtown area of Jacksonville, Florida, located northwest of the Main Street Bridge and north of St. Johns River, at the southeast corner of Bay and Laura streets. Standing 535 feet (163 meters) tall, it is the city's second-tallest building. It was formerly known as the Modis Building until 2011, when Wells Fargo acquired the naming rights. From 2011 to 2024, it was known as the Wells Fargo Center. In July 2024, the building was renamed to 1 Independent Square after Wells Fargo did not renew its naming rights.

== History ==
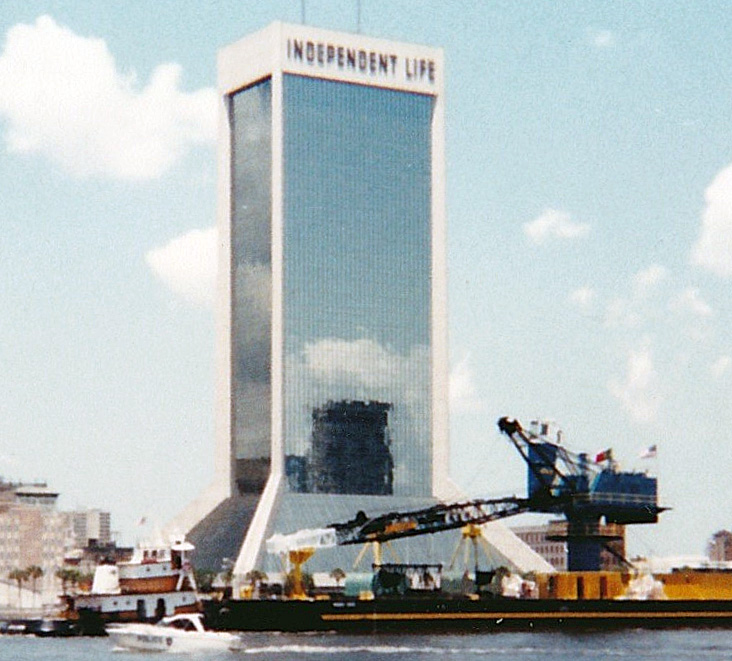
Independent Life around 1983

The tower was completed in 1974 by the Independent Life and Accident Insurance Company, and was known as the Independent Life Building. Built by The Auchter Company. It was designed by KBJ Architects, who received the Honor Award for Outstanding Achievement in Design by the Jacksonville Chapter of the American Institute of Architects for the design. The design concept included a sloping base and large corner frames to provide a distinctive image not only for the company, but also as an identifying landmark for the city of Jacksonville.

Beginning in 1995, Independent Life was acquired by the American General Life Insurance Company, and operations were gradually moved to Nashville, Tennessee. The building was sold to Associated Capital Properties, and the Jacksonville staffing company AccuStaff moved in and acquired the naming rights, and it became the AccuStaff Building. In 2002, AccuStaff changed its name to MPS Group. It renamed the building the Modis Building, after one of the company's main brands, and added Modis signage. In 2009, MPS Group was acquired by the Swiss firm Adecco Group, which announced the company would relocate to Jacksonville's suburbs. The move was completed in 2011 and the signage was removed, and the building was renamed Independent Square.

In May 2011, Wells Fargo, which had acquired the Wachovia financial services company, announced it would relocate local employees to the building. Signage went up on the Wells Fargo Center on September 26 and the relocation completed by April 2012.

In September 2017, Hurricane Irma's storm surge caused major flooding in Jacksonville's downtown area. These events impacted the parking garage of 1 Independent Square, which was briefly closed. The building reopened on September 29.

After downsizing their space in the building, Wells Fargo lost naming rights for the building and it subsequently was renamed to 1 Independent Square. The Wells Fargo signage was removed from the exterior of the building on July 14, 2024.

== Description and tenants ==
1 Independent Square has 37 floors and held the title of the tallest building in Florida until 1981, when One Tampa City Center was completed. The building takes up an entire city block in Jacksonville's downtown. It remained the tallest building in Jacksonville until 1990, when the Bank of America Tower surpassed it in height. A notable feature of the structure is a four-story atrium of tropical vegetation where the public enters. The first floor also contained an auditorium with seating for 360 patrons, a bank, restaurants, and several retail stores.

Parkway Properties is a third-party service provider for the building.

=== The River Club ===
River Club logo

One major tenant in 1 Independent Square is the River Club of Jacksonville, a private business club that occupies the top two floors of the building. Originally known as the Jacksonville Businessmen's Club, it was established in 1954 after the fashion of similar organizations in New York City, Chicago and Washington, D.C. It was formerly located on the 16th floor of the Prudential Building (now known as the Aetna Building), the city's tallest building when it opened in 1955. It relocated to its current space in 1976, but did not offer memberships to women until 1985. The club has been owned and managed by a subsidiary of Gate Petroleum since 2003.

== Gallery ==
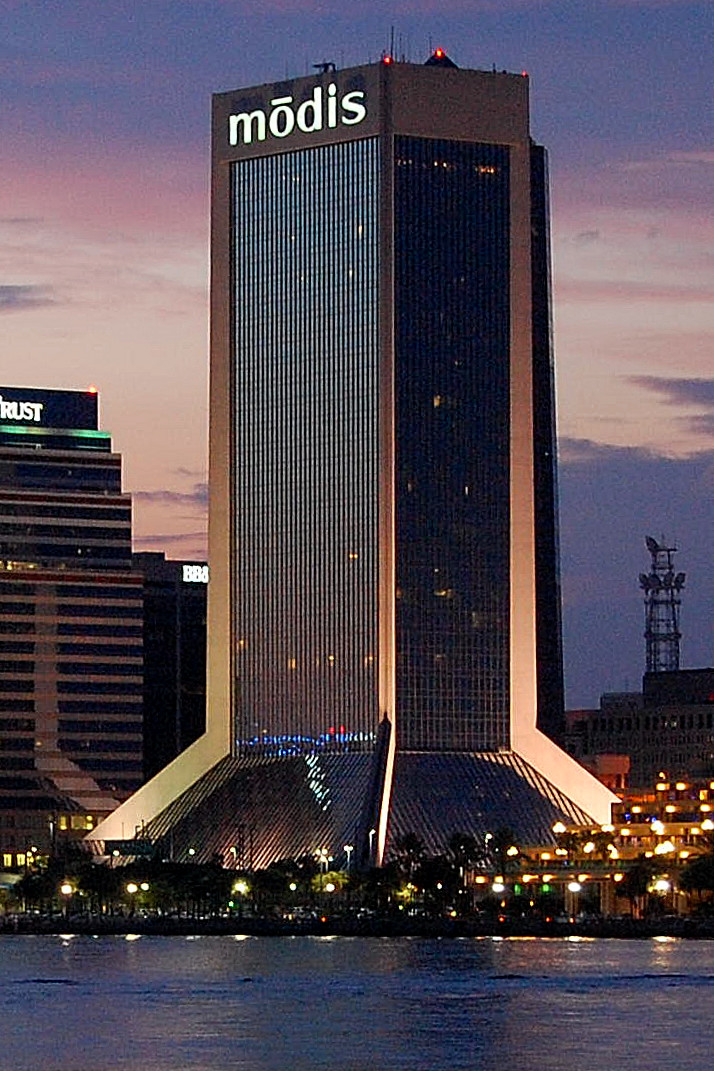
Modis signage, 2000

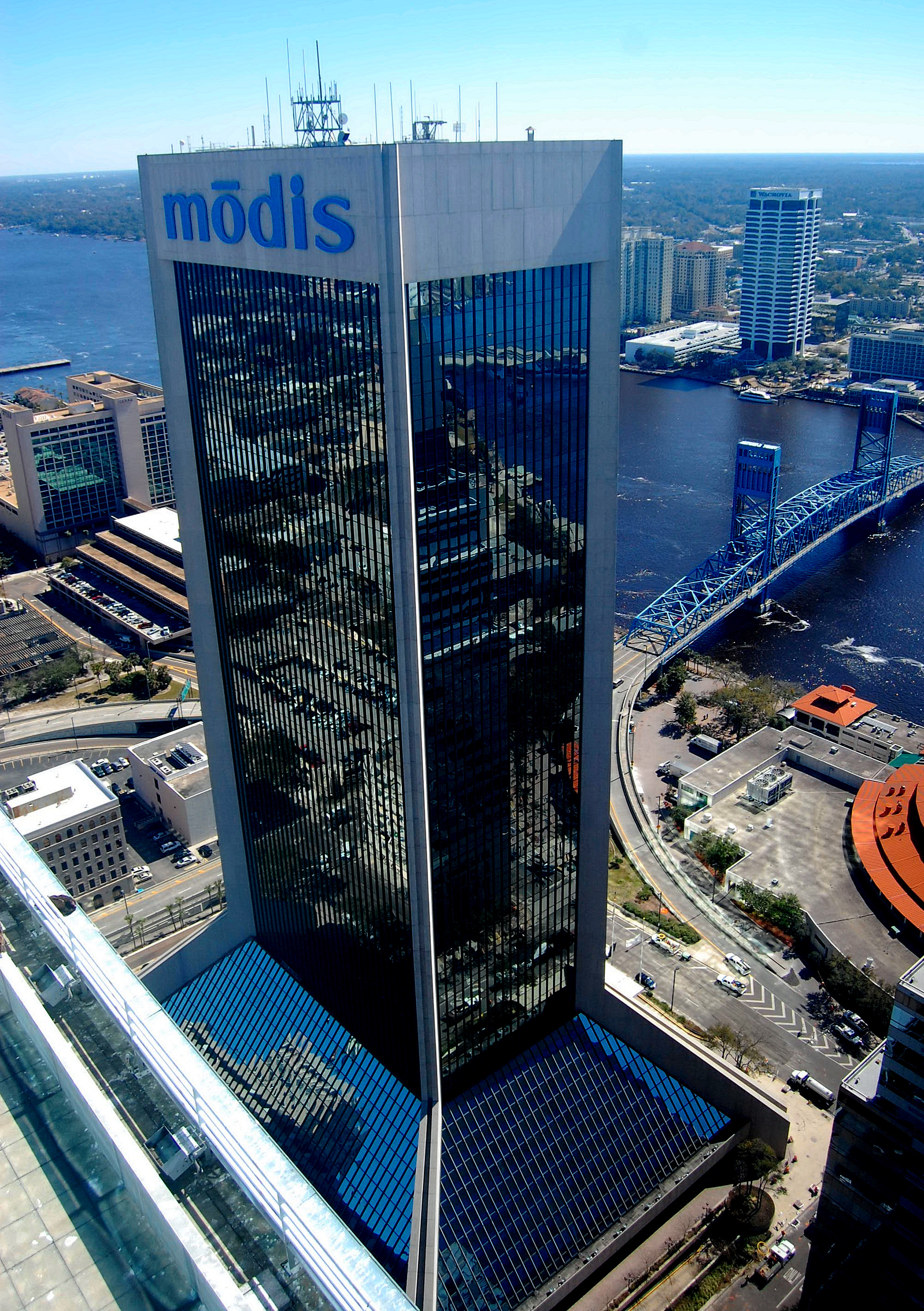
Aerial view, 2010

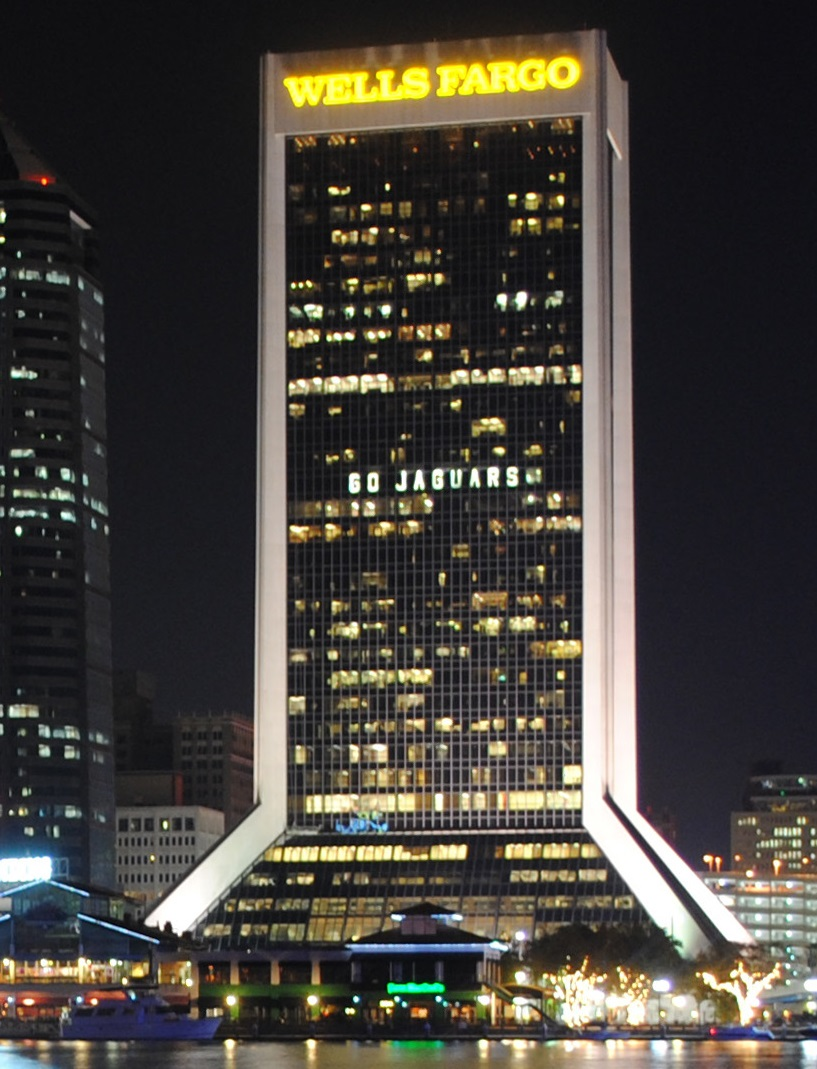
Go Jaguars lights, 2011

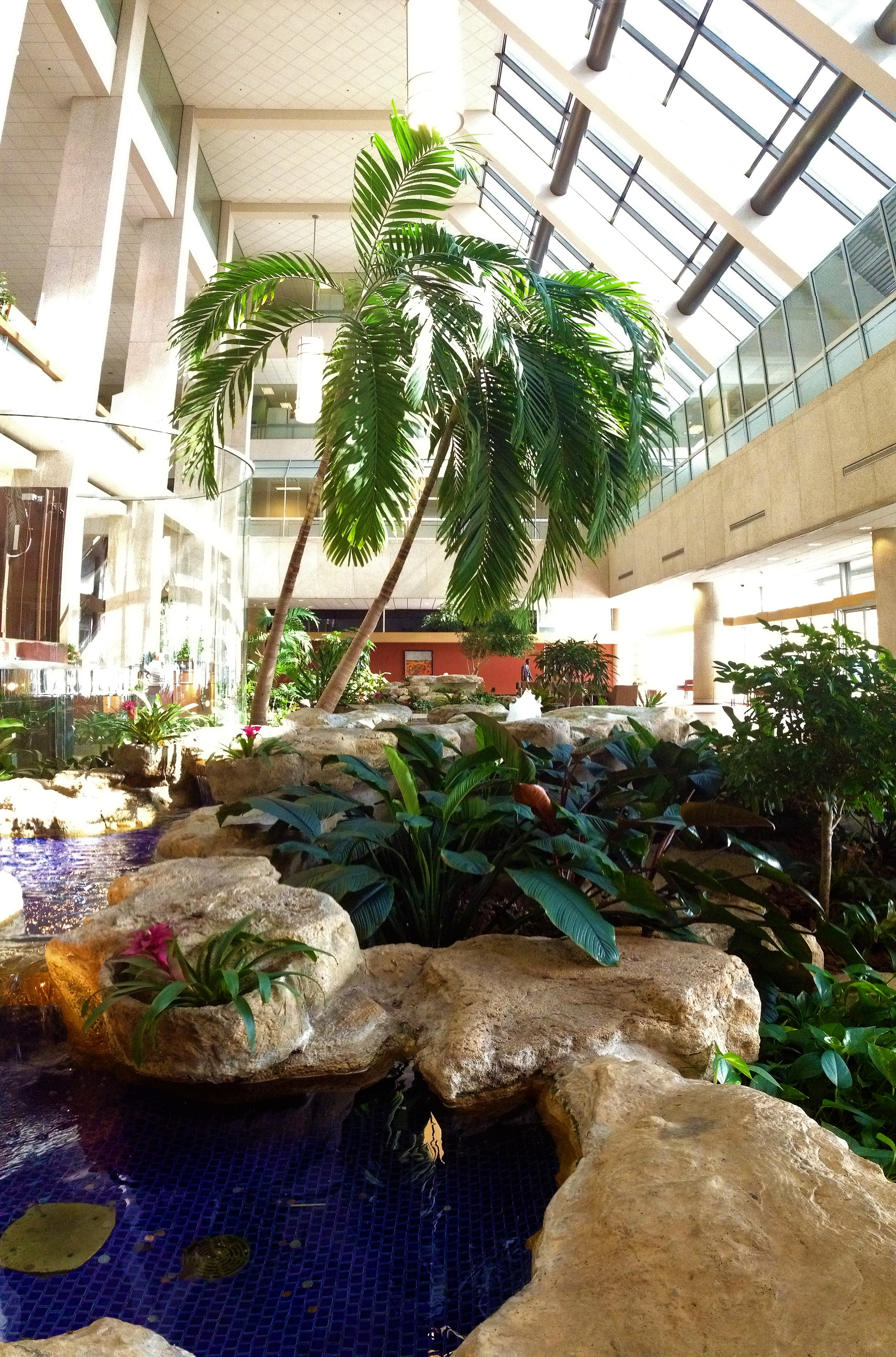
Interior

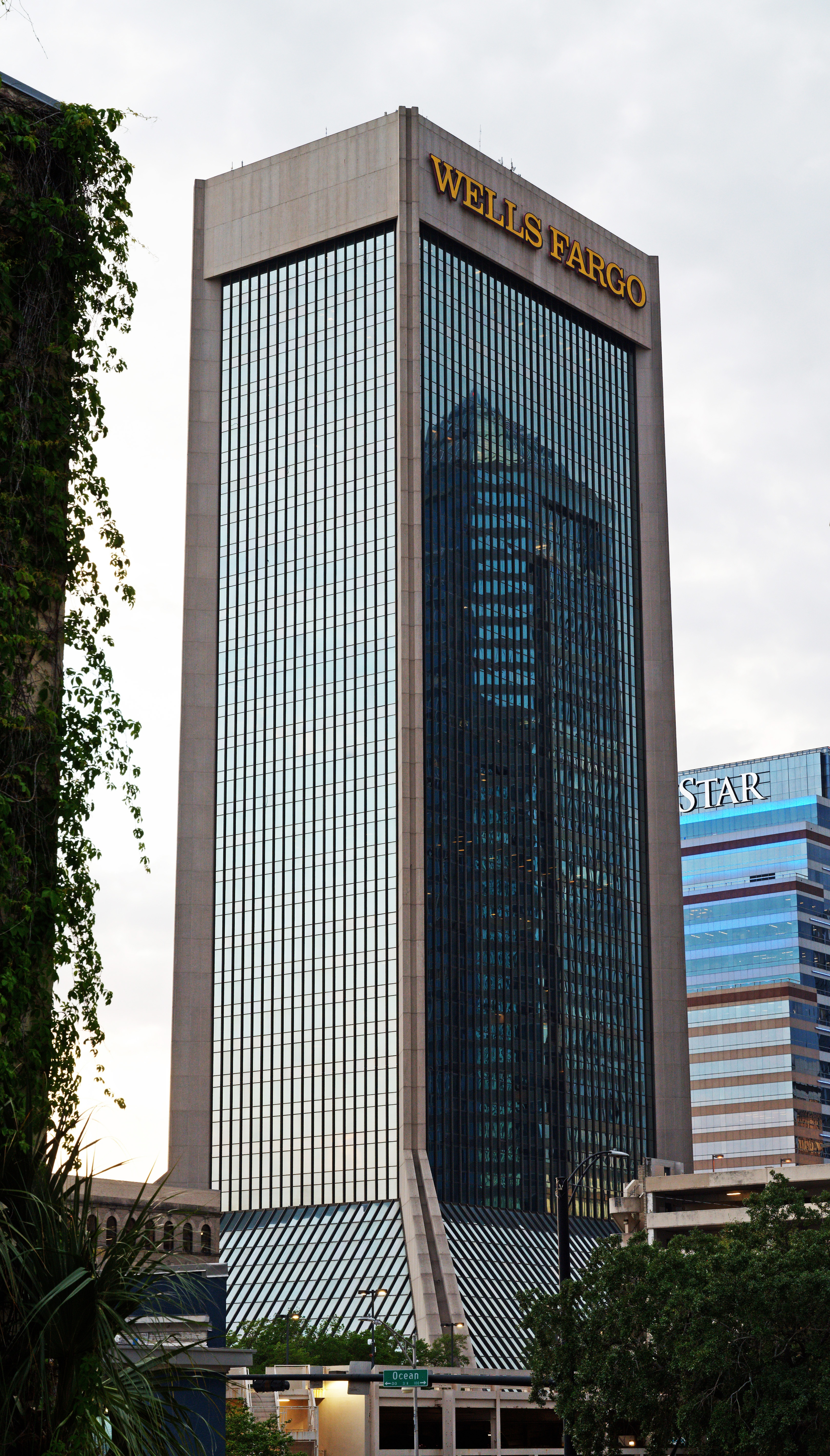
Side

== See also ==
- Architecture of Jacksonville
- List of tallest buildings in Jacksonville
- List of tallest buildings in Florida

Records
Preceded by Riverplace Tower	Tallest building in Jacksonville; 1974–1990; 163m	Succeeded by Bank of America Tower
Preceded by Vehicle Assembly Building	Tallest building in Florida; 1974–1981; 163m	Succeeded by One Tampa City Center
