= Riverplace Tower =

Office building in Jacksonville, FL

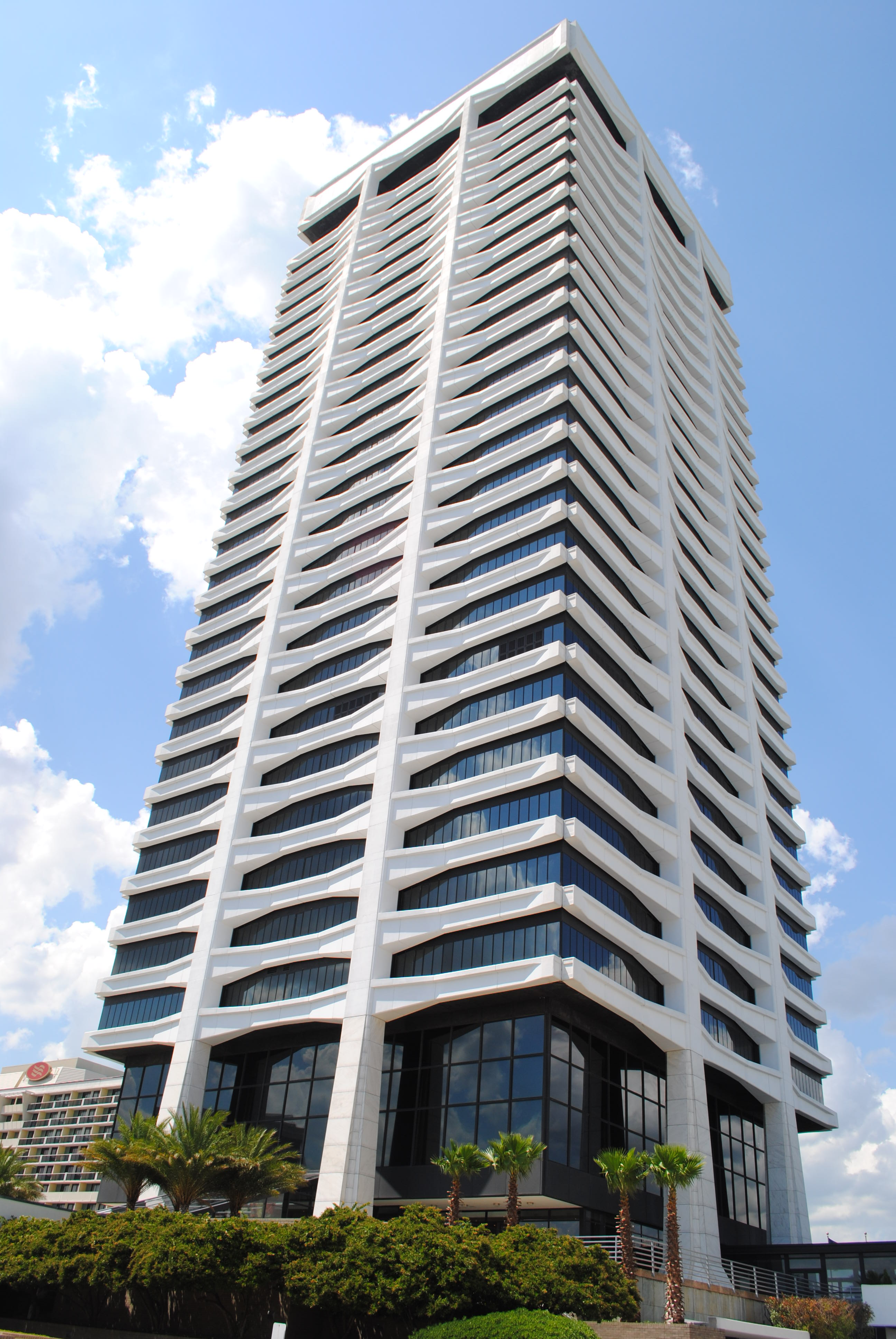

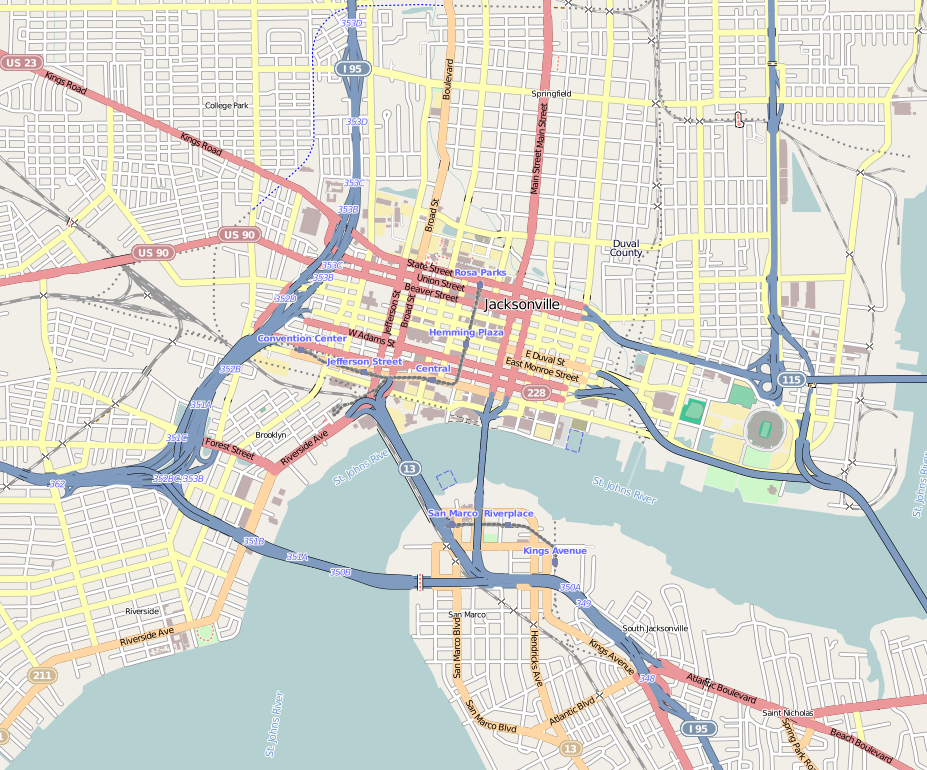
- Location within Central Jacksonville Location within Florida
- Former names: Gulf Life Tower

General information
- Type: Commercial offices
- Architectural style: Mid-century modern / Structural expressionism
- Location: 1301 Riverplace Boulevard Jacksonville, Florida, United States
- Coordinates: 30.319403°N 81.656541°W
- Construction started: 1966
- Completed: 1967
- Opening: 1967; 59 years ago
- Owner: 1301 Riverplace Owner, LLC; Greenwich, CT

Height
- Roof: 432 ft (132 m)

Technical details
- Floor count: 28
- Floor area: 542,000 sq ft (50,350 m^{2})<
- Lifts/elevators: 8

Design and construction
- Architect: Welton Becket
- Architecture firm: KBJ Architects
- Developer: Capital Partners

The Riverplace Tower is a 28-floor office building on the south bank of the St. Johns River in Jacksonville, Florida. At the time of its construction, it was the tallest building in the state of Florida and was the defining landmark in Jacksonville's skyline. On April 18, 2012, the American Institute of Architects's Florida Chapter placed the building on its list of Florida Architecture: 100 Years. 100 Places as the Riverplace Tower / Formerly Gulf Life Tower.

== History ==
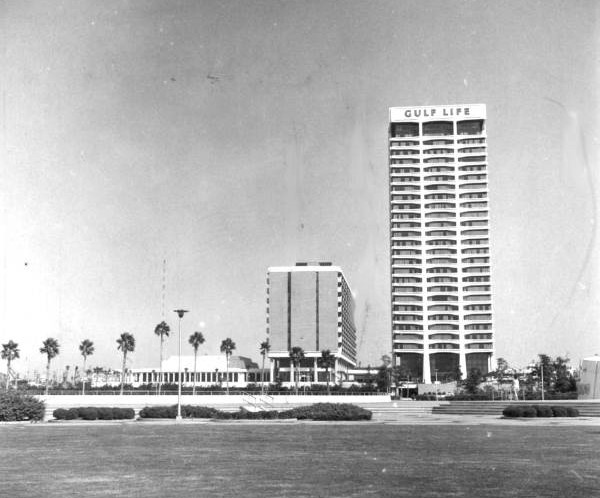
Gulf Life Tower in 1968.

The Auchter Company, Jacksonville's oldest general construction contractor, built the 542,000 ft^{2} Gulf Life Tower for the Gulf Life Insurance Company in 1966. It was designed by the notable architect, Welton Becket and KBJ Architects. When completed in 1967, it was the tallest precast, post-tensioned concrete structure in the world.

It remained Florida's tallest for five years until Miami's One Biscayne Tower was constructed in 1972. It was Jacksonville's tallest for eight years until the Independent Life Building (now the Wells Fargo Center) was built in 1974. As of 2023, Riverplace Tower is the fifth tallest building in Jacksonville.

Gulf Life Insurance Company was merged into American General Life of Houston in 1991 and the Jacksonville Gulf Life Tower was unneeded and destined to be sold. American General wanted $30 million, but the building was 24 years old and no longer a class "A" property. Several prospective buyers looked at the building, but the property stayed on the market for more than two years. For tax reasons, American General was desperate to sell during 1993 and accepted a cash offer of $9.0 million from Gate Petroleum. Shortly thereafter, Gate began a multimillion-dollar renovation of the entire building and renamed it Riverplace Tower.

Building occupancy was 40% when the sale closed; within two years from the completion of the renovation, it had soared to nearly 95% and the building was restored to its former prominence.

The banner sign at the top of the building originally displayed "Gulf Life" in 1967. After Gulf Life was acquired by American General in 1991, it was changed to "SouthTrust", and the structure was known as the SouthTrust Building. When SouthTrust and Wachovia merged in 2005, "Wachovia" signage was installed, but it was removed January 22, 2011.

Since 1968 until its closure in 2016, the University Club of Jacksonville occupied the building's top floor. There were approximately 1,300 members: business executives of both genders; older, long-term associates; and young professionals. The private club was available to members and their guests, or ClubCorp affiliates. The facility was a hub for networking and entertaining clients, as well as providing conference rooms and offices for conducting business in private. The club also offered two full service athletic facilities; one co-ed and one for men only.

Gate Petroleum sold the building on October 31, 2014 to CFLC Replace LLC in Glen Allen, Virginia for $29.0 million.

The building was sold on December 1, 2016 to LCP Riverplace LLC in Glen Allen, Virginia for $53.4 million.

The building was sold on December 22, 2021 to 1301 Riverplace Owner, LLC in Greenwich, Connecticut for $73.2 million.

== Design ==
The structural system consists of precast concrete floor plates and a poured concrete core. The building is an example of a suspended structure. The building gets structural support from the central core and the external vertical beams, which leaves a more open internal space. There are two tapered columns on each side of the building. Cross beams connect the vertical columns to create a skeleton which allows the cantilevered floors.

The concrete grid on the outside of the building is the only support needed to hold up the structure, leaving the interior completely available for use. Each of the exposed beams consist of fourteen precast units held together with high strength post-tensioned steel cables. The beams cantilever 42 feet from the columns as they taper upward and inward. The color of the concrete façade comes from White quartz sand and white cement bonded to the surface.

The Gate River Run Hall of Fame was established in 2002 and is permanently located on the concourse level. Memorabilia from the event, which began in 1978, is on display, and a five-minute video gives visitors an overview of the race. Plaques for each of the 12 persons inducted into the HOF are on display.

Savour is a public restaurant located on the second floor of the tower, and it offers an excellent view of the river and northbank through its glass, north-facing wall.

== Honors ==
In honor of its 50th anniversary, the Precast/Prestressed Concrete Institute went through the arduous process of selecting the Seven precast concrete "Wonders". Their choices were: the Department of Housing and Urban Development Headquarters in Washington, D.C.; Gulf Life Tower in Jacksonville; Disney World Monorail in Orlando, TransAmerica Pyramid in San Francisco; Aurora Justice Facility and Municipal Center in Aurora, Colorado; Sunshine Skyway Bridge in Tampa Bay, Florida; and the Blue Cross-Blue Shield Parking Structure in North Haven, Connecticut.

According to an Architecture article in Time Magazine, "(the) Gulf Life, placed in a shoddy, chaotic part of Jacksonville, is a tonic for its area, acts as an organizing beacon. And the bold Alcoa building…makes a positive contribution to San Francisco. Both buildings thus achieve excellence."

== Gallery ==
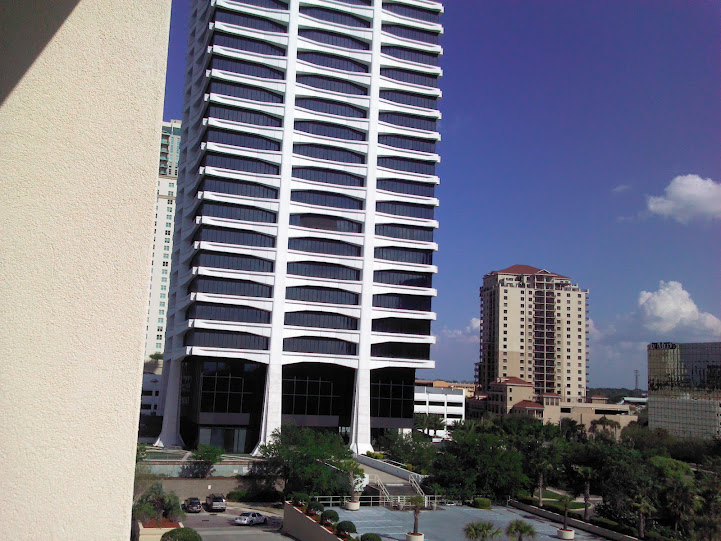

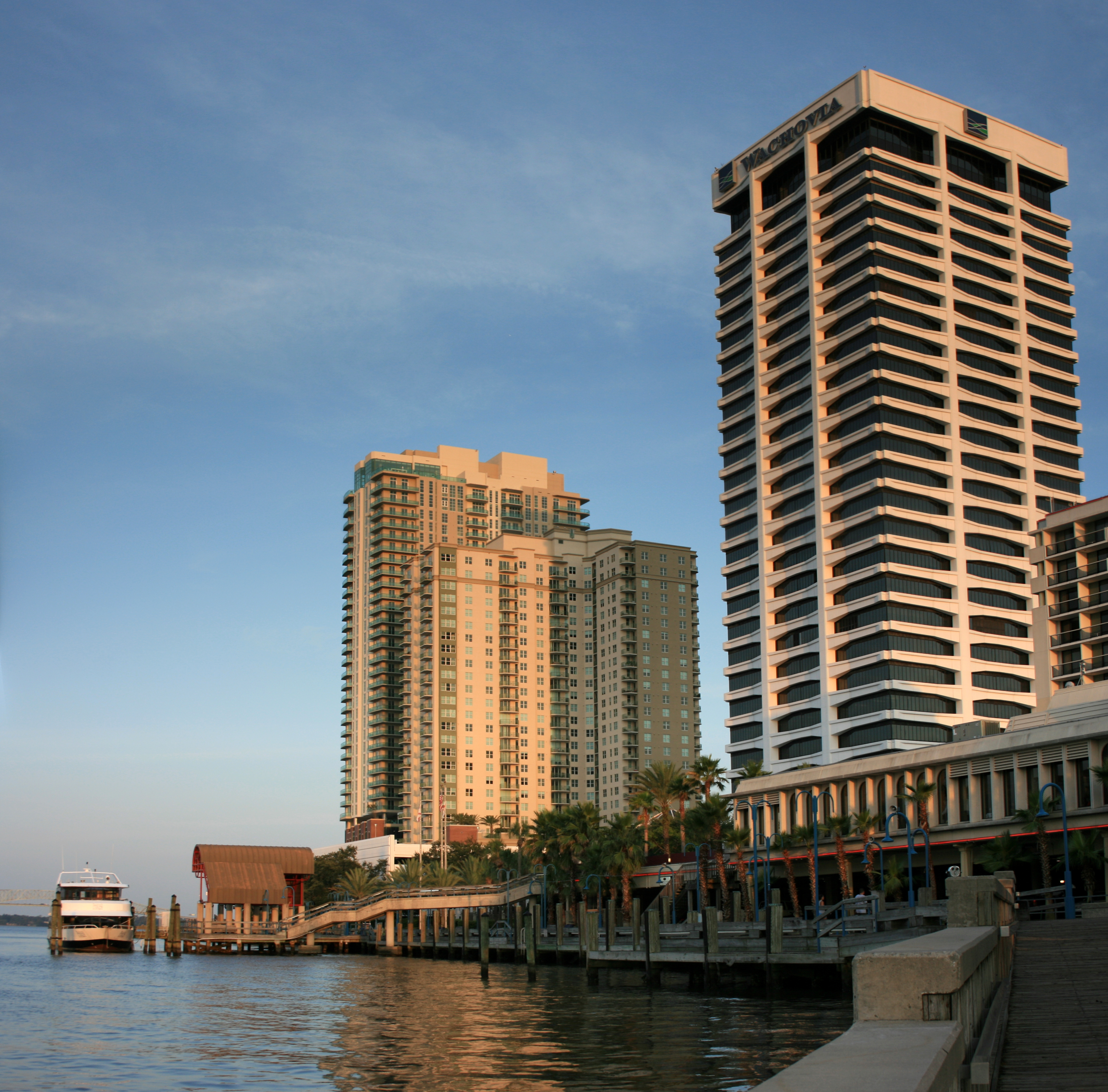

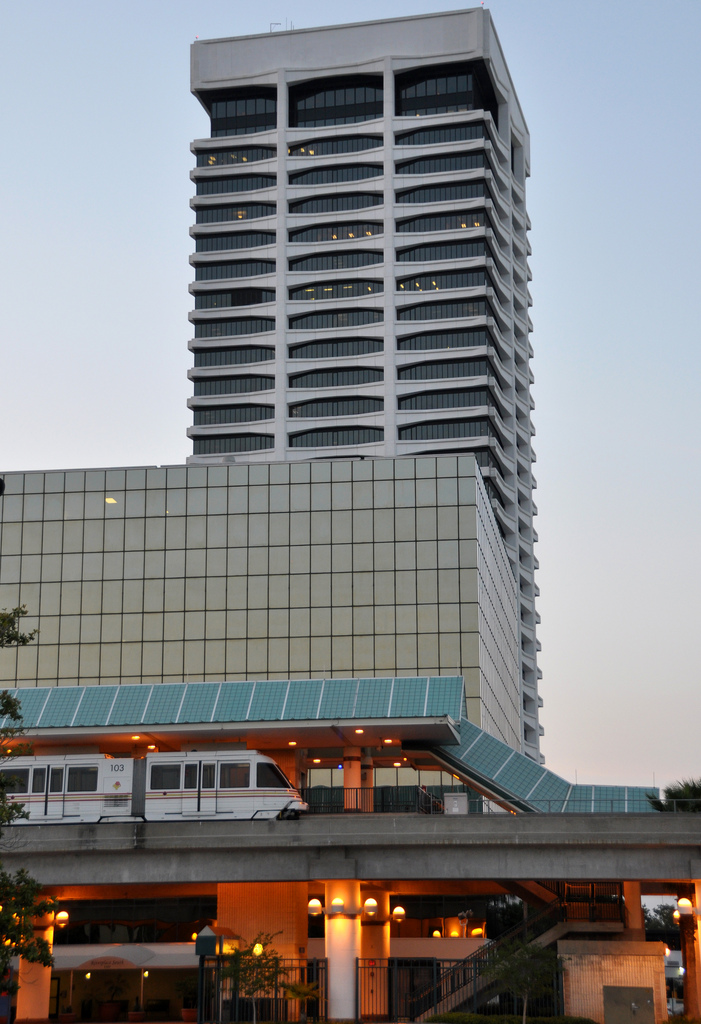

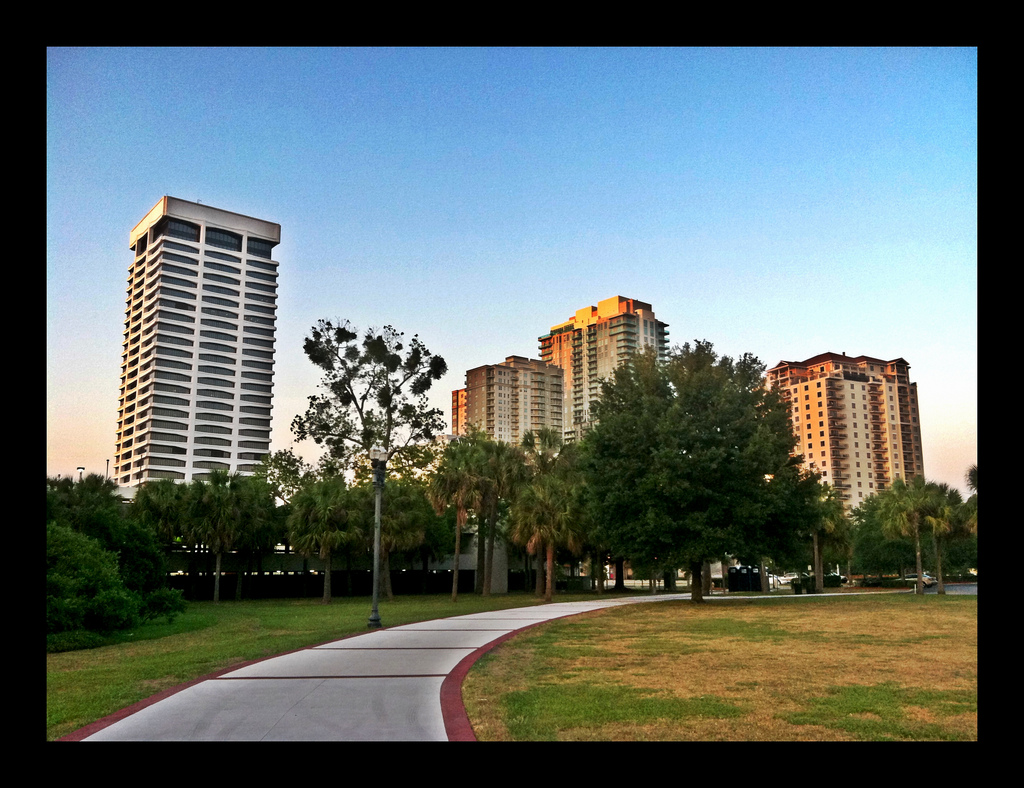

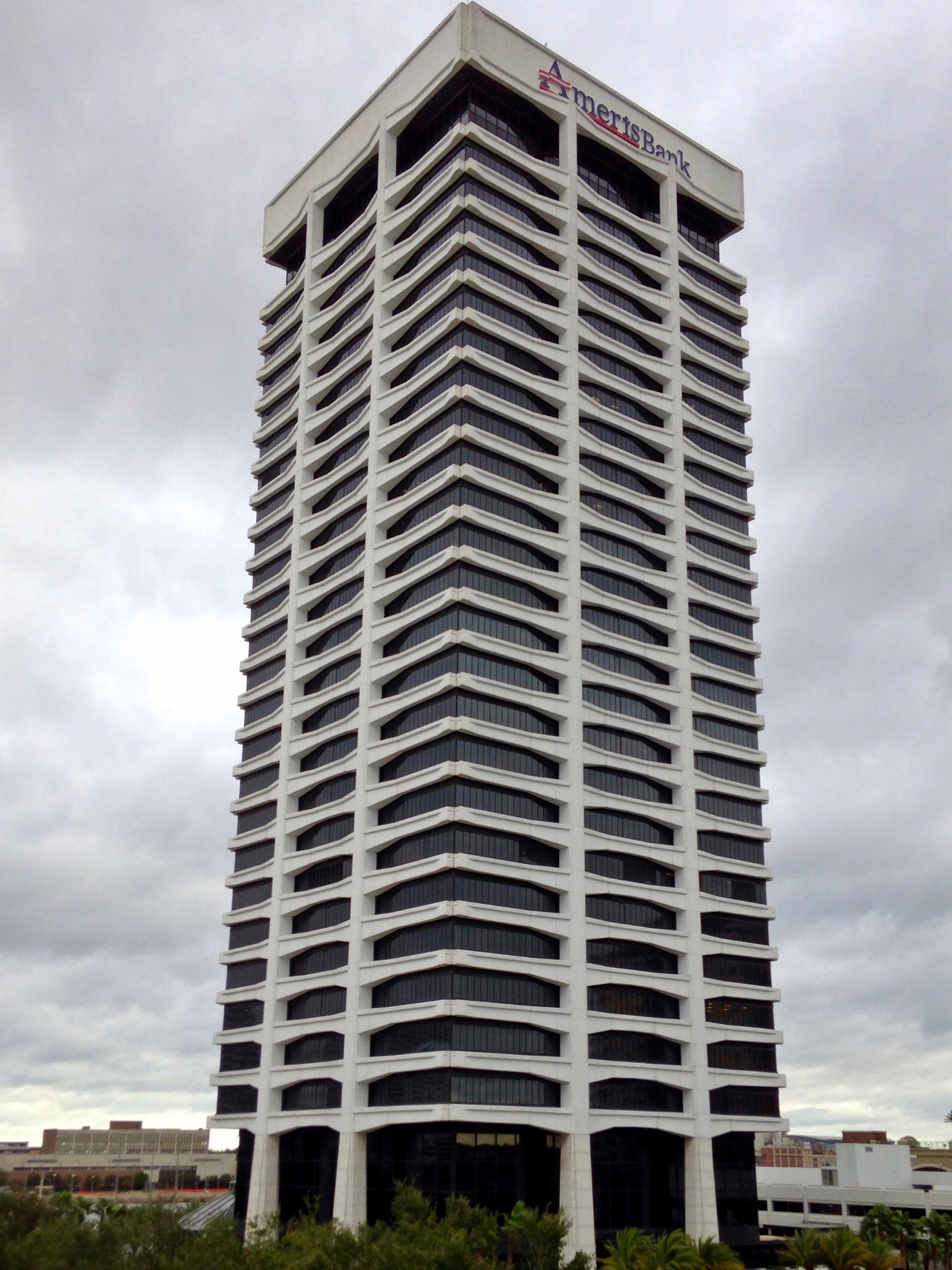

== See also ==
- Architecture of Jacksonville
- List of tallest buildings in Jacksonville
- Downtown Jacksonville

Records
| Preceded by Aetna Building | Tallest Building in Jacksonville; 1967—1974; 132m | Succeeded by Wells Fargo Center |
