= KBJ Architects =

Architectural firm

KBJ Architects, Inc.
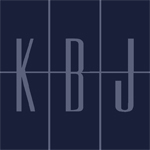
- Formerly: Kemp, Bunch and Jackson Architects
- Company type: Private
- Industry: Architecture
- Founded: 1946 in Jacksonville, Florida
- Founders: William D. Kemp; Franklin S. Bunch; William K. Jackson
- Headquarters: Thomas V. Porter House; 510 Julia Street; Jacksonville, Florida
- Services: Architecture, interior design
- Revenue: $157.9 million (2005)
- Number of employees: 50 (2005)
- Website: www.kbj.com

KBJ Architects, Inc. (KBJ) is an American architectural firm founded by Franklin S. Bunch, William K. Jackson, and William D. Kemp in 1946 from Jacksonville, Florida.

== History ==
Roy A. Benjamin (1888–1963) moved from Ocala to Jacksonville soon after the Great Fire of 1901 and designed many notable buildings in Jacksonville and surrounding areas. His most famous structures were theaters, although a number of them have since been demolished. He was one of Jacksonville's most talented and prolific architects. Three University of Florida alumni—William D. Kemp, Franklin S. Bunch, and William K. Jackson—purchased Benjamin's architectural firm when he retired after World War II and renamed it Kemp, Bunch and Jackson Architects in 1946.

=== Founders ===
Each founder focused on one aspect of the firm: Kemp specialized in the business side of projects, Bunch was known for being the expert in architecture's construction and technical aspects, and Jackson was the lead designer.

- Franklin S. Bunch (1913–2008) served as president on a number of Florida boards and foundations, including the Florida State Board of Architecture, the Florida Association of Architects, and the Jacksonville Building Code Advisory Committee. He was also chairman of the Zoning and Building Codes Adjustment Board. and was named an AIA Fellow in 1961.http://www.dcp.ufl.edu/files/004b4536-1461-4a09-9.pdf
- William K. Jackson (1914–2003) strongly believed in long-range urban planning and was a key supporter of 1962 legislation that created the Jacksonville-Duval Area Planning Board. He was chairman of the board that created Jacksonville's first downtown development plan.
- William D. Kemp (1912–1982) was less outgoing than his other partners. According to his son, Kemp believed that architecture should remain pure, and not be directly involved with other construction industry activities. As such, he limited his outside activities to his church, where he was very active, serving as a Senior Warden and Vestryman.

== Projects ==
KBJ has worked throughout north and central Florida, as well as throughout the southeast United States. Clients include international and private corporations, developers, institutions, public authorities, and federal, state, and local governments. The firm also developed the design standards for residential developments at the Deerwood Country Club and at Amelia Island Plantation north of Jacksonville. In Orlando, KBJ designed the First National Bank and Hartford Insurance buildings and three of the four airsides at Orlando International Airport; in Gainesville, the Delta Tau Delta fraternity house and Tigert Hall, the University of Florida Administration building; the Quarterdeck Club in Miami and the Occidental Life building in Raleigh.

=== Notable projects in Jacksonville ===
The firm designed 17 of the city's 30 tallest buildings and "created Jacksonville's modern skyline", according to The Florida Times-Union. The firm designed the first high-rise in downtown Jacksonville, the 22-story Aetna Building, which opened in 1955.

Project	Location	Completed	Image	Notes
Aetna Building	Southbank	1955		Formerly Prudential Insurance Building
233 West Duval Street	Northbank	1955		Formerly Independent Life Building
CSX Transportation Building	Northbank	1960		Formerly Atlantic Coast Line Railroad Building
Times-Union Center for the Performing Arts	Northbank	1962		Formerly Jacksonville Civic Auditorium
Riverplace Tower	Southbank	1967		Formerly Gulf Life Tower
Times-Union Building	Northbank	1967		
Cathedral Towers	Northbank	1968		
Cathedral Townhouse	Northbank	1970		
Cathedral Terrace	Northbank	1974		
BB&T Bank Building	Northbank	1974		Formerly First Union National Bank Building
Wells Fargo Center	Northbank	1974		Formerly Independent Square
550 Water Street	Northbank	1982		
EverBank Center	Northbank	1983		Formerly Southern Bell Tower
Two Prudential Plaza	Southbank	1985		
SunTrust Tower	Northbank	1989		Formerly American Heritage Life Building
Bryan Simpson United States Courthouse	Northbank	2002		in association with HLM Design
Duval County Courthouse	Northbank	2012		

==== Duval County Courthouse ====
In June 2002, KBJ Architects, Rink Reynolds, Cannon Design, and Spillis Candela were the final four candidates under consideration for designing the planned Duval County Courthouse Complex. When Cannon Design was chosen, KBJ appealed the award, claiming that Cannon's design was inconsistent with the specifications for size and budget set by the city, but the administration of Mayor John Delaney saw no grounds for the award to be rescinded. The project continued under Cannon into the term of Mayor John Peyton, but costs and the size of the project fluctuated and ultimately peaked at a $224 million construction cost, $23 million over the $201 million Mendoza Line for construction costs drawn by the Mayor. As a result, Peyton stopped all work on the project and terminated all consultants contracts for convenience, including Jacobs Facilities (Program Manager), Cannon (Architect), and construction managers Skanska Dynamic Partners.

The project was re-bid in 2006, and the city received two offers for a Design-Build solution and project delivery. The team of Perry-McCall Construction -The Auchter Company coupled with Architects Rink Design and DLR were initially awarded the contract. When it was discovered that the Auchter Company had financial troubles, the contract was terminated for convenience. Second place bidder, Turner Construction Company, which is partnered with Technical Construction Services Group and KBJ Architects, was given an opportunity to negotiate a contract with the city in July 2007, by approval of the Competitive Sealed Proposal Evaluation Committee. A contract was signed with a budget of $350 million. Work was completed and the courthouse opened on June 18, 2012.

=== Other significant buildings ===
KBJ designed buildings include:

- Disney's Art of Animation Resort
- Disney's Beach Club Villas
- Disney’s Wedding Pavilion
- Douglas Anderson School of the Arts
- Fidelity National Financial buildings
- Florida State College at Jacksonville Kent Campus
- Jacksonville University administration building
- Occidental Life Insurance Company Building in Raleigh, North Carolina
- Omni Jacksonville Hotel
- Physician Sales & Service offices
- SuperStock offices
- Riverside Presbyterian House
- Tournament Players Club clubhouse (demolished)

== See also ==
- Architecture of Jacksonville
