= Eight Forty One =

Building in Jacksonville, Florida

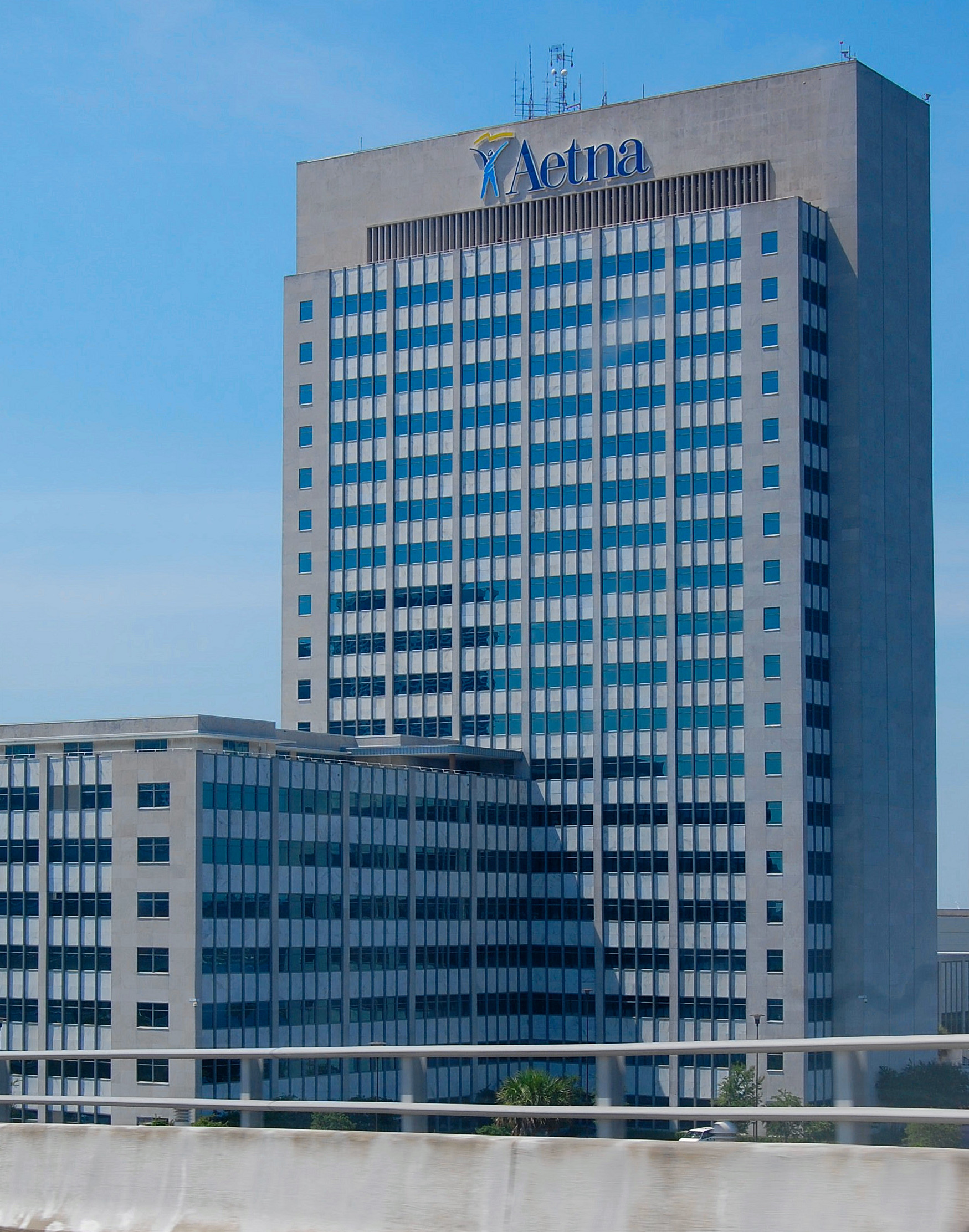

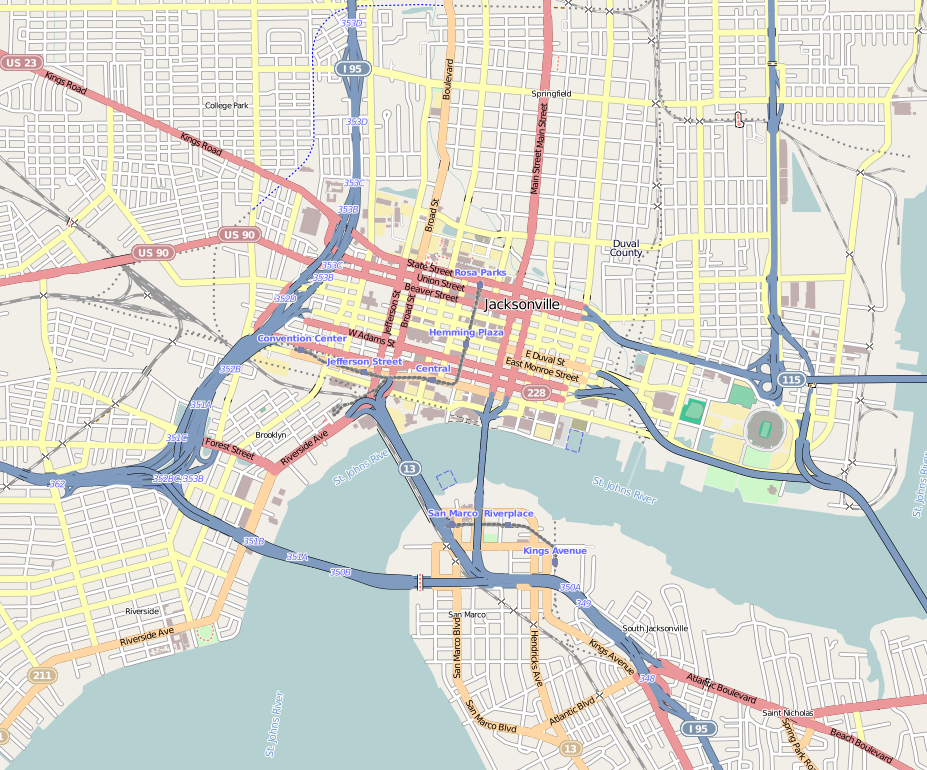
- Location within Central Jacksonville Location within Florida
- Former names: Aetna Building; One Prudential Plaza, Prudential Life Insurance Building

General information
- Type: Commercial offices
- Architectural style: International Style; Moderne
- Location: 841 Prudential Drive Jacksonville, Florida, U.S.
- Coordinates: 30.316376°N 81.663712°W
- Construction started: 1953
- Completed: 1955
- Opening: 1955
- Owner: South Shore Group

Height
- Roof: 309 ft (94 m)

Technical details
- Floor count: 22

Design and construction
- Architecture firm: KBJ Architects

Eight Forty One is a 309 feet (94 metres), 22-floor office building on the south bank of the St. Johns River in Jacksonville, Florida. Completed in 1955, it was the tallest building in the city for 13 years until surpassed by the Riverplace Tower. It was "The Tallest Office Building in the South" and the tallest in Florida until NASA's Vehicle Assembly Building was completed in 1965. The building's former names include the Aetna Building, Prudential Plaza I or One Prudential Plaza, and the Prudential Building.

== History ==
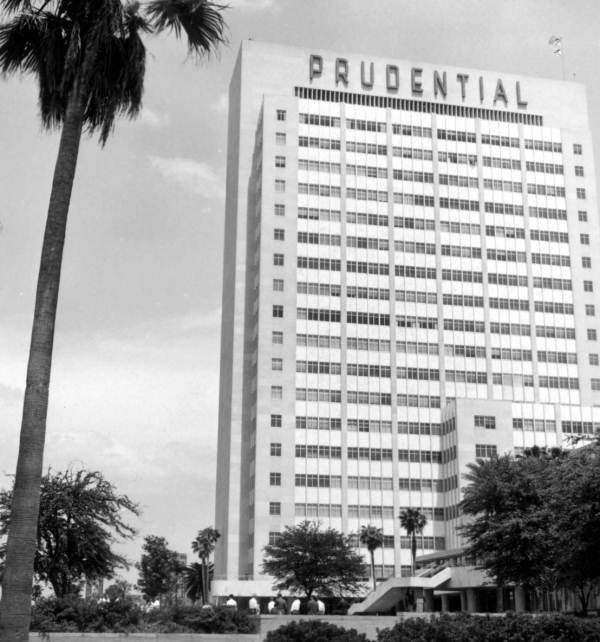
Prudential Building in 1960.

Originally known as the Prudential Building, it was constructed in 1955 for Prudential Insurance, which had selected Jacksonville as its Southeastern headquarters. Construction materials included Alabama limestone, North Carolina pink granite and Georgia marble. The 13-acre (53,000 m^{2}) property is situated on the south/east bank of the St. Johns River and includes 1,100 feet (340 m) of riverfrontage. A 2-ton piece of the Rock of Gibraltar, once in the lobby, is now found in the courtyard on the riverfront. The building was used as background in scenes from the film Creature From the Black Lagoon.

A sister building, Two Prudential Plaza, was constructed next door in 1985. The Prudential Building underwent a major renovation in 1988.

Ocwen Financial Corp. completed the $36 million purchase of the Prudential Plaza One building in August, 1998.

In 1999, Aetna acquired the Prudential HealthCare business for $1 billion, and the signage was changed to "Aetna". The building is officially known as Prudential Plaza I. Another major renovation was completed in 2002 after 153,000 sq ft (14,200 m^{2}) was vacated by Aetna. The makeover also included construction of a 1,100-space parking garage by Elkins Constructors. On February 21, 2002 the Prudential Plaza I building was renamed 841 Prudential Drive.

On January 23, 2004, Ocwen sold 841 Prudential Drive to South Shore Group for $39 million. The building's name reverted to Aetna Building.

At the January 31, 2008 meeting of the Downtown Development Review Board (DDRB) of the Jacksonville Economic Development Commission (JEDC), plans were tentatively approved for a 128-slip dockage facility to be named The South Shore Marina & Riverwalk at the Aetna Building. The project will use a design similar to that used by South Beach marinas. Landscape and lighting improvements will be made to the existing Jacksonville Riverwalk. Permits from the Florida Department of Environmental Protection and the United States Army Corps of Engineers had already been obtained.

== Tenants ==
The building was the original home of what is now the River Club of Jacksonville, a private business club that relocated to building now known as the Wells Fargo Center in 1976.

The 12th floor is occupied by the Regus Aetna Center, which provides executive office suites to businesses needing temporary office space.

== Gallery ==
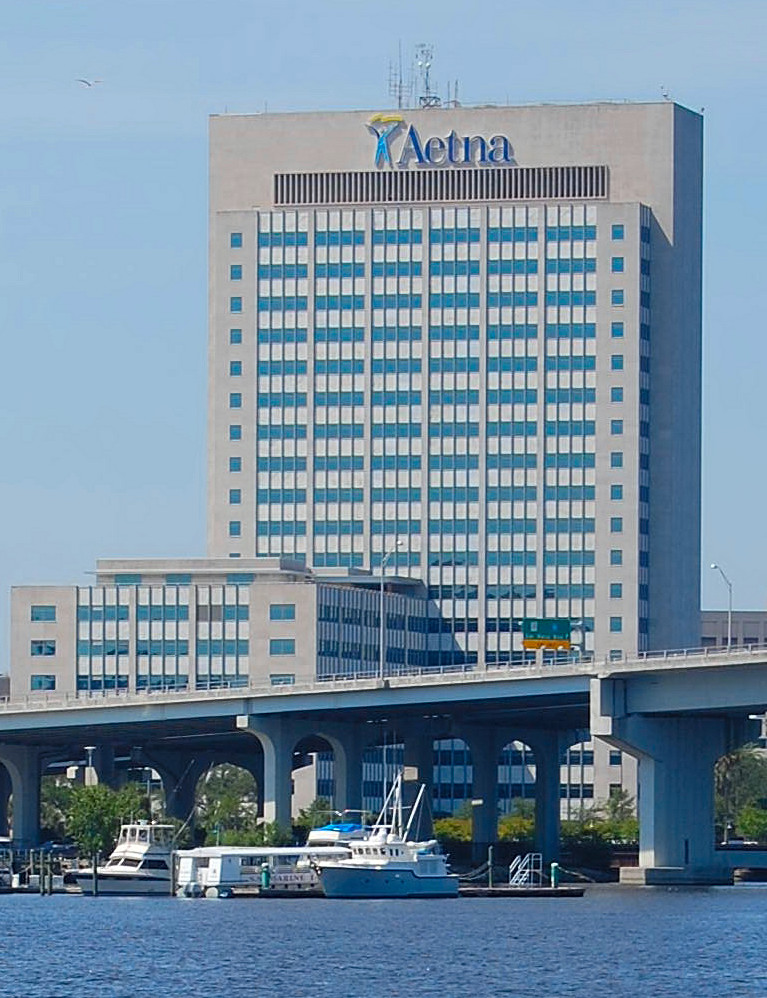

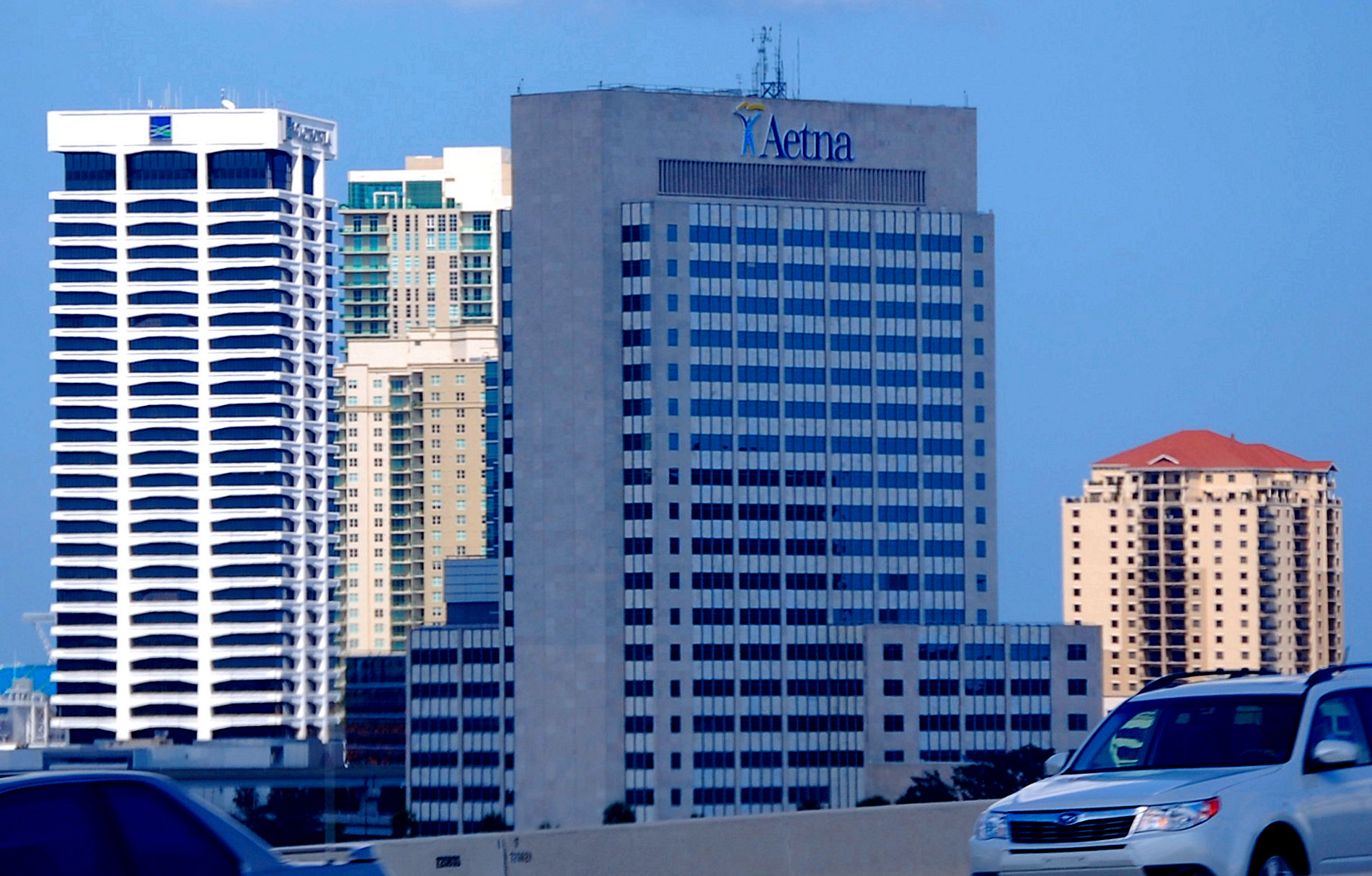

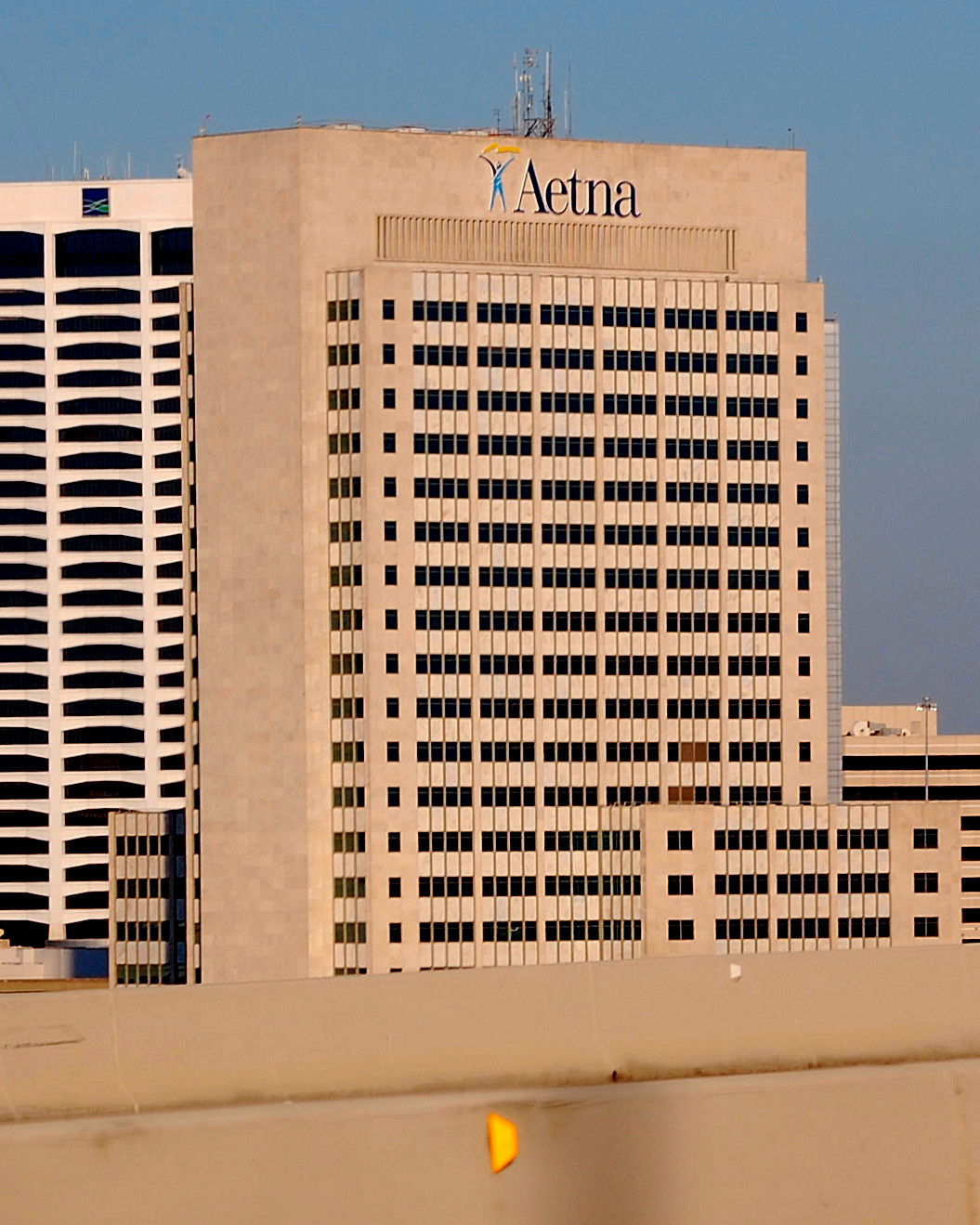

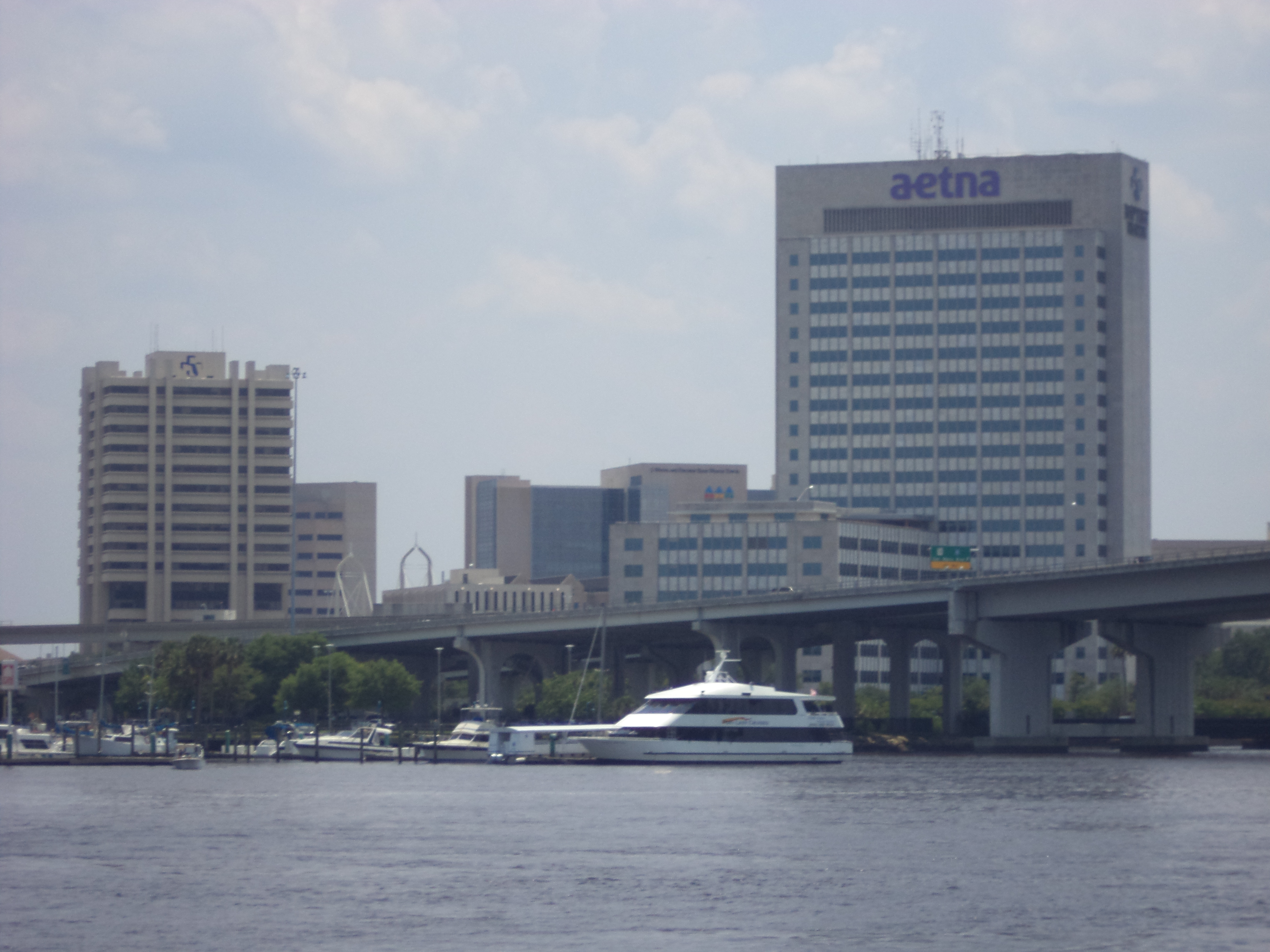

Records
Preceded by Barnett National Bank Building	Tallest Building in Jacksonville; 1954—1967; 94m	Succeeded by Riverplace Tower

== See also ==
- Architecture of Jacksonville
- List of tallest buildings in Jacksonville
- List of tallest buildings in Florida
- Downtown Jacksonville
