= USS Adept =

AFDL-1-class dry dock of the United States Navy

Coordinates: 27.9019°N 97.1394°W

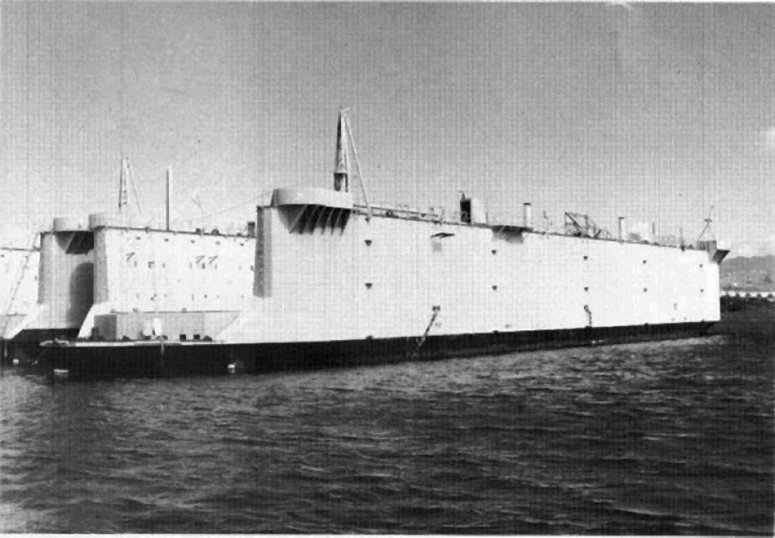
- USS Adept (AFD-23)

History

United States
- Name: Adept
- Namesake: Adept
- Builder: George D. Auchter Co.
- Laid down: 1943
- Completed: December 1944
- Recommissioned: December 1965
- Reclassified: AFDL-23, 1946
- Identification: Callsign: NPCM; Hull number: AFD-23
- Honors and awards: See Awards
- Fate: Leased to Gulf Copper & Manufacturing Corp.
- Status: Operational in Port Arthur, Texas

General characteristics
- Class & type: AFDL-1-class floating drydock
- Displacement: 12,000 t (11,810 long tons)
- Length: 288 ft (87.8 m)
- Beam: 64 ft (19.5 m)
- Draft: 45 ft (13.7 m)
- Capacity: 1,900 t (1,870 long tons)

USS Adept (AFD-23) was a AFDL-1-class small auxiliary dry dock of the United States Navy Auxiliary floating drydock built for World War II.

== Construction and career ==
The construction of one-section, steel, floating Drydock built at Jacksonville, Florida by George D. Auchter Co. and had begun late in 1943 and completed in December 1944. The small, non-self-propelled auxiliary floating drydock was then towed to the Chesapeake Bay for duty at the United States Coast Guard base at Curtis Bay, Baltimore., where she began docking small naval combatant ships—up to the size of destroyer escorts—for hull repairs.

Redesignated AFDL-23 on 1 August 1946, she was moved to Hawaii in the 18 months immediately following the end of the war. By 1 January 1947, AFDL-23 was laid up with the Pacific Reserve Fleet at Pearl Harbor.

After almost two decades of inactivity, AFDL-23 was placed in service in December 1965 to support the Navy's efforts in South Vietnam during the Vietnam War. She served at the Pacific Fleet's advanced bases. While continuing such duty, AFDL-23 was named Adept on 7 June 1979.

On 24 February 1992, USS Brunswick (ATS-3) towed Adept out of Subic Bay for Guam. In the fall of 2004, USS Osprey (MHC-51) made another visit to Adept at Gulf Copper Ship Repair, Aransas Pass, from 1 until 5 October. In 2019, she began her upgrade in Dock 4.

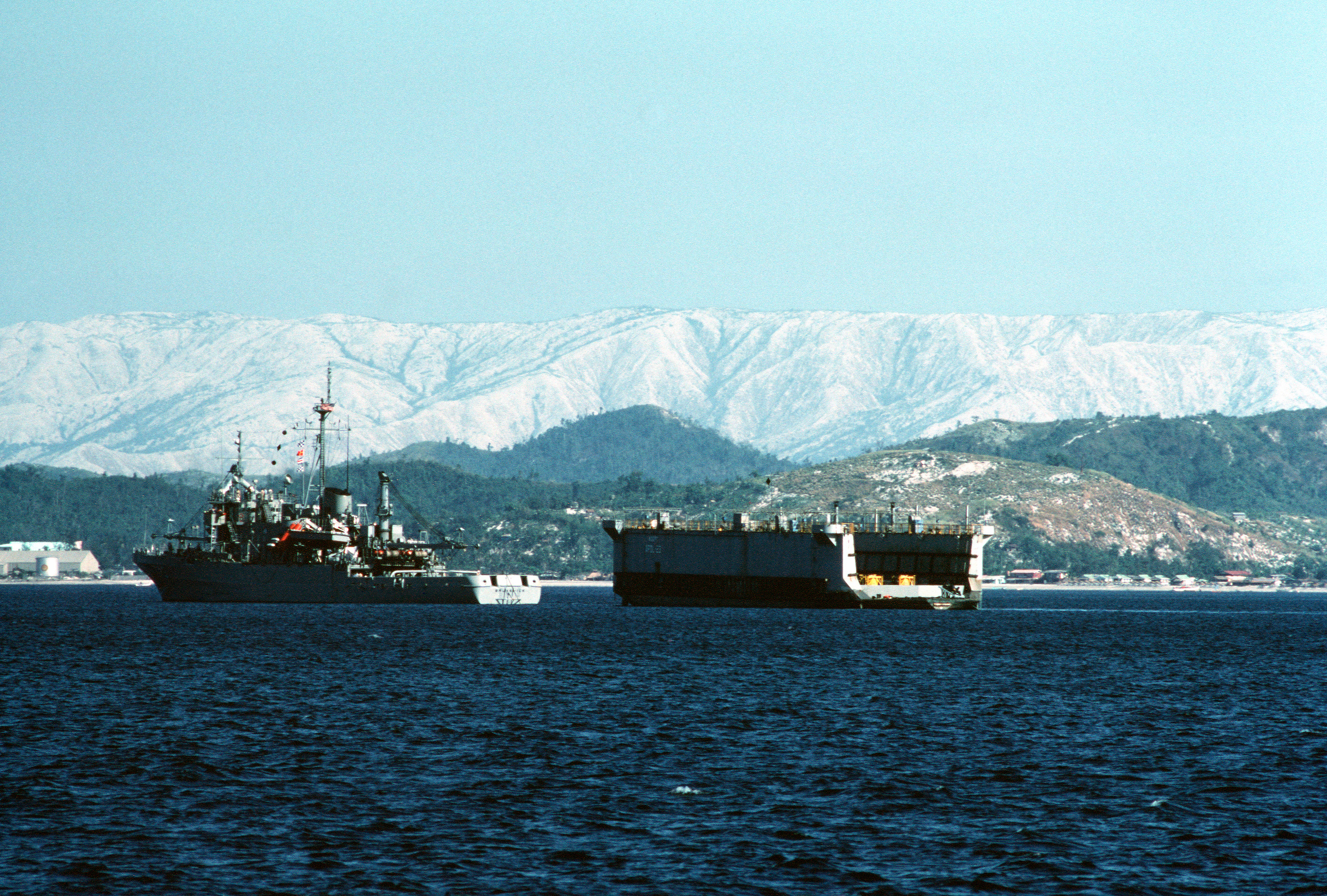
USS Brunswick towing Adept on 24 February 1992

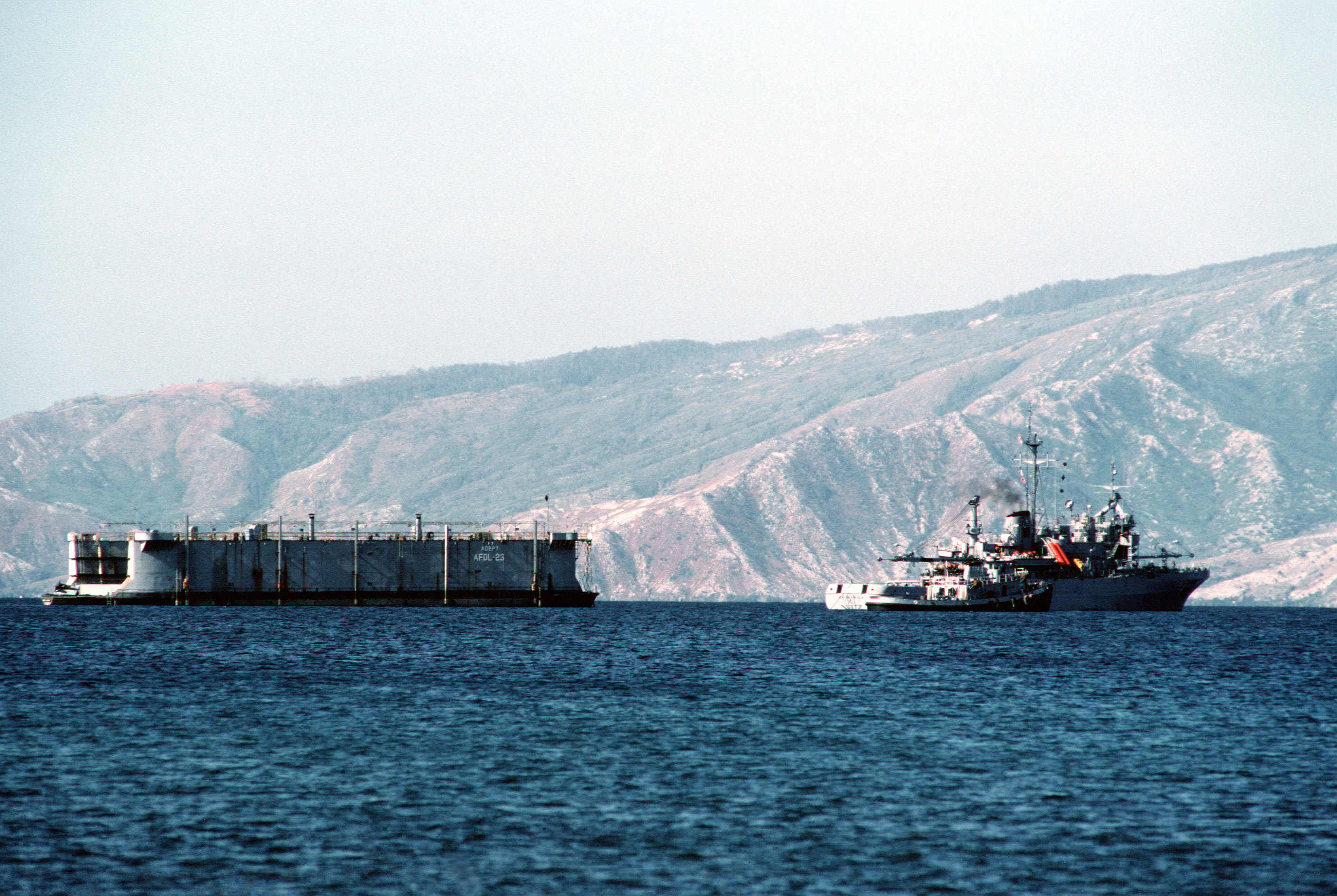
Other side of the towing

== Awards ==
- American Campaign Medal
- Asiatic–Pacific Campaign Medal
- World War II Victory Medal
- National Defense Service Medal
