= One Downtown =

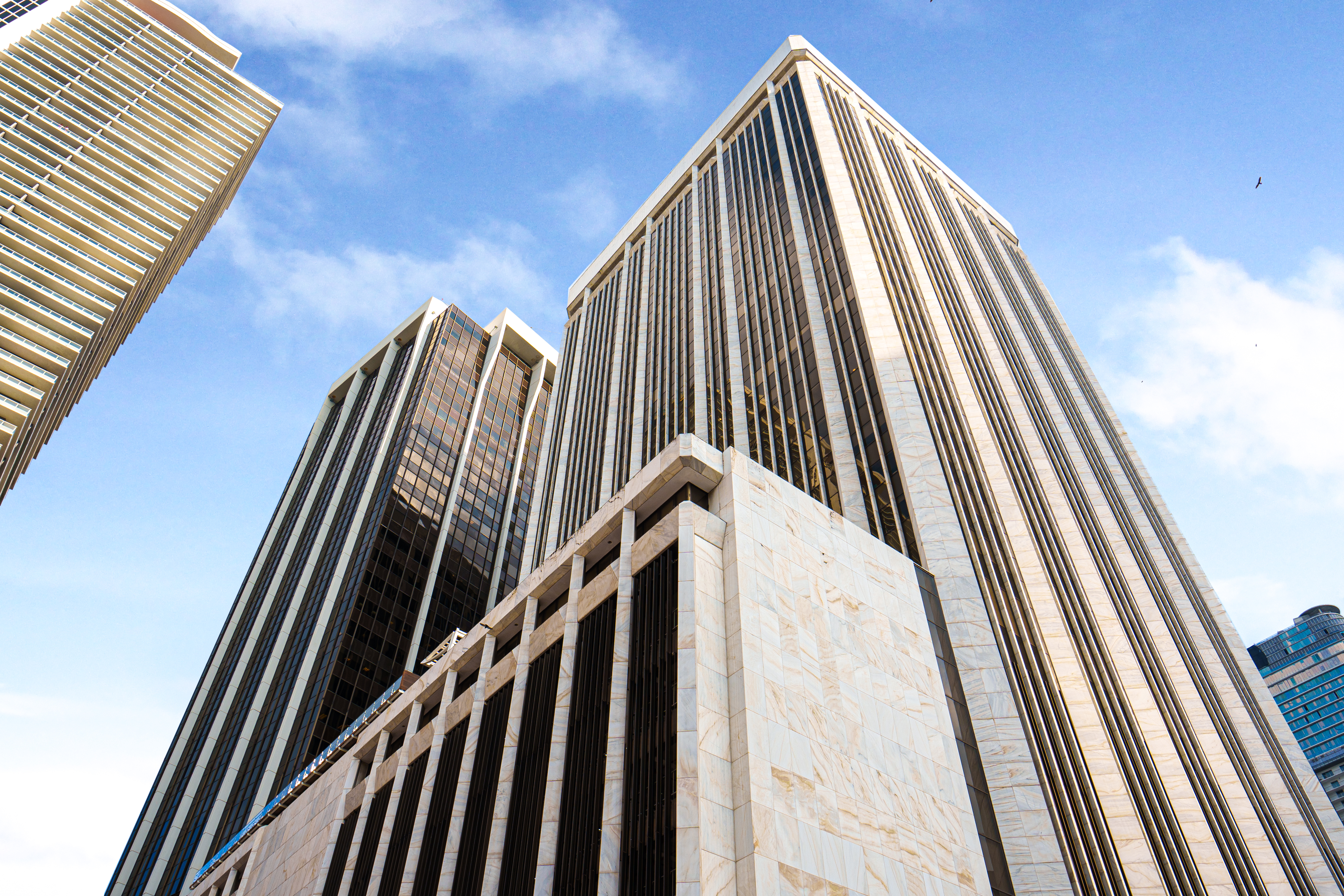
- One Downtown from the southwest
- Interactive map of the One Downtown area
- Former names: SunTrust International Center

General information
- Type: Office
- Location: Southeast 1st Street Miami, Florida, United States
- Coordinates: 25.773994°N 80.188769°W
- Completed: 1973
- Opening: 1973
- Owner: PCCP

Height
- Roof: 375 ft (114 m)

Technical details
- Floor count: 31
- Floor area: 439,848 square feet (40,863.2 m^{2})

One Downtown is an office skyscraper in Downtown Miami, Florida, United States. Formerly known as SunTrust International Center, it is located in the heart of the Central Business District, on Southeast 1st Street near 3rd Avenue. It is one block west of Biscayne Boulevard. The tower rises from a six-story parking pedestal, and comprises 31 floors. It is 125 m (375 ft) in height, which gives it a very low position on the list of tallest buildings in Miami. However, as the building opened in 1973, it appears in most photographs of the Miami skyline, and is one of the more famous buildings in the city. It sits behind the larger One Biscayne Tower, also completed in the early 1970s, and since the completion of 50 Biscayne, the tower is further obstructed if viewed from Biscayne Bay. The building is the Miami headquarters of SunTrust Bank and is almost entirely composed of Class A office space. It was built by The Auchter Company.

Crocker Partners acquired the building for $82.4 million in 2011. In May 2018, PCCP bought it for $127 million using a $101.8 million mortgage from Invesco.

The nearest Metromover stations are Inner Loop and Bayfront Park.

== See also ==
- List of tallest buildings in Miami
