= Duval County Courthouse =

Local courthouse for Duval County, Florida

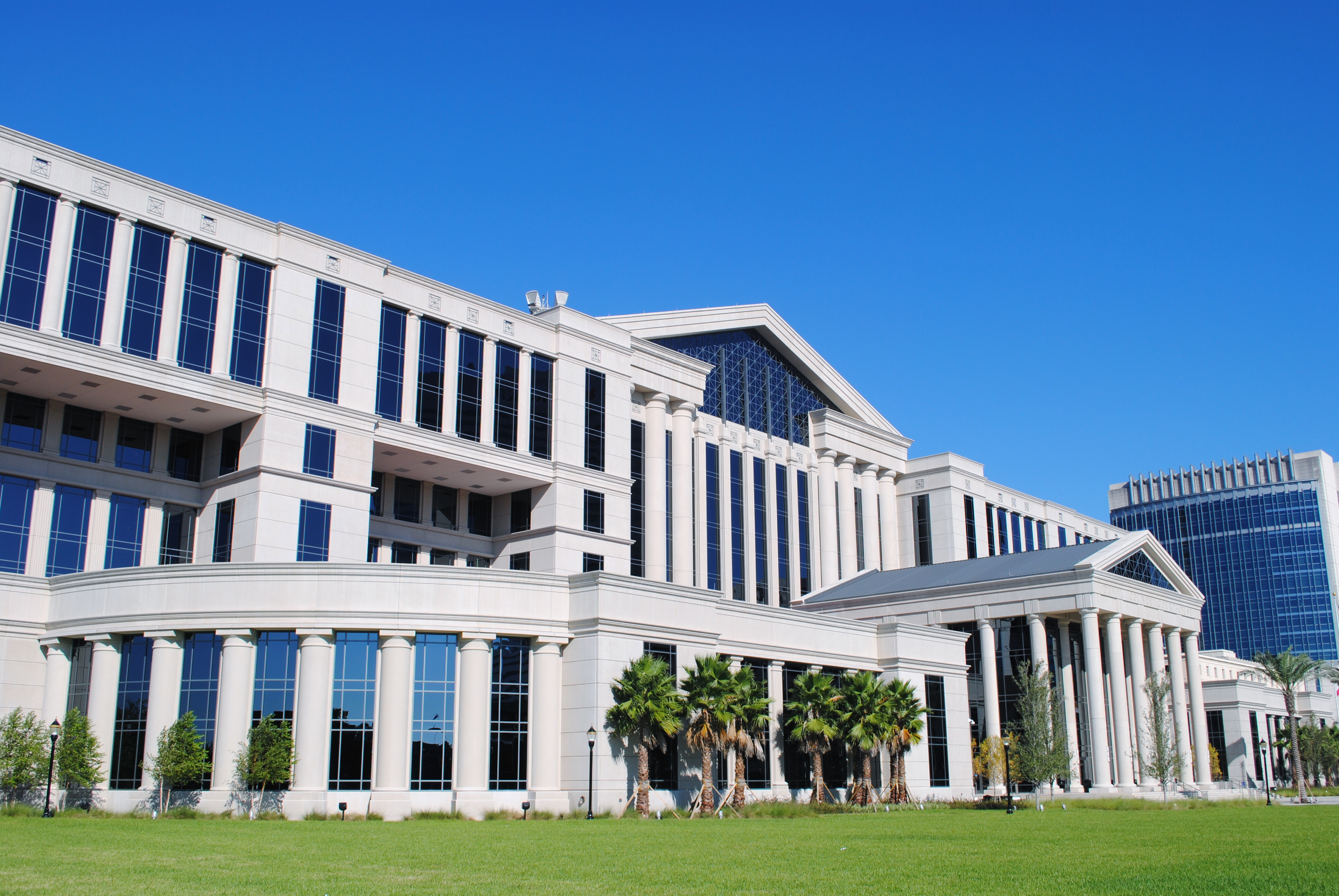
- Interactive map of the Duval County Courthouse area

General information
- Location: 501 W Adams St; Jacksonville, Florida, United States
- Coordinates: 30.33008°N 81.66336°W
- Construction started: 2009
- Completed: 2012
- Client: Duval County, Florida

Design and construction
- Architect: KBJ Architects

The Duval County Courthouse is the local courthouse for Duval County, Florida. It houses courtrooms and judges from the Duval County and Fourth Judicial Circuit Courts. The new facility is located Downtown Jacksonville, Florida; it was built starting in 2009 and opened in 2012.

Duval County was created on August 12, 1822 and was formerly part of St. Johns County. Although the county's area was huge, it took more than twenty years before the first courthouse was constructed during the 1840s. A second courthouse was constructed in 1886, but was burned in the Great Fire of 1901. The third courthouse was constructed in 1902 and closed in 1958. A new courthouse funded by the Better Jacksonville Plan was planned in 2000, but budget issues and rising costs delayed its construction until 2009.

== Previous courthouses ==
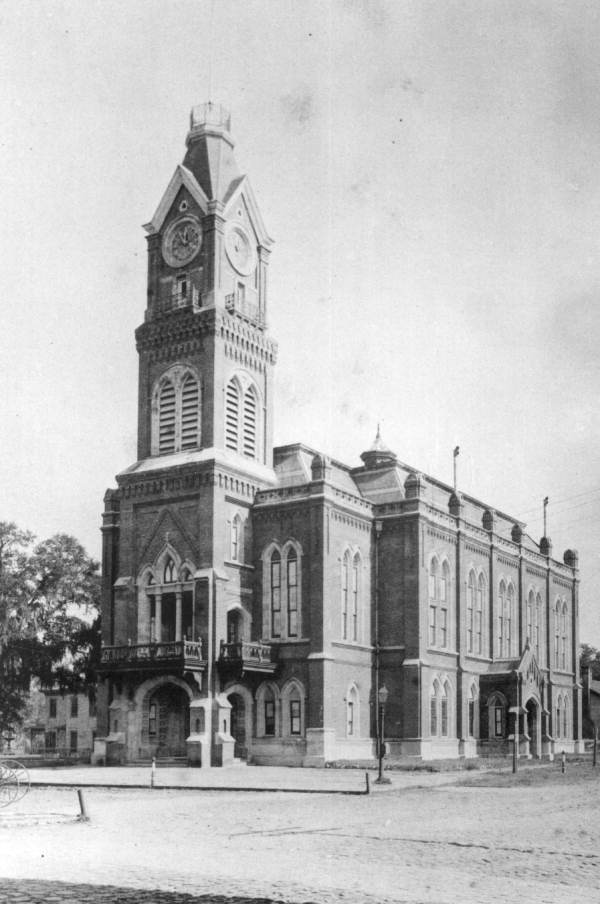
Second courthouse

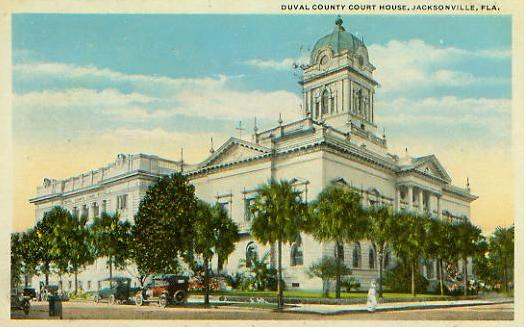
Third courthouse

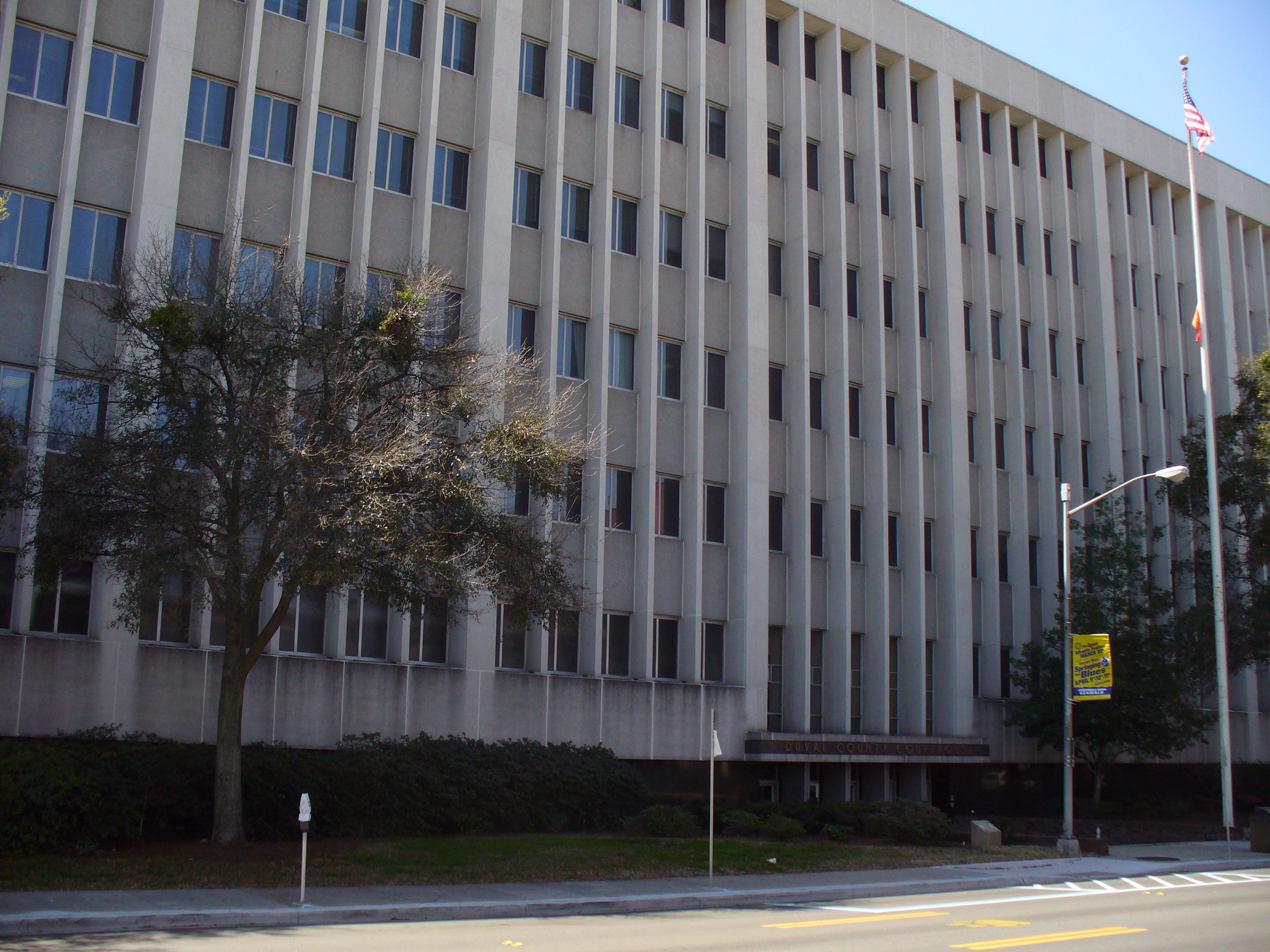
Fourth courthouse

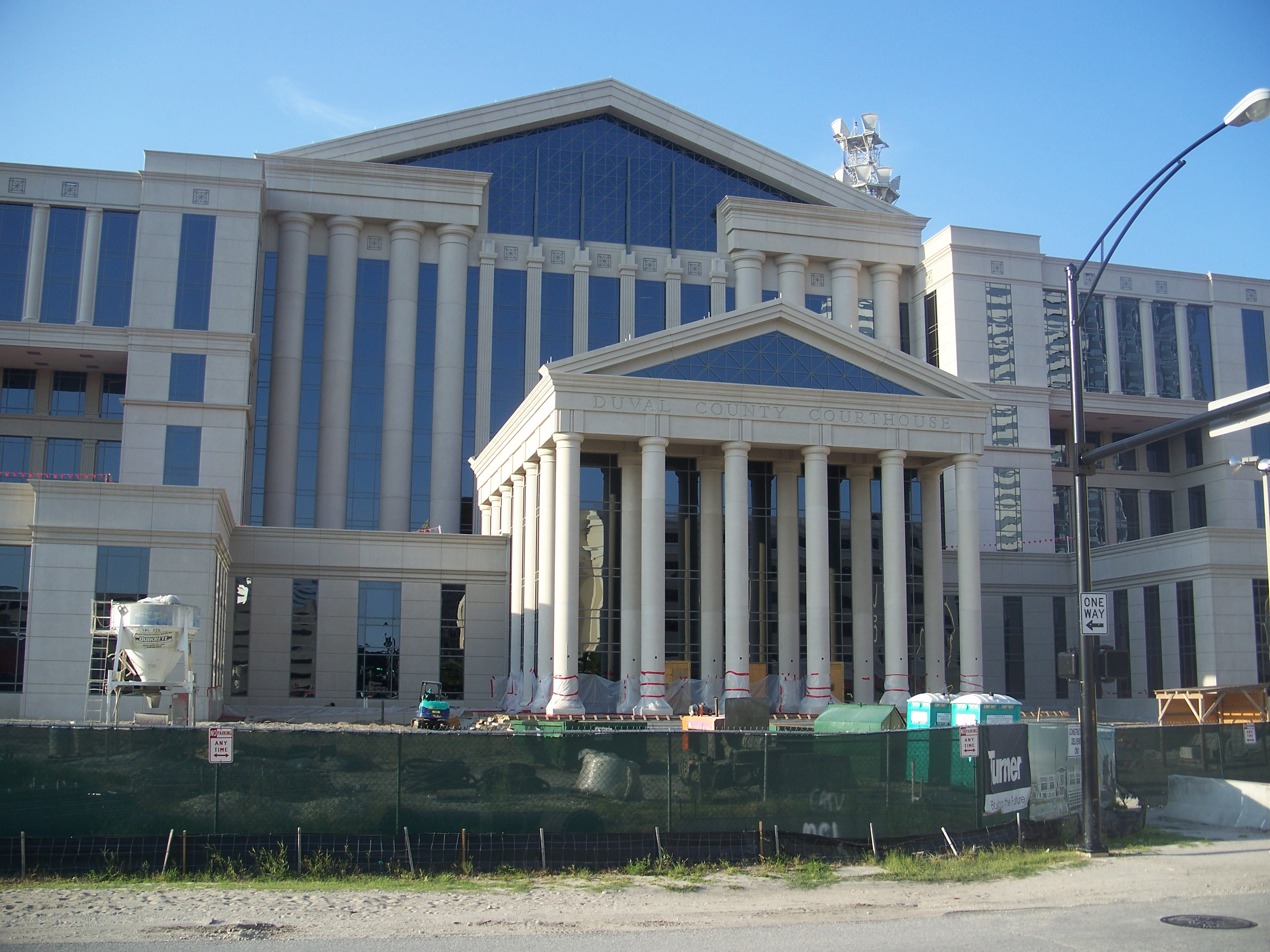
Fifth courthouse

=== First ===
The first courthouse erected in Duval County was constructed of wood during the 1840s where Forsyth and Market Street intersect. It was burned to the ground during the Civil War.

=== Second ===
It took another twenty years before it was replaced with a brick building, constructed in 1886, which lasted until the Great Fire of 1901, which destroyed most of downtown Jacksonville. After the fire, the courthouse was one of the first buildings reconstructed, across the street from the old one. The exterior brick walls of the old courthouse remained mostly intact and were utilized in the creation of a new armory building. That structure became part of the Lanier Building, which was demolished in 2003.

=== Third ===
Rutledge Holmes designed the 1902 courthouse, which had a stone exterior. The architect incorporated up to seven additional floors in the design, but the original building was never expanded. Instead, when additional space was required, an annex was added in 1914, nearly doubling the usable courthouse space.

=== Fourth ===
An architecturally modern courthouse was constructed on East Bay Street and dedicated in 1958, ten years before consolidation and at a time when the entire county's population was just over 450,000. During that same time, Jacksonville built the Haydon Burns Library, Friendship Fountain, Jacksonville Memorial Coliseum, the current Courthouse Annex and the CSX Transportation Building, making the city, “thoroughly modern”. The 1902 courthouse was demolished; the 1914 annex was preserved and later expanded to include the site of the 1902 courthouse. In December 2018 the Fourth courthouse was demolished.

== New courthouse ==
The 2000 Census counted over three-quarters of a million people in Duval County, an increase of 67% since the prior courthouse opened. The Bay Street facility had been overcrowded for many years and additional space was desperately needed. State law required the local government to construct a new facility. Mayor John Delaney proposed the Better Jacksonville Plan, a $2.25 billion package of projects, including a new courthouse. The referendum on the Better Jacksonville Plan passed on September 5, 2000, and planning for the courthouse commenced. Costs were estimated at $190 million, with another $20 million built into the budget for contingency. Construction was awarded to Cannon Design.

In 2003 Delaney left office and was succeeded by John Peyton. Construction continued under Cannon, but budget and size estimates fluctuated. Peyton stopped work on the courthouse complex on October 28, 2004, and fired Cannon and construction managers Skanska Dynamic Partners. At the time, the project had not broken ground, but project design, property acquisition, site work and utility relocation had been completed, at a cost of $64.3 million. Peyton's office cited rising construction costs as part of the reason for the budget deficit.

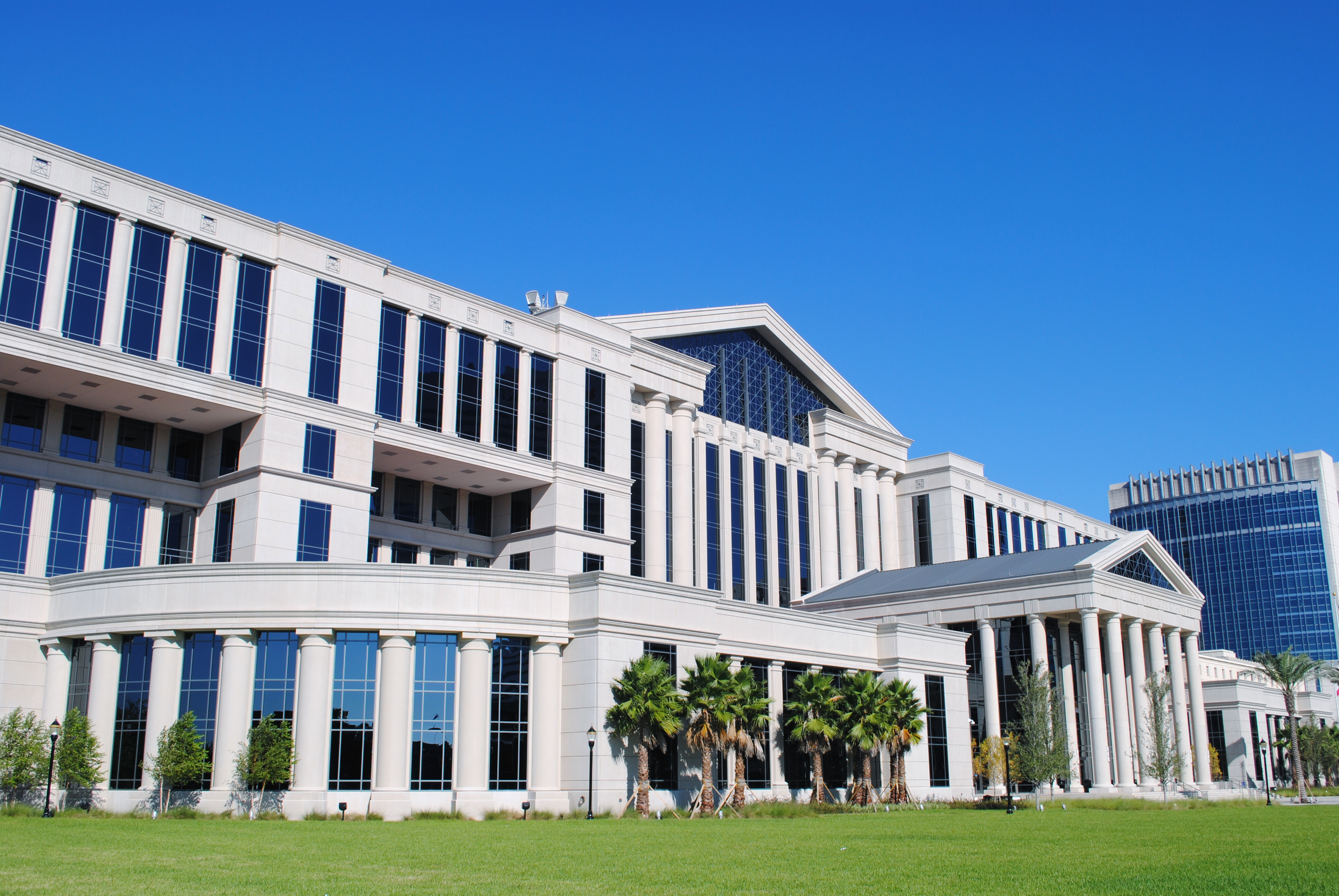
The newly completed Duval County Courthouse

Peyton decided to throw out Cannon's original designs, including completed work, and proposed a new plan. The Jacksonville City Council approved increasing the courthouse budget to $263.5 million in 2006. The project was re-bid, and the team of Perry-McCall Construction and The Auchter Company were initially awarded the contract. When it was discovered that the Auchter Company had financial troubles, the contract was withdrawn. In an attempt to retain the contract, Perry-McCall and Auchter merged to form a new company, but Jacksonville's General Counsel rejected their plan because the new company had not bid on the project.

Second place bidder, Turner Construction Company, which partnered with Technical Construction Services Group and KBJ Architects, was given an opportunity to negotiate a contract with the city in July 2007, by approval of the Competitive Sealed Proposal Evaluation Committee. On November 16, 2007, the Courthouse Architectural Review Committee (CARC) convened to review the new options under consideration by the administration and voted 4-1 to pursue the mayor's recommendation to build one 800,000 square foot facility on the existing LaVilla site using the design from KBJ Architects. Turner Construction was chosen as contractor. Turner Construction is also the company that built VyStar Veterans Memorial Arena in Jacksonville.

Based on that recommendation and after intensive study, the Jacksonville City Council approved a $350 million county courthouse complex in April, 2008 that was supported by Mayor Peyton and Chief Circuit Judge Donald Moran. The council also agreed that any proceeds from the sale of the current riverfront courthouse and the City Hall annex be used to pay for the increased costs of the new courthouse construction.

=== Financial history of the new courthouse ===
Original 2000 BJP budget	$190,000,000
“vertical contingency”	$21,000,000	added by John Delaney
Total BJP funding	$211,000,000
** New Funding **
Court Facilities Trust Fund:	$811,000
Court Documents Facility:	$3,397,000
Traffic Fine Surcharge:	$48,292,000
2nd Approved Budget:	$263,500,000	(2004-1339)
** AdditionalFunding **
COJ Capital Projects:	$86,500,000
TOTAL BUDGET APPROVED^:	$350,000,000	(2008-1111)

^$64.3 million already spent to-date for land acquisition, utility relocation and previous design efforts

=== Progress ===
Construction began in May 2009, with more than 400 workers engaged for over a year. The courthouse was completed in 2012 and opened on June 18, 2012.

== Courthouse lawn ==
The courthouse includes a public green space, known as the Courthouse Lawn.
