= The Auchter Company =

General construction contractor in Florida

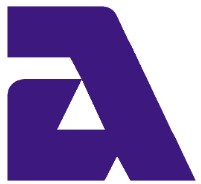
- Company type: Private
- Industry: Engineering; Construction
- Founded: 1929
- Founder: George D. Auchter
- Defunct: December 31, 2007
- Headquarters: Jacksonville, Florida
- Area served: Western Hemisphere
- Key people: George D. Auchter, president; Wilbur H. Glass Jr, president; Dave Auchter; Julia B. Auchter; Brad Glass, president; Jeffrey Glass, sr vice president; Charles R. Diebel, president
- Products: Buildings, bridges, towers and, in 1940s, ships
- Revenue: $750+ million (2007)
- Number of employees: 150 (2007)
- Footnotes / references The Auchter Company was acquired by Perry-Mccall Construction Inc. on March 26, 2007.

The Auchter Company was a general construction contractor based in Jacksonville, Florida. It was established in 1929 by engineer George D. Auchter. The company was among Florida's oldest general construction contractors and built many of Jacksonville's civil and corporate buildings, including the City Hall and ranked among the top design/build firms in the US. The Auchter Company also helped build ships needed for World War II, as part of the US Navy's Emergency Shipbuilding Program. After the war the shipyard closed in February 1946. The company went on to build many buildings and bridges until it was sold on March 26, 2007, to Perry-McCall Construction, Inc.

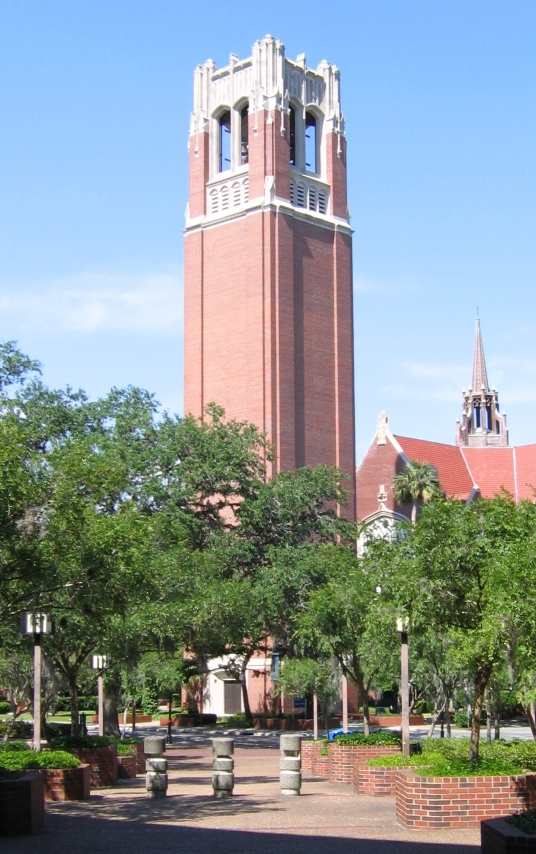
Century Tower, at the University of Florida, built by The Auchter Company

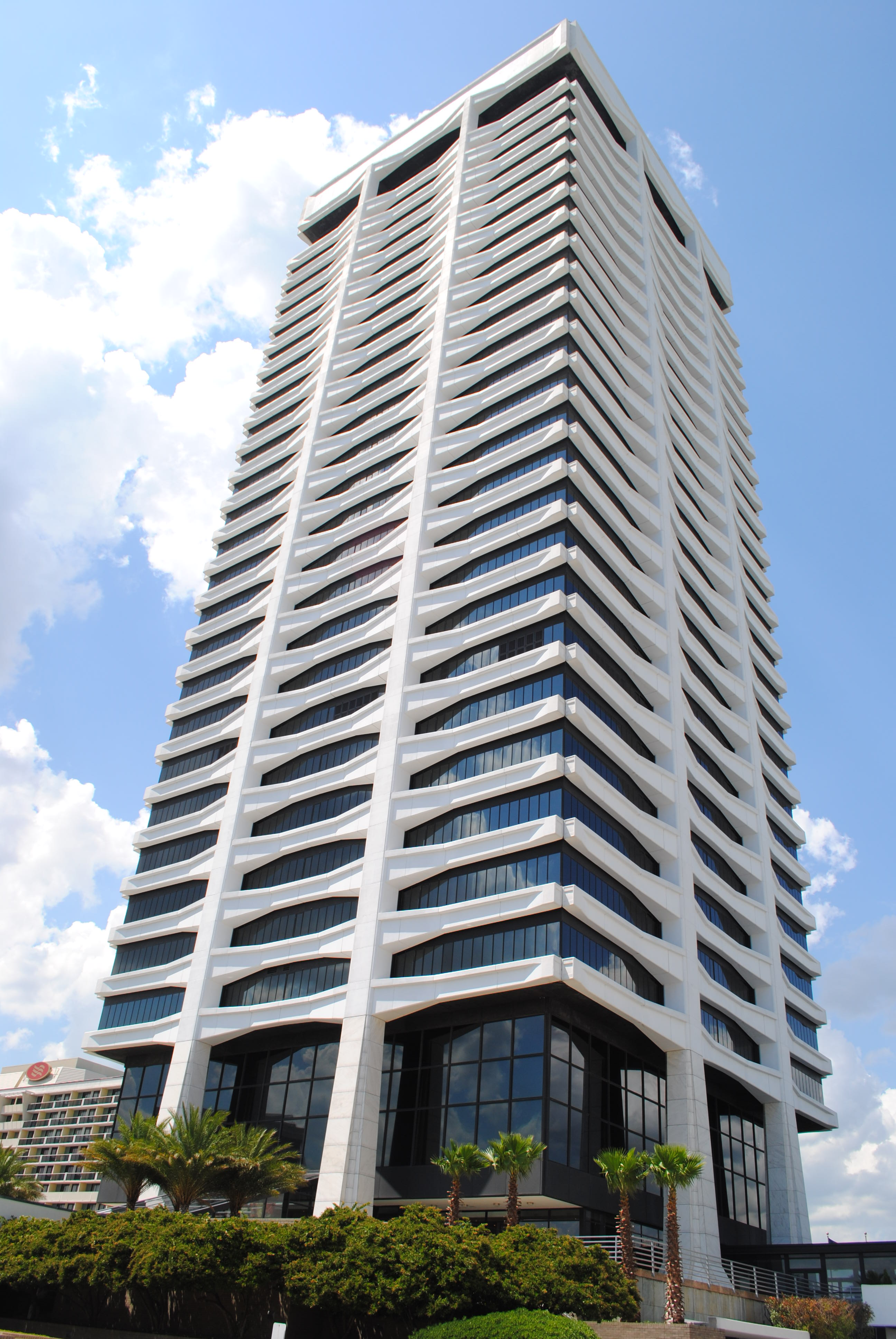
Riverplace Tower in Jacksonville

== Origins ==
George David Auchter was born on January 6, 1889, in Jersey City, New Jersey. The oldest of three children, his father was an engineer. Auchter also trained as an engineer at Rutgers College and was living in Red Bank, New Jersey, when his employer sent him to Florida to work on a bridge project in the early 1920s. At the time, construction in Florida was booming and Auchter saw an opportunity because Jacksonville was "The River City" and Auchter knew bridge construction. He received Florida engineering license #375 in 1922, and initially concentrated on bridges and overpasses, founding the George D. Auchter Company in 1929. George Sr. died in 1974 when George Jr. was running the business.

== Background ==
The Auchter Company did design and engineering work for both on-site construction and pre-construction pieces shipped worldwide. It built office buildings, factories, bridges, warehouses, resorts, churches, museums, residential projects, hospitals, and power generating stations. The company built Jacksonville International Airport, military bases, courthouses, and jails. To support World War II, it built floating repair drydocks for the US Navy. He later sold the company to the Glass family. Dave Auchter, one of the founder's grandsons, later became a company executive.

For the war effort built pulpwood barges, floating repair drydocks, and concrete ships. After the war, he continued in civil construction and high-rise projects. Wishing to retire, George Auchter Jr. sold the company to an investor group in 1981. He died in 1986.

One of the investors was Wilbur H. Glass Jr., whose father Wilbur H Glass Sr had been President of the Auchter Company for 14 years. Glass Jr also had a civil engineering degree, having joined the US Army as a field engineer in 1957. He worked at the Auchter Company, initially as a project manager and became a vice president in 1979. Glass bought out the other investors in 1993, and kept the Auchter Company name. The company continued its tradition of building Jacksonville's major works and expanded to other Florida locations. Glass also moved the company into retail service, such as Gate Petroleum convenience stores and three big-box Target stores in the North Florida area.

In 1999, the Auchter Company moved its headquarters to a First Coast Technology Park on the University of North Florida's campus. The new 3.36 acre headquarters helped build the company's relationship with the university. Glass's son, Brad Glass earned a degree in business administration from the University of North Florida and joined The Auchter Company in 1995. Jeff Glass, Wilbur's other son, started with the company in 1978. In 1993 Wilbur made both of his sons partners in ownership. Jeff retired in 2004 and Brad later went on to become president. In 2000, another of George Auchter's grandsons, Dave Auchter, became Director of Corporate Development after working as media director for World Golf Village and the National Football League's Jacksonville Jaguars.

In 2006, the team of Perry-Mccall Construction Inc. and the Auchter Company bid on the new Duval County Courthouse. They were initially awarded the contract, but when it was discovered that the Auchter Company had financial troubles, the contract was withdrawn. In an attempt to retain the contract, Perry-Mccall Construction purchased the Auchter Company on March 26, 2007. Jacksonville's General Counsel rejected their plan because the new company did not bid on the project. The merger was terminated, and on December 31, 2007, Auchter closed its doors.

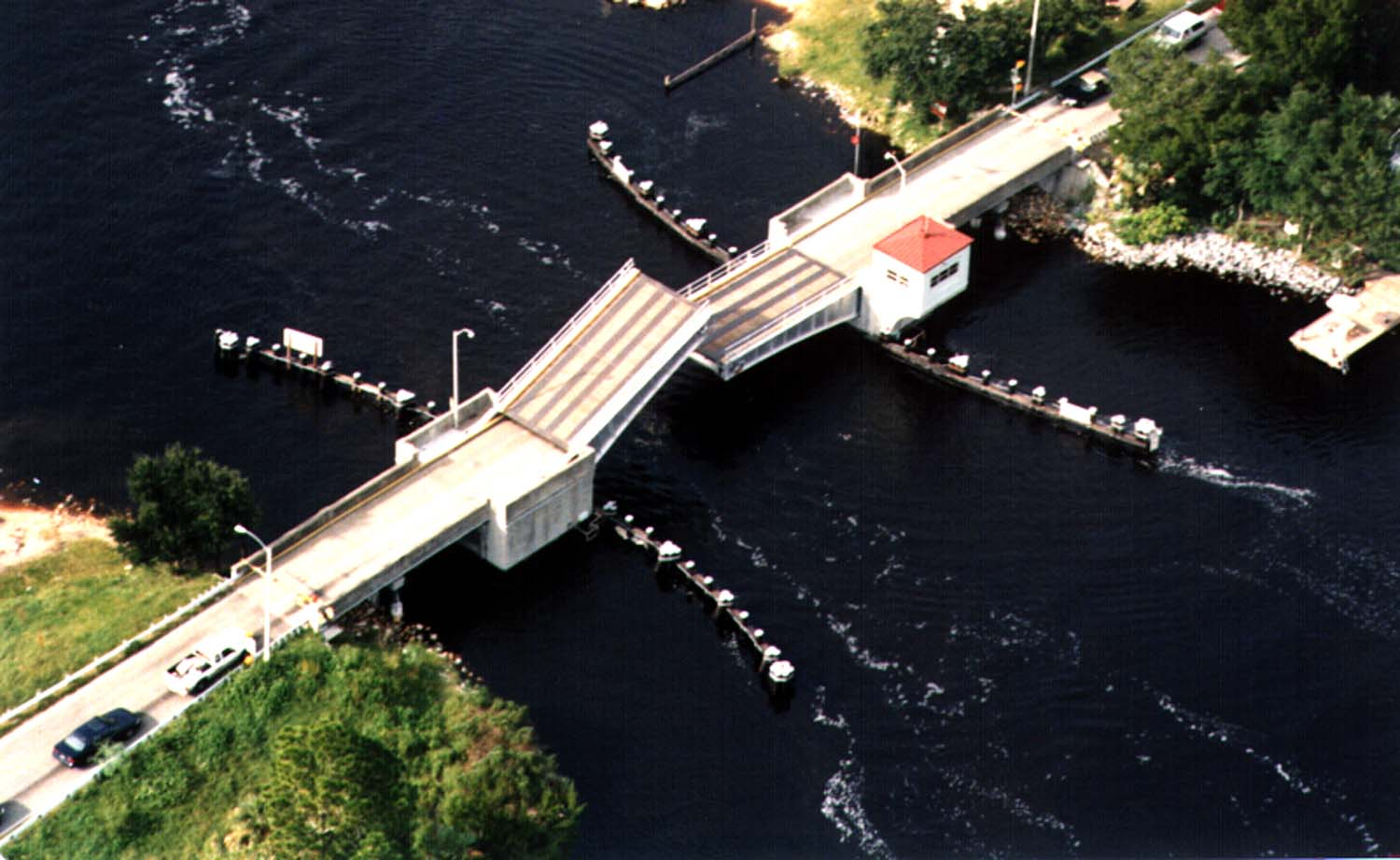
The old 1937 Palm Valley drawbridge, built by The Auchter Company that was demolished and replaced in 2002

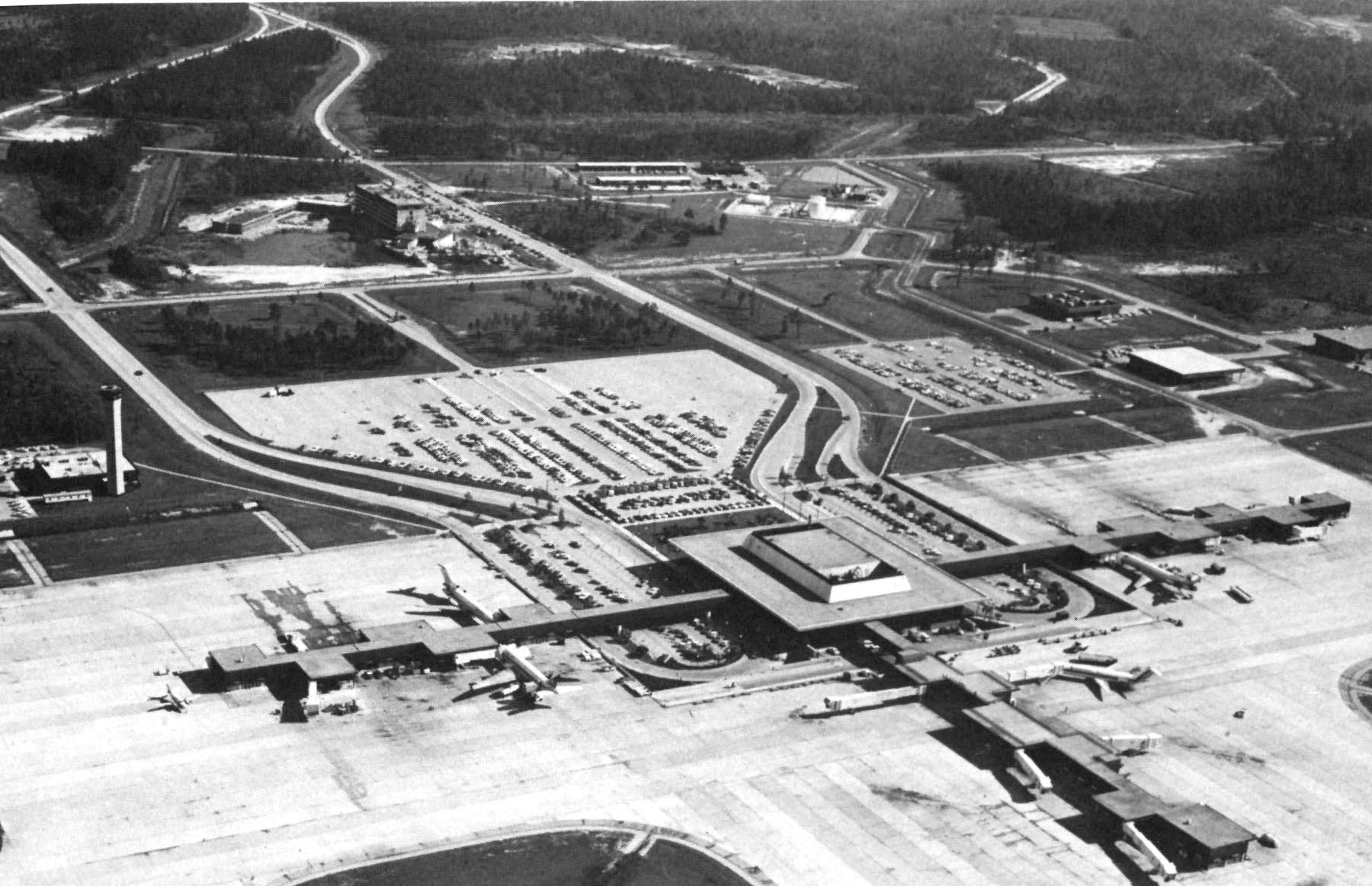
Jacksonville International Airport circa 1968

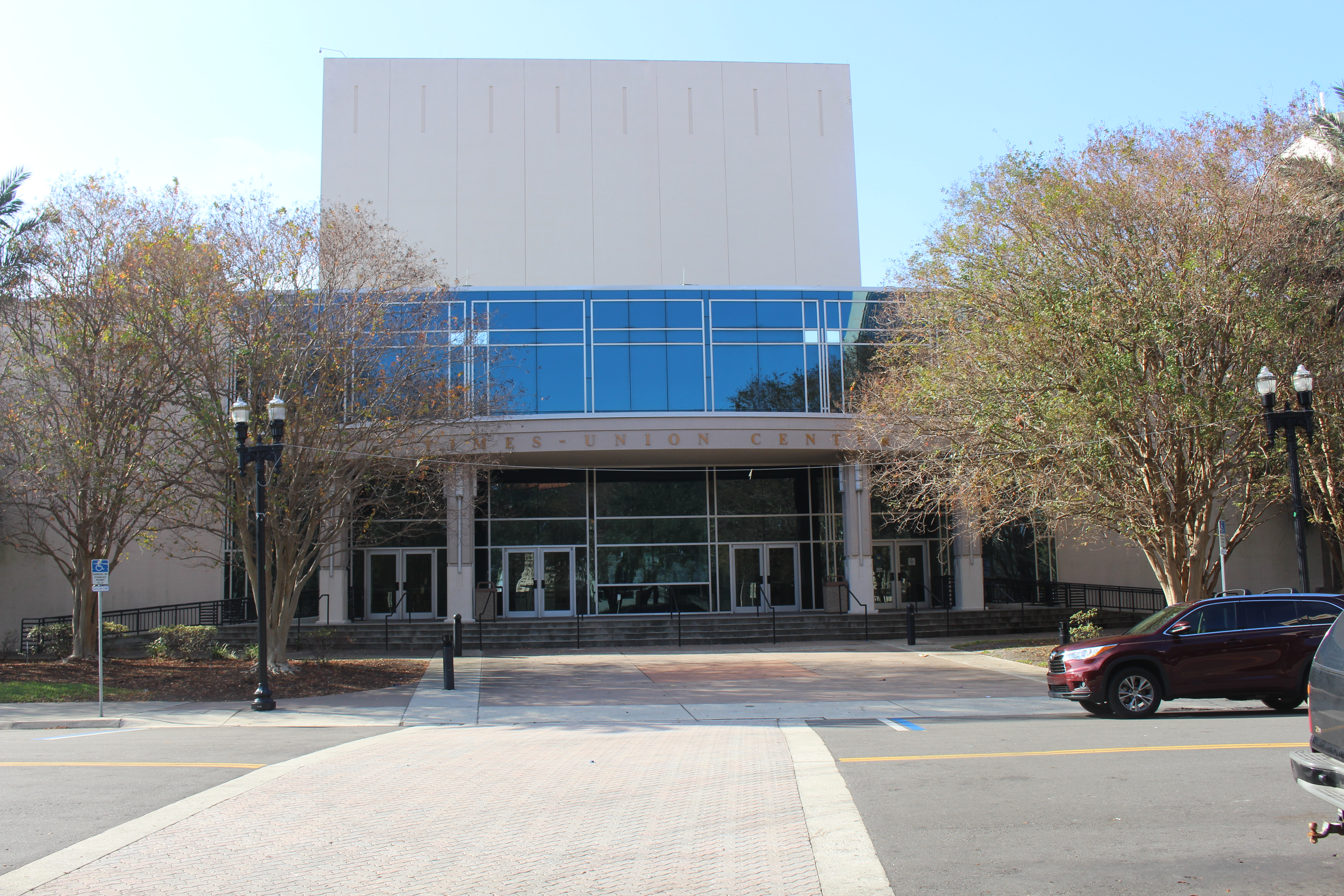
Jacksonville Civic Auditorium (1962) now the Times-Union Center for the Performing Arts

- Humana Building (1985)
- Jacksonville Public Library (2005)
- Riverplace Tower (1967) (formerly Gulf Life Tower)
- BellSouth Tower Jacksonville, now TIAA Bank Center (1982)
- SunTrust International Center (1974)
- Western Union Telegraph buildings (1931) now the Museum of Contemporary Art Jacksonville
- EverBank Center (1998)
- Parts of the Naval Air Station Jacksonville
- Navy's Mayport officers' quarters by the St. Johns River
- Merrill-Stevens Drydock & Repair Co.
- St. Regis Paper Company Factory
- Maxwell House Coffee Plant
- Anheuser Busch Yeast Plant
- Two Prudential Plaza (1985)
- Ponte Vedra Inn and Club
- Amelia Island Plantation
- Jacksonville Port Authority Wharf
- Parts of the Jacksonville's St. Vincent's Medical Center
- Century Tower (University of Florida)(1953) and Gym and another building
- Old Duval County Courthouse (1958)
- Jacksonville International Airport (1965)
- Jacksonville Civic Auditorium (1962)
- Baptist Health Center Downtown
- First Baptist Church of Jacksonville (1993)
- Haydon Burns Library, (1965) now Jessie Ball duPont Center downtown
- Jacksonville's Hendricks Avenue Overpass
- Haines Street Expressway
- Beach Boulevard Intercostal Waterway Bridge in Jacksonville Beach
- Amelia Island River Bridge in Fernandina
- Vilano Bridge in St. Augustine
- Nassau County Courthouse

== Ships built ==
=== Small Auxiliary Floating Dry Docks (AFD - AFDL) ===
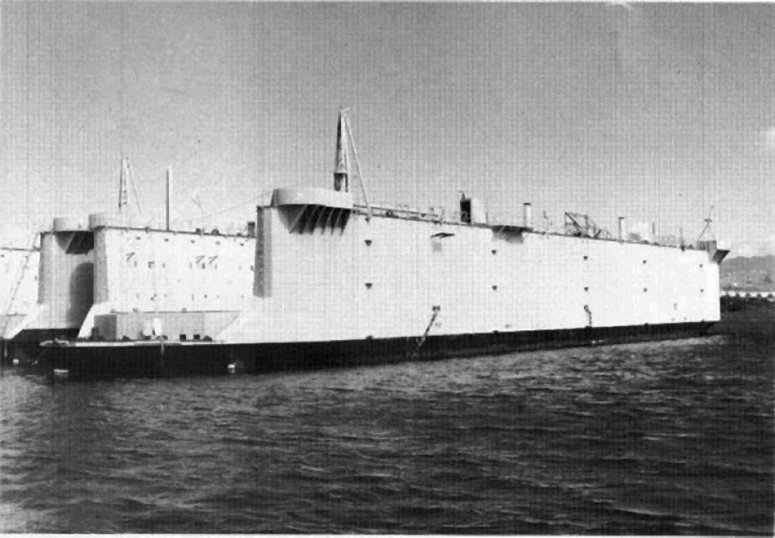
USS Adept (AFD-23) built by The Auchter Company in 1944

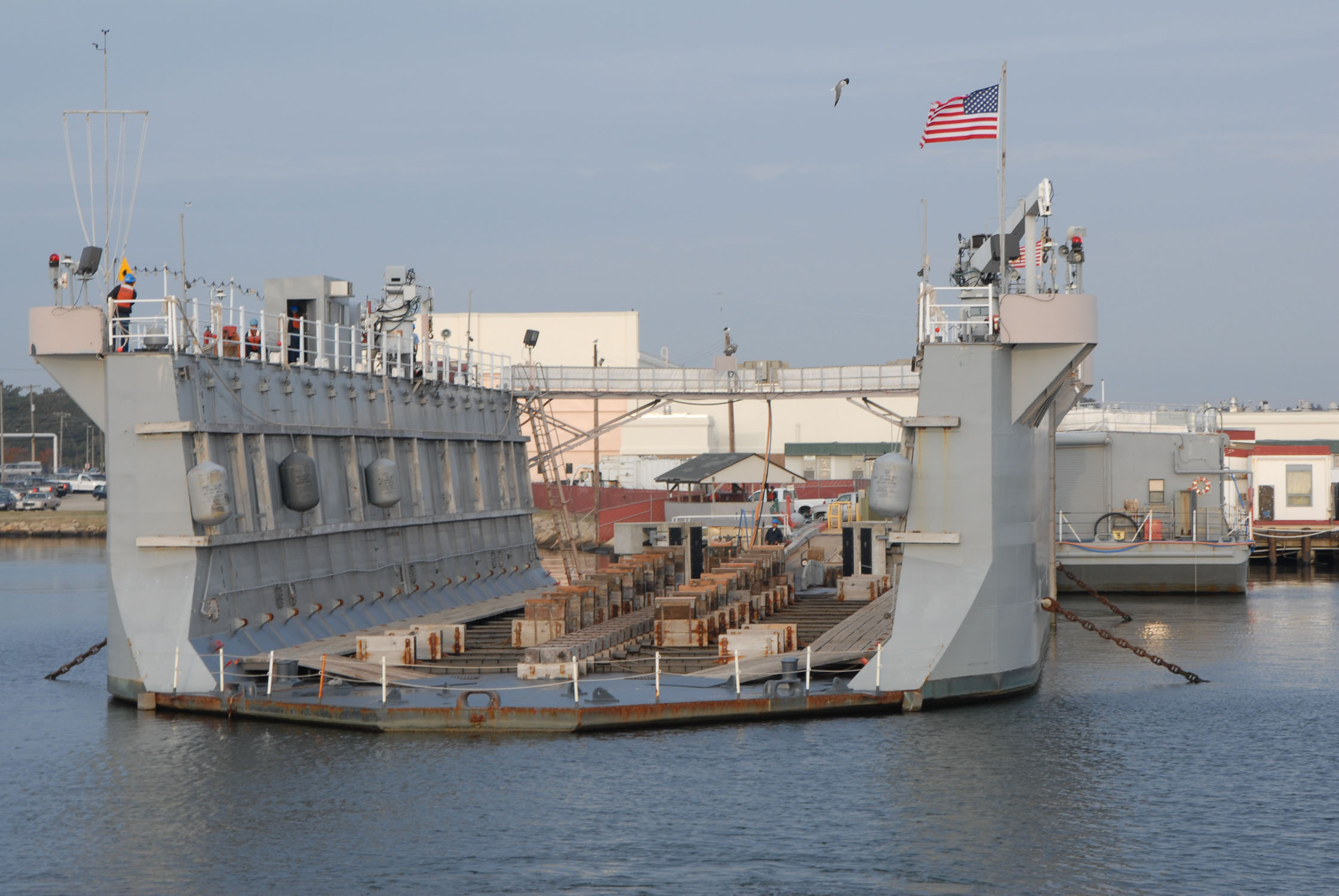
AFD-23 sister ship USS Dynamic (AFD-6)-AFDL-6 on Nov. 2, 2006

The Auchter Company built Auxiliary Floating Docks, Light (AFDL) for the US Navy. They were also called Auxiliary Floating Docks (AFD). AFDs were 288 ft long, had a beam of 64 ft (20 m), and draft of 3 ft 3 in empty and 31 ft 4 in (9.55 m) flooded to load a ship. A normal crew was 60 men. AFDLs displaced 1,200 tons and could lift 1,900 tons to take a ship out the water for repair. AFDLs were built as one piece, open at both ends. AFDLs had a crew of 30 to 130 men, living in a barge alongside the AFDL. Used to repair small crafts, PT boats and small submarines, all AFDs were reclassified AFDL after the war in 1946.

- USS AFD-19 - AFDL-19 served in Dunstaffnage a Scottish village, sold and moved to Jacksonville, Florida
- USS AFD-20 - AFDL-20 served American Samoa
- USS AFD-21 - AFDL-21
- USS AFD-22 - AFDL-22
- USS Adept (AFD-23) - AFDL-23
