= List of tallest buildings in Jacksonville =

Skyline of Jacksonville
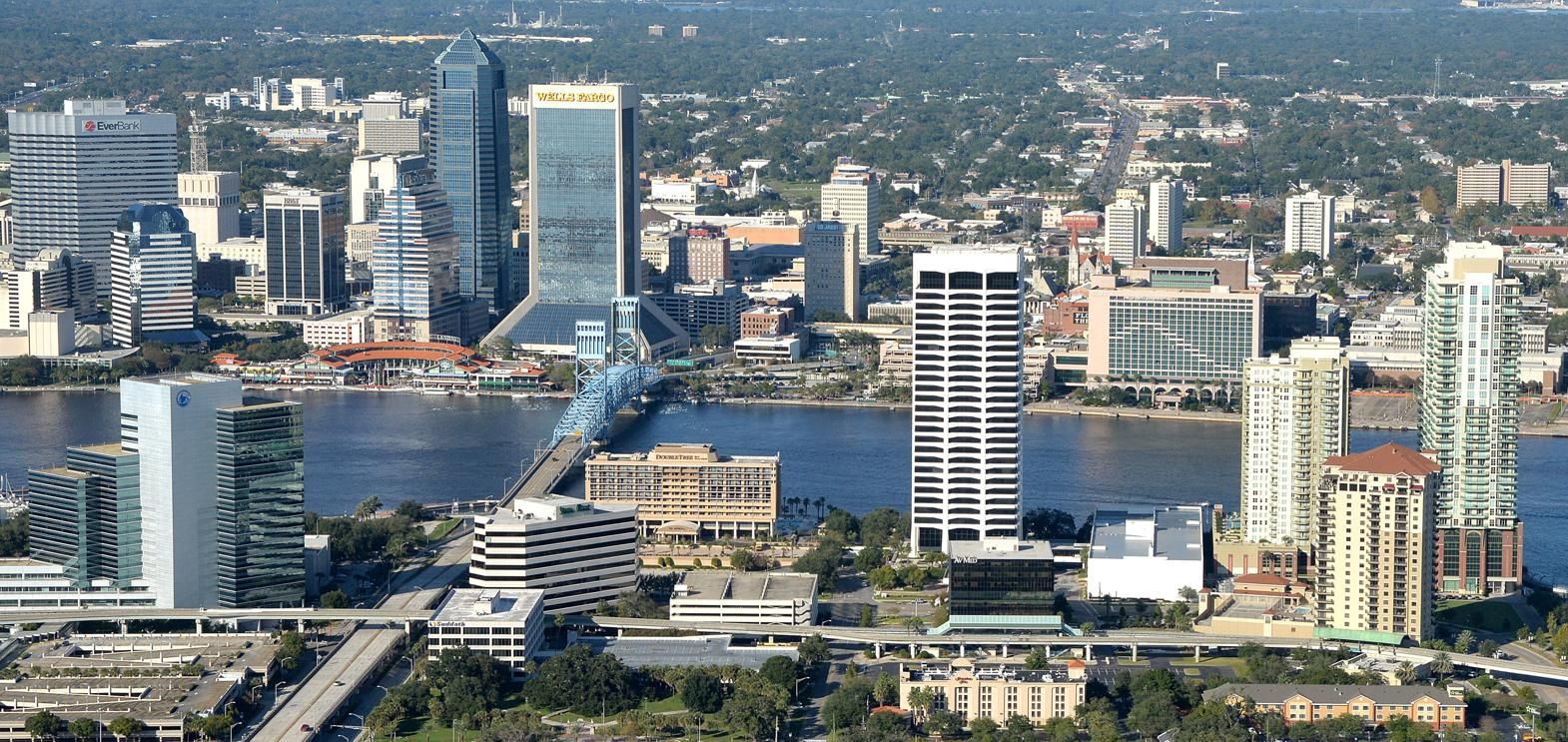
- Downtown Jacksonville in 2021
- Tallest building: Bank of America Tower (1990)
- Tallest building height: 617 ft (188.1 m)
- First 150 m+ building: 1 Independent Square (1974)

Number of tall buildings (2026)
- Taller than 100 m (328 ft): 6
- Taller than 150 m (492 ft): 2

Number of tall buildings — feet
- Taller than 200 ft (61.0 m): 23
- Taller than 300 ft (91.4 m): 9

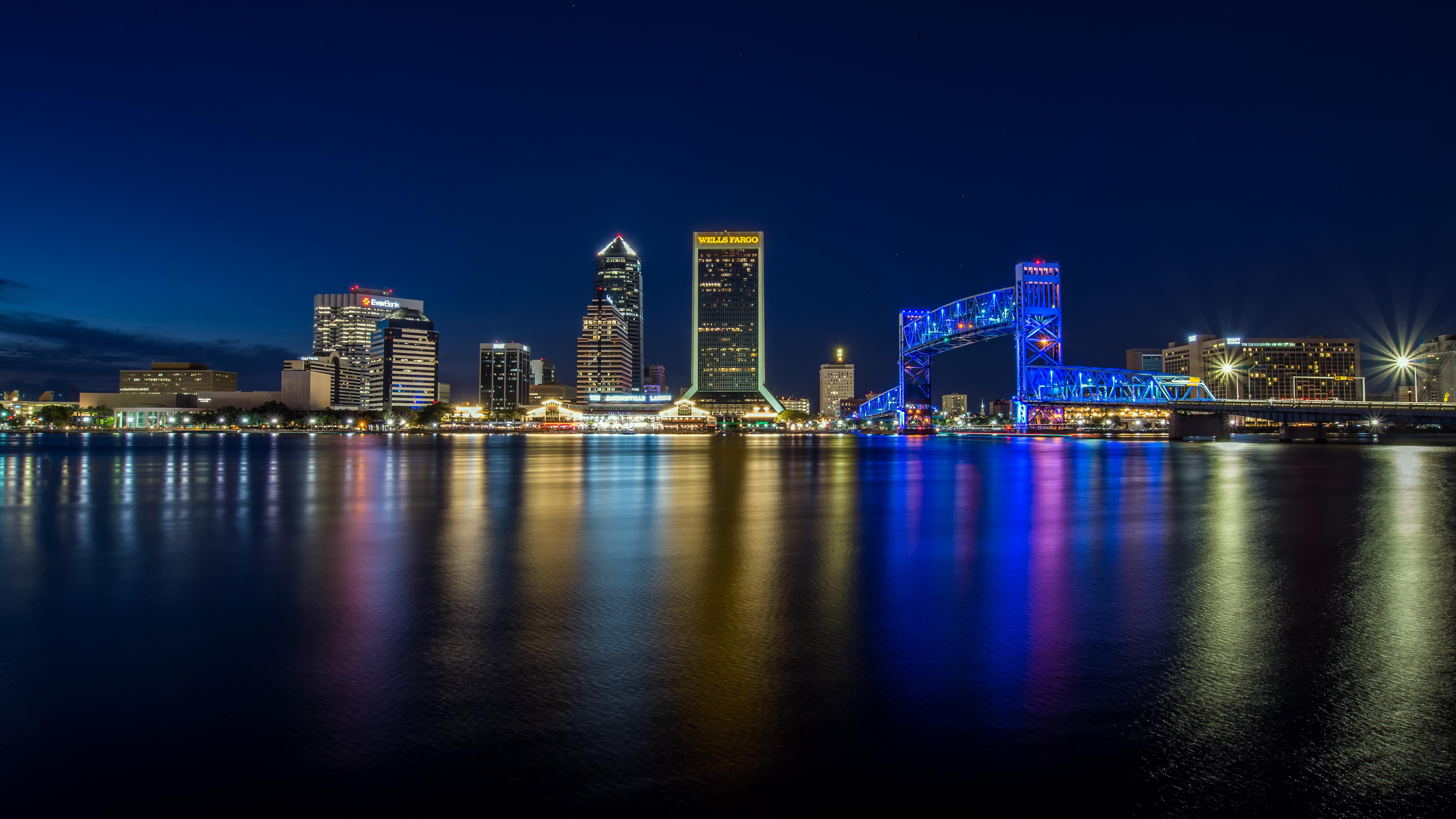
Jacksonville's skyline at night

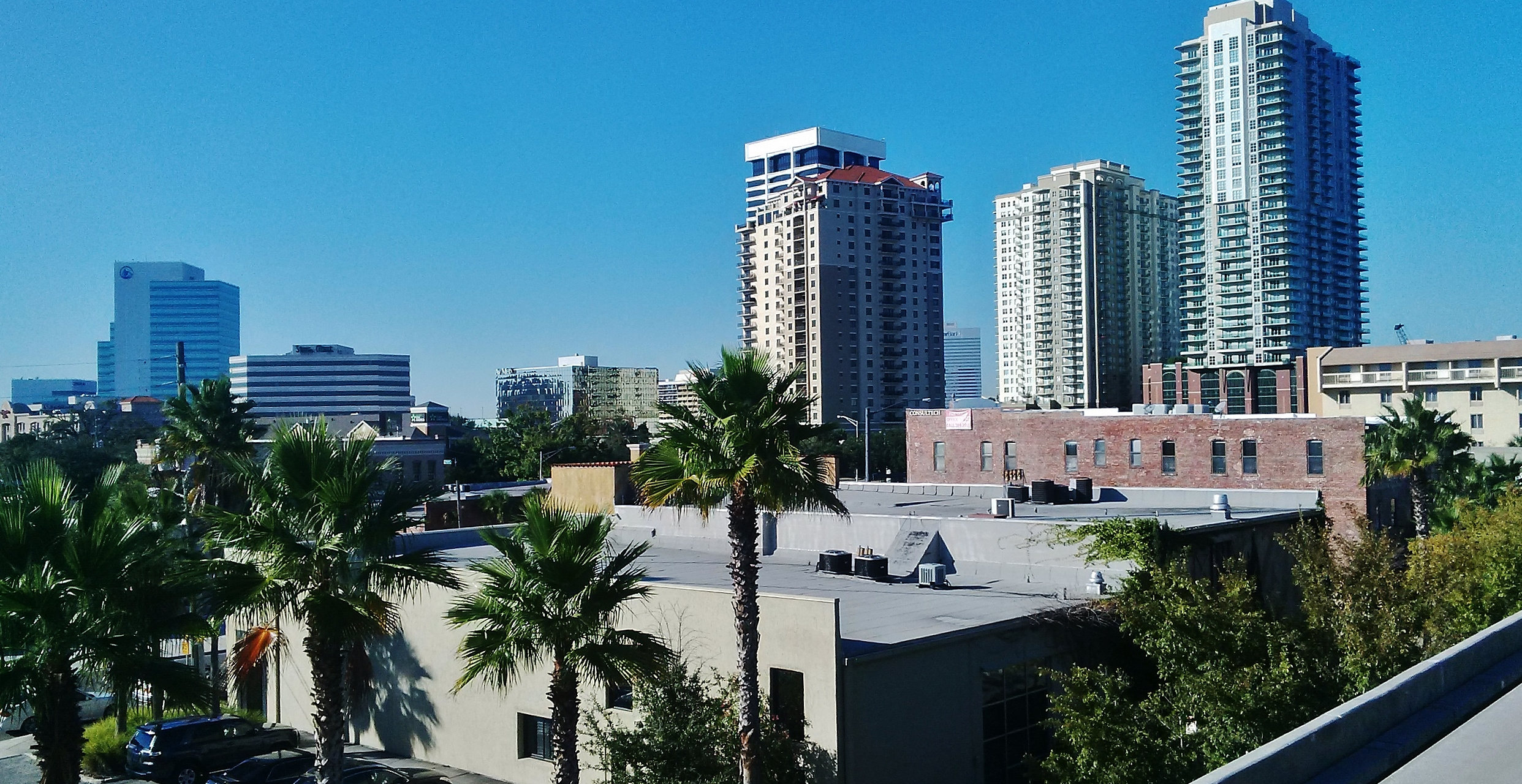
Southbank in 2014

Jacksonville is the most populous city in the U.S. state of Florida, while its metropolitan area is the fourth-largest in the state, with 1.76 million inhabitants. The city is home to 23 buildings that stand over 200 feet (61 m) tall as of 2026, nine of which exceed 300 feet (91 m) in height. Two skyscrapers reach a height of 492 ft (150 m), the most of any city in Florida outside the Miami and Tampa metropolitan areas. The tallest building in Jacksonville is the Bank of America Tower, which is 617 feet (188 m) tall and was built in 1990. The second tallest building in Jacksonville is the 535 ft (163 m) tall 1 Independent Square, which was formerly the city's tallest building from 1974 to 1990.

The earliest high-rises in Jacksonville appeared in the early 20th century. The city's first skyscraper is variously considered to be 121 Atlantic Place or the Bisbee Building; both buildings were completed in 1909. The Bisbee Building and the 11-story Florida Life Building, built in 1911, were part of the Laura Street Trio, a group of three buildings constructed in the wake of the city's Great Fire of 1901. The Florida Life Building was followed by the 15-story Heard National Bank Building in 1913; both buildings held the title of Florida's tallest building. In the 1920s, a construction boom led to the addition of the Barnett National Bank Building and 11 East Forsyth, the city's first buildings taller than 200 ft (61 m), in 1926.

After a lull in skyscraper development in the 1930s and 1940s following the onset of the Great Depression, high-rise construction resumed. One Prudential Plaza was built in 1954, reaching 309 ft (94 m) in height. It was overtaken by the 432 ft (132 m) Riverplace Tower, then the world's tallest precast, post-tensioned concrete structure, in 1967. 1 Independent Square, built in 1974, was the last building in Jacksonville to hold the title of Florida's tallest building, which it lost to One Tampa City Center in 1981. In the 2000s, residential condominium towers such as The Peninsula were added to the downtown skyline. Since the Great Recession, few tall buildings have been constructed in Jacksonville, leaving the skyline relatively unchanged from the late 2000s.

Most of the city's tallest buildings are located in Downtown Jacksonville, which is bisected by the St. Johns River. The downtown core is north of the river and has a greater concentration of high-rises, including the city's two tallest skyscrapers. The tallest building in Southbank, the section of downtown south of the river, is The Peninsula, followed by Riverplace Tower. Besides its high-rises, the Main Street Bridge, nicknamed the 'Blue Bridge' for its color, is one of the skyline's most recognizable features.

== History ==
Number of buildings by height in Jacksonville by the end of each year, based on the information in this article. Click on the legend to toggle a specific height on or off. View chart definition.

== Cityscape ==
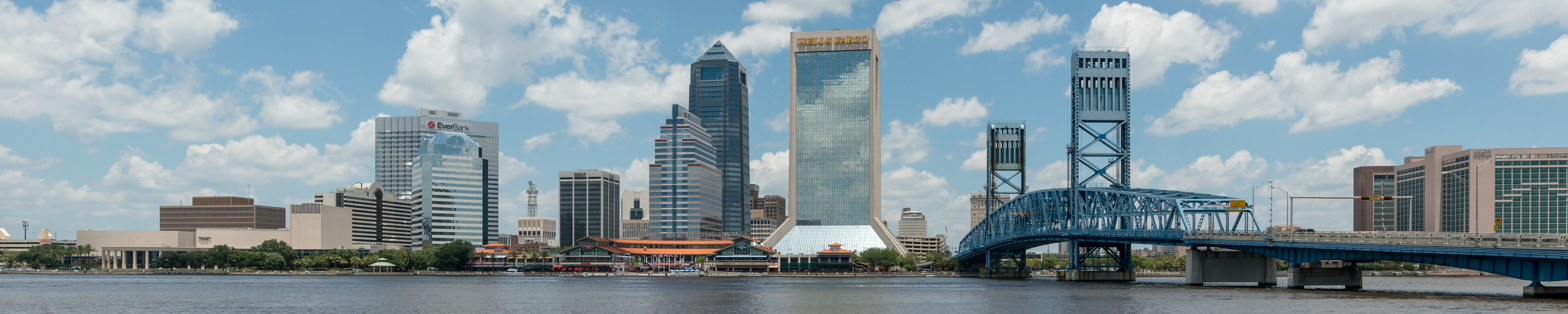
Skyline of Jacksonville in 2016 on the St. Johns River, looking north. To the right of 1 Independence Square (center) is the Main Street Bridge.

== Map of tallest buildings ==
The map below shows the location of every building taller than 200 ft (61 m) in Jacksonville. Each marker is numbered by the building's height rank, and colored by the decade of its completion.

Buildings taller than 200 ft (61 m) in Jacksonville.
- 1950s and before
- 1960s
- 1970s
- 1980s
- 1990s
- 2000s
- 2010s
- 2020s
1 Bank of America Tower
2 1 Independent Square
3 The Peninsula
4 EverBank Center
5 Riverplace Tower
6 VyStar Tower
7 The Strand
8 Eight Forty One
9 Two Prudential Plaza
10 One Enterprise Center
11 Florida Blue Building
12 200 W Forsyth
13 John Milton Bryan Simpson United States Courthouse
14 JEA Tower
15 The Plaza Condominium at Berkman Plaza and Marina
16 233 West Duval
17 CSX Transportation Building
18 San Marco Place
19 Baptist Medical Pavilion
20 Barnett National Bank Building
21 11 East Forsyth
22 Hyatt Regency Jacksonville
23 FIS World Headquarters

== Tallest buildings ==
This list ranks completed buildings in Jacksonville that stand at least 200 ft (61 m) tall as of 2026, based on standard height measurement. This includes spires and architectural details but does not include antenna masts. The “Year” column indicates the year of completion. Buildings tied in height are sorted by year of completion with earlier buildings ranked first, and then alphabetically.

Was the tallest building in Jacksonville upon completion

Rank	Name	Image	Location	Height ft (m)	Floors	Year	Purpose	Notes
1	Bank of America Tower		50 North Laura Street 30°19′37″N 81°39′35″W	617 (188.1)	42	1990	Office	Formerly known as the Barnett Center until 1999. Tallest building in Jacksonville since 1990. Tallest building in Jacksonville completed in the 1990s.
2	1 Independent Square		1 Independent Drive 30°19′33″N 81°39′32″W	535 (163.1)	37	1974	Office	Formerly known as the Independent Life Building from 1974 to 1995, the AccuStaff Building from 1995 to 2002, the Modis Building from 2002 to 2011, and the Wells Fargo Center from 2011 to 2024. Tallest building in Florida from 1974 to 1981, when the One Tampa City Center was built. Tallest building in Jacksonville completed in the 1970s.
3	The Peninsula		1401 Riverplace Boulevard 30°19′09″N 81°39′17″W	437 (133.2)	36	2006	Residential	Tallest residential building in Jacksonville. Tallest building in Jacksonville completed in the 2000s.
4	EverBank Center		301 West Bay Street 30°19′39″N 81°39′44″W	435 (132.6)	32	1983	Office	Formerly known as TIAA Bank Center, the BellSouth (Southern Bell) Tower and the AT&T Tower. Tallest building in Jacksonville completed in the 1980s.
5	Riverplace Tower		1301 Riverplace Boulevard 30°19′10″N 81°39′24″W	432 (131.7)	28	1967	Office	Formerly known as the Gulf Life Tower. Was the world's tallest precast, post-tensioned concrete structure until 2002. Tallest building in Jacksonville completed in the 1960s. Tallest building in Jacksonville from 1967 to 1974.
6	VyStar Tower		76 South Laura Street 30°19′33″N 81°39′36″W	357 (108.8)	24	1989	Office	Purchased by VyStar Credit Union as its new headquarters in 2018. Formerly known as Jacksonville Center, the Humana Building, and Suntrust Tower.
7	The Strand		1401 Riverplace Boulevard 30°19′09″N 81°39′19″W	317 (96.6)	28	2006	Residential	Sold for $53.3 million in 2021, fetching a record price per apartment in Jacksonville.
8	Eight Forty One		841 Prudential Drive 30°19′03″N 81°39′48″W	309 (94.2)	22	1954	Office	Tallest building in Jacksonville from 1954 to 1967. Previously known as Aetna Building, the Prudential Building, and One Prudential Plaza. Tallest building in Jacksonville completed in the 1950s.
9	Two Prudential Plaza		San Marco Boulevard 30°19′05″N 81°39′35″W	305 (92.9)	21	1985	Office	
10	One Enterprise Center		225 Water Street 30°19′33″N 81°39′42″W	299 (91.1)	21	1986	Office	Previously known as the Wells Fargo Tower, Wachovia Tower, First Union Bank Tower, and Florida National Bank Building.
11	Florida Blue Building		532 Riverside Avenue 30°19′11″N 81°40′34″W	287 (87.5)	19	1971	Office	The tower was added next to a 10-story structure constructed in 1950. Also known as the Blue Cross Blue Shield Building.
12	200 W Forsyth		200 West Forsyth Street 30°19′38″N 81°39′39″W	278 (84.7)	18	1974	Office	Formerly known as BB&T Tower, Truist Tower, and the SunTrust Bank Building.
13	John Milton Bryan Simpson United States Courthouse		300 North Hogan Street 30°19′47″N 81°39′38″W	278 (84.6)	15	2002	Government	Tallest courthouse in Jacksonville.
14	JEA Tower		21 West Church Street 30°19′50″N 81°39′26″W	268 (81.7)	19	1963	Office	Originally known as the Universal-Marion Building until 1988, when it was purchased by JEA.
15	The Plaza Condominium at Berkman Plaza and Marina		400 East Bay Street 30°19′29″N 81°39′09″W	260 (79.3)	23	2002	Residential	
16	233 West Duval		233 West Duval Street 30°19′49″N 81°39′38″W	260 (79.2)	18	1955	Office	Completed in 1955 for the Independent Life and Accident Insurance Company. JEA purchased and moved into the building in 1976, but vacated it in 1999.
17	CSX Transportation Building		500 Water Street 30°19′28″N 81°39′51″W	251 (76.5)	17	1960	Office	Built as the headquarters for the Atlantic Coast Line Railroad. Current headquarters of CSX Corporation.
18	San Marco Place		1300 Riverplace Boulevard 30°19′04″N 81°39′19″W	247 (75) (Note: Sources do not state the exact height of this building. This figure was determined using Google Earth by subtracting the altitude of the building's lowest main pedestrian open-air entrance from its highest architectural point.)	21	2006	Residential	
19	Baptist Medical Pavilion		800 Prudential Drive 30°18′57″N 81°39′45″W	238 (73)	18	1986	Office	Part of the Baptist Health faith-based health system.
20	Barnett National Bank Building		112 West Adams Street 30°19′40″N 81°39′33″W	224 (68.3)	18	1926	Mixed-use	Tallest building in Jacksonville from 1926 to 1954. Tallest building in Jacksonville completed in the 1920s. The building fell into disrepair in the 1990s. In 2017, it was renovated as a mixed-use office, residential, and educational building.
21	11 East Forsyth		11 East Forsyth Street 30°19′38″N 81°39′27″W	220 (67)	17	1926	Residential	Built as the Lynch Building. Also formerly known as the American Heritage Life Insurance Building. Originally an office building, it was converted to apartments in 2003.
22	Hyatt Regency Jacksonville		225 Coast Line Drive East 30°19′27″N 81°39′20″W	217 (66)	19	1999	Hotel	Formerly known as the Adams Mark Hotel. Chartres Lodging Group purchased the hotel in 2005 and rebranded it under the Hyatt Regency flag. Tallest hotel building in Jacksonville.
23	FIS World Headquarters	–	323 Riverside Avenue 30°19′14″N 81°40′21″W	212 (64.6)	12	2023	Office	Tallest building in Jacksonville completed in the 2020s.

== Tallest under construction or proposed ==
=== Under construction ===
As of 2026, there are no buildings under construction in Jacksonville that are planned to be at least 200 ft (61 m) tall.

=== Proposed ===
The following table includes approved and proposed buildings in Jacksonville that are expected to be at least 200 ft (61 m) tall as of 2026, based on standard height measurement. The “Year” column indicates the expected year of completion. A dash “–“ indicates information about the building’s height, floor count, or year of completion is unknown or has not been released.

Name	Height ft (m)	Floors	Year	Purpose	Status	Notes
111 Riverside Ave	–	32	–	Residential	Proposed	Proposed in 2026.
River City Brewing Co	–	25	–	Residential	Approved	

== Timeline of tallest buildings ==
This is a list of buildings that were the once the tallest in Jacksonville at the time of completion.

Name	Image	Years as tallest	Height ft (m)	Floors	Notes
Dyal-Upchurch Building		1902–1909	82 (25)	6	Built after the Great Fire of 1901. The tallest building in Florida until 1909.
121 Atlantic Place		1909–1912	135 (41)	10	The tallest building in Florida until 1912.
Florida Life Building		1912–1913	148 (45)	11	Part of the Laura Street Trio. The tallest building in Florida until 1913.
Heard National Bank Building		1913–1926	180 (55)	15	The tallest building in Florida until 1925. It is the only one of Jacksonville's and Florida's tallest buildings since 1902 to have been demolished. It was torn down in 1981; the Bank of America Tower now stands on the site.
Barnett National Bank Building		1926–1954	224 (68.3)	18	
Eight Forty One		1954–1967	309 (94.2)	22	Originally the Prudential Insurance Building.
Riverplace Tower		1967–1974	432 (131.7)	28	Tallest building in Florida until 1972.
1 Independent Square		1974–1990	535 (163.1)	37	Formerly known as the Independent Life Building and the Modis Building. Tallest building in Florida until 1981. The last of Florida's tallest buildings to be in Jacksonville.
Bank of America Tower		1990–present	617 (188.1)	42	Originally built as the Barnett Center.

== See also ==
- Architecture of Jacksonville
- List of tallest buildings in Florida
- List of tallest buildings in Fort Lauderdale
- List of tallest buildings in Miami
- List of tallest buildings in Miami Beach
- List of tallest buildings in Orlando
- List of tallest buildings in St. Petersburg
- List of tallest buildings in Sunny Isles Beach
- List of tallest buildings in Tampa
