= Bryan Simpson United States Courthouse =

United States Courthouse in Jacksonville, Florida

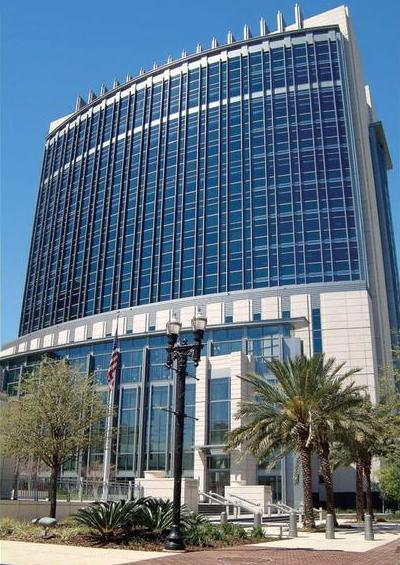

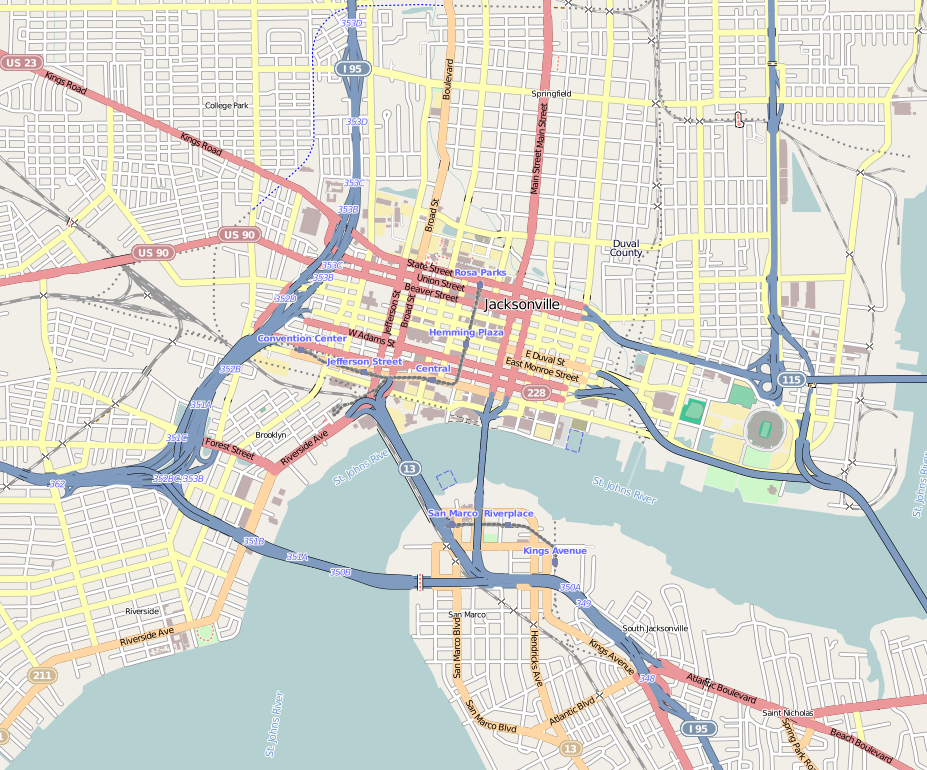
- Location within Central Jacksonville Location within Florida

General information
- Status: Completed
- Type: Judicial & Office
- Location: 300 North Hogan Street, Jacksonville, Florida, United States
- Coordinates: 30.32909°N 81.65997°W
- Construction started: 1999
- Completed: 2002
- Opening: 2003
- Cost: $84 million
- Owner: General Services Administration - Jacksonville

Height
- Roof: 277 feet (85 m)
- Top floor: 14

Technical details
- Floor count: 14
- Floor area: 457,000 sq ft (42,500 m^{2})

Design and construction
- Architects: HLM Design; KBJ Architects
- Main contractor: Skanska

The Bryan Simpson United States Courthouse is a courthouse and U.S. federal government facility in Jacksonville, Florida. It houses:

- The United States District Court for the Middle District of Florida, Jacksonville Division, and corresponding offices of the United States Bankruptcy Court for the Middle District of Florida and the United States Attorney for the Middle District of Florida.
- A satellite office of the United States Court of Appeals for the Eleventh Circuit.
- Offices for the United States Probation and Pretrial Services System, the United States Marshals Service, and the United States Trustee Program.

The courthouse was completed in late 2002 at a cost of $84 million and opened in early 2003. It replaced the old former courthouse, which was built in 1933 and had many indoor air quality problems, including illness-inducing mold and mildew.

The new courthouse comprises 492,000 square feet (45,700 m^{2}) over 14 floors, with a secure parking facility in the basement. It was named after John Milton Bryan Simpson, a federal judge who served in several positions in Florida, after passage of an act of Congress introduced by then U.S. Senator Bill Nelson. The courthouse was officially dedicated on August 11, 2008.

== See also ==
- List of tallest buildings in Jacksonville
