= One Enterprise Center =

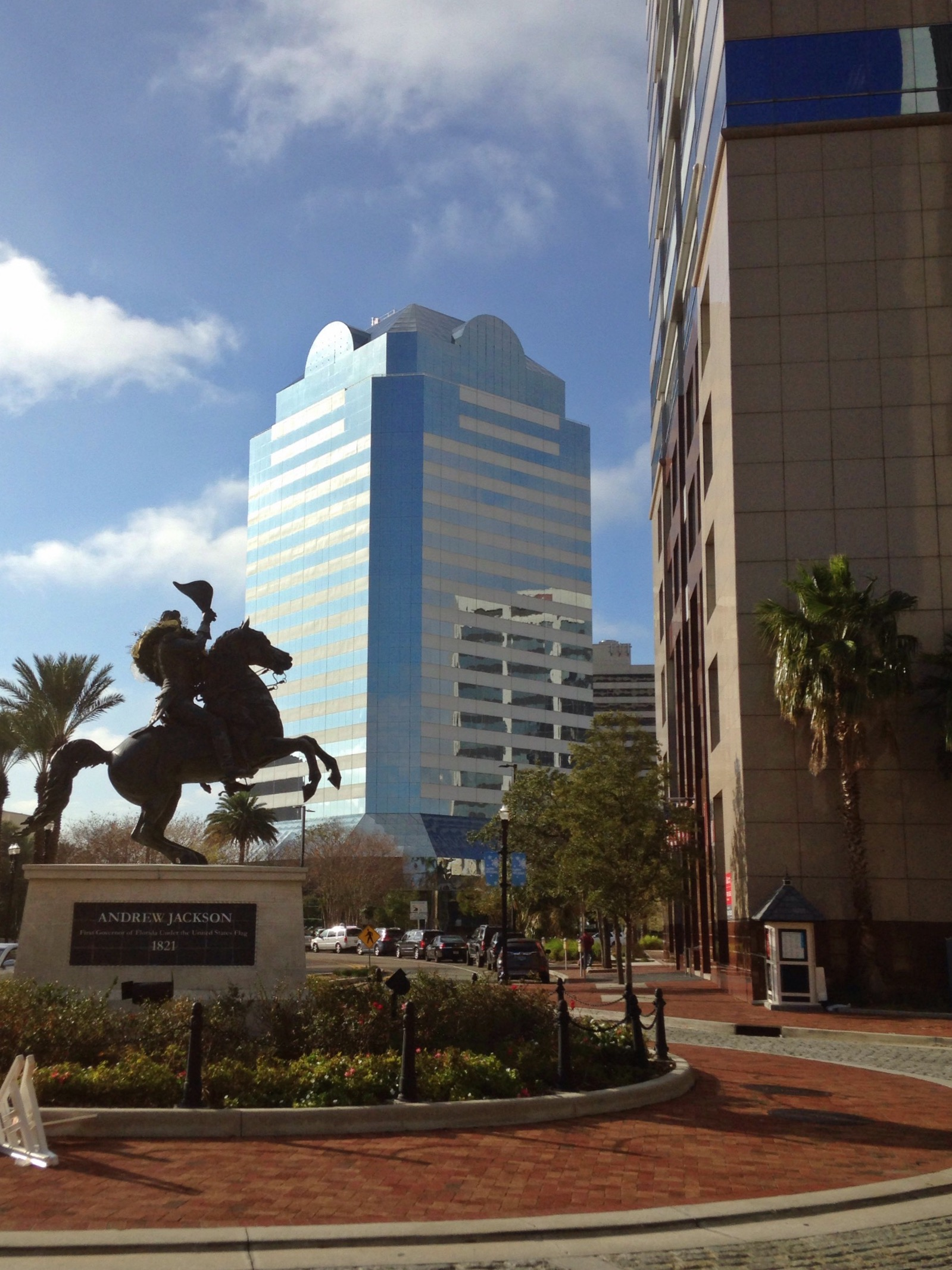

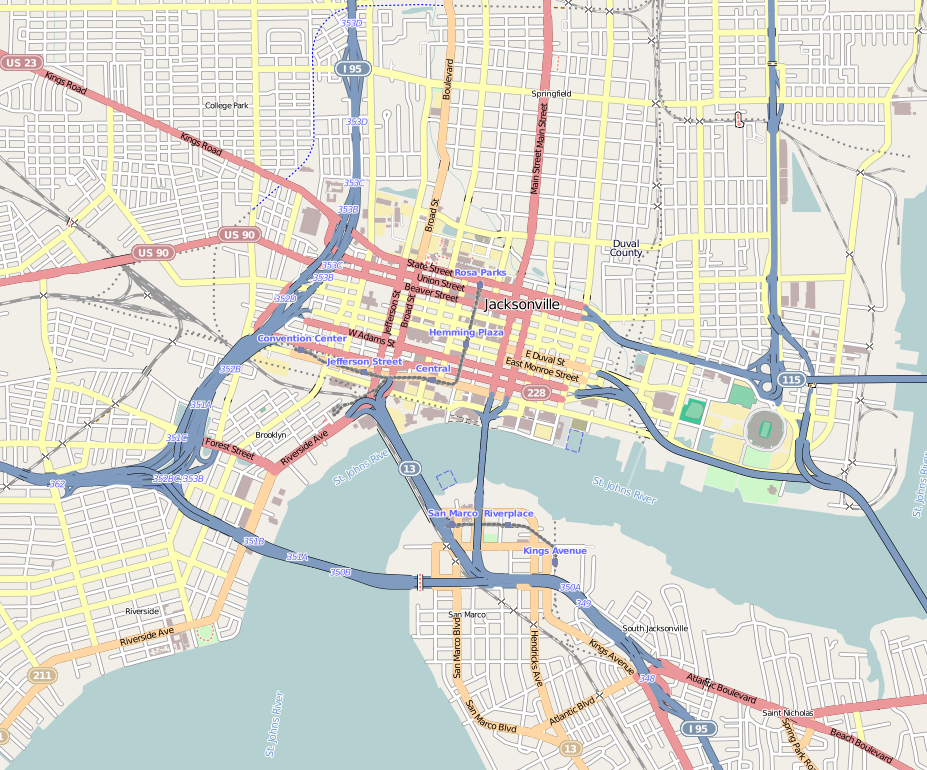
- Location within Central Jacksonville One Enterprise Center (Florida)
- Former names: Florida National Bank Building, First Union Bank Tower, Wachovia Bank Tower, Wells Fargo Tower

General information
- Type: Commercial Office
- Location: 225 Water Street; Jacksonville, Florida
- Coordinates: 30.32568°N 81.66155°W
- Completed: 1986

Height
- Roof: 299.00 ft (91.14 m)

Technical details
- Floor count: 21
- Floor area: 317,577 sq ft (29,503.9 m^{2})

Design and construction
- Architects: Clark Tribble Harris & Li Architects

One Enterprise Center is a 299.00 ft (91.14 m) skyscraper in Jacksonville, Florida. Located in the Northbank area of Downtown, tenants include Rayonier and CBRE Group. The building also shares a lobby with an adjacent Omni Hotel. The 21-floor structure was designed by Clark Tribble Harris & Li Architects and completed in 1986.

== Gallery ==
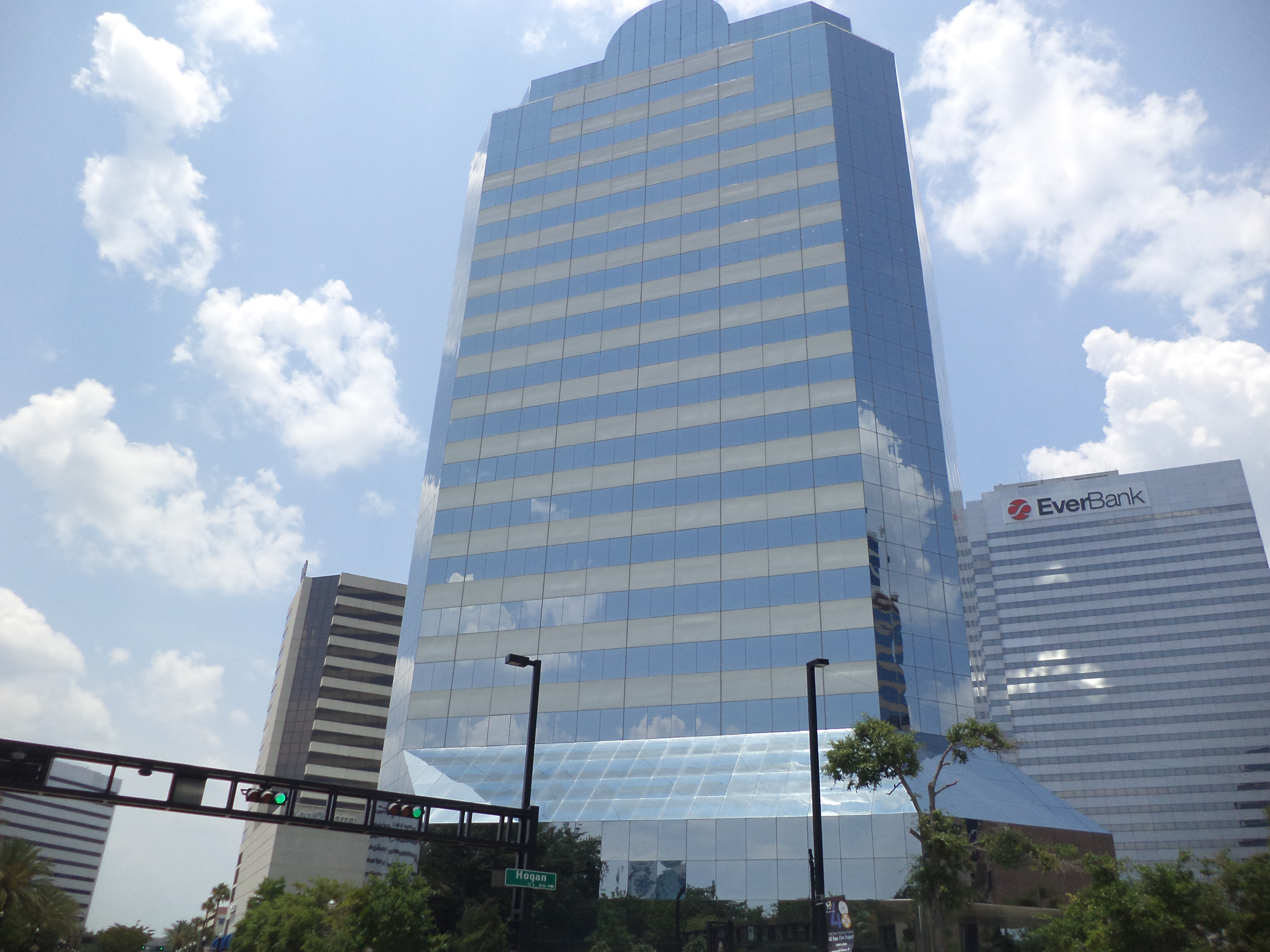

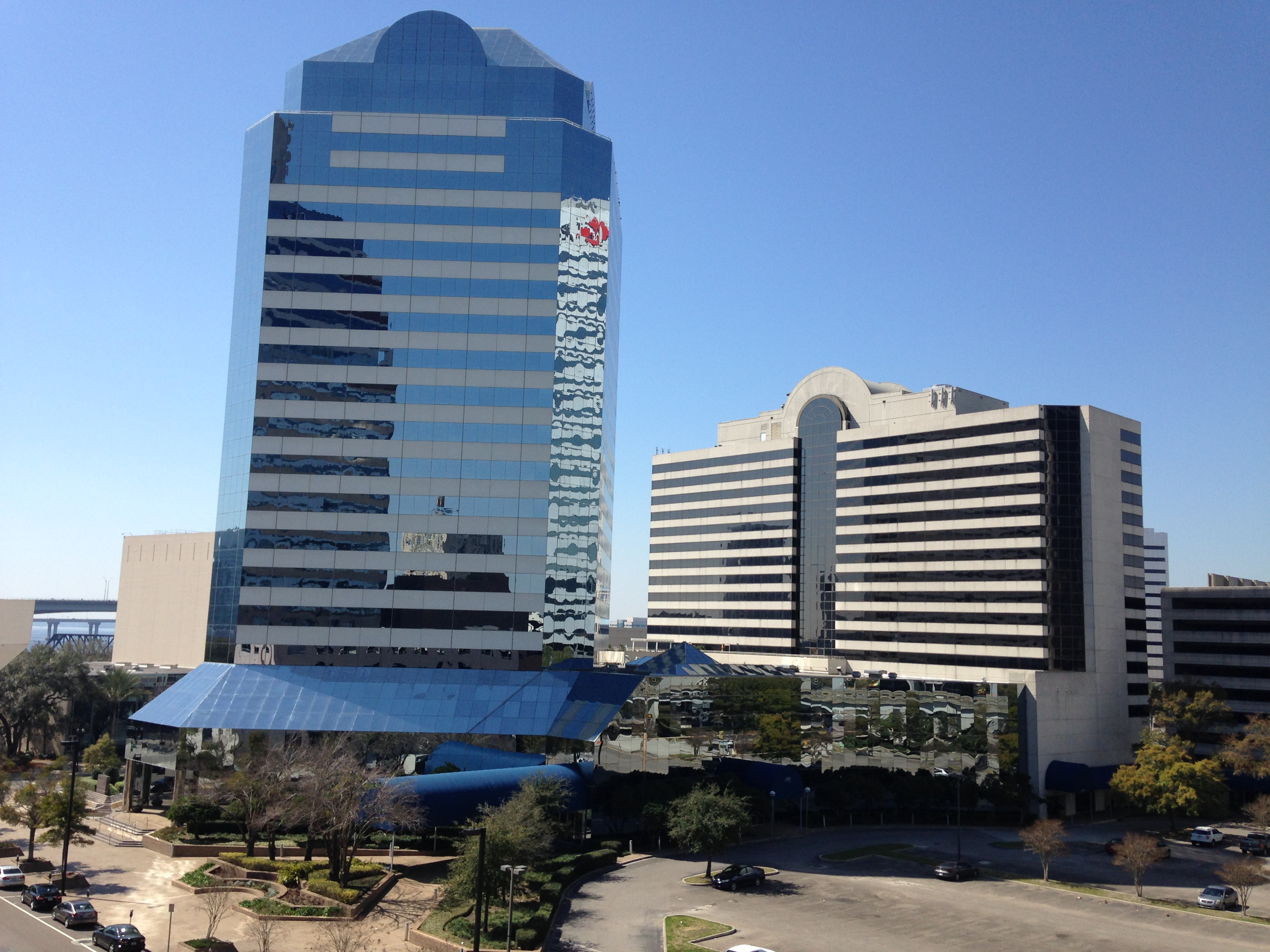

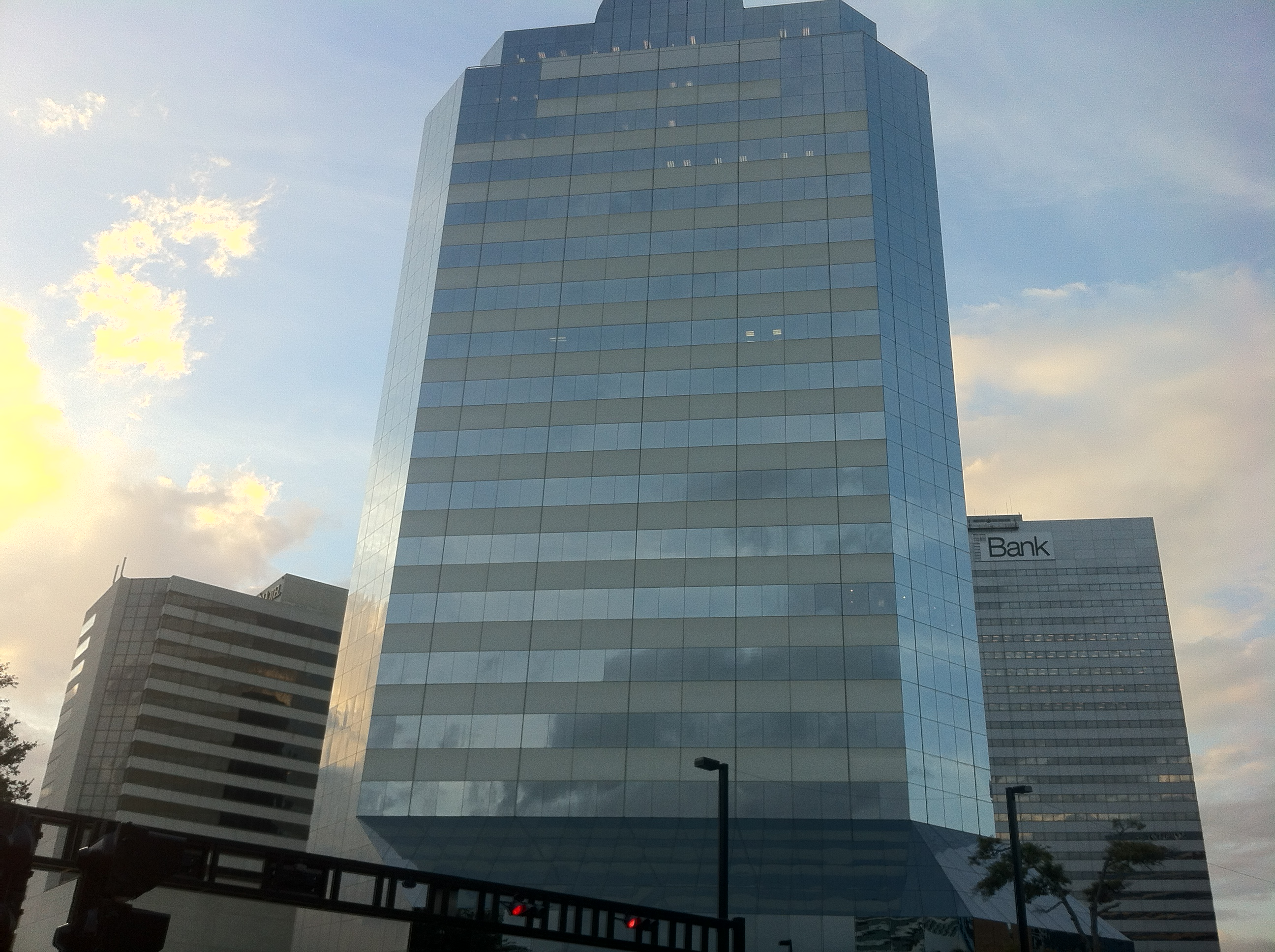

== See also ==
- Architecture of Jacksonville
- Downtown Jacksonville
- List of tallest buildings in Jacksonville
- List of tallest buildings in Florida
