= The Peninsula (Jacksonville, Florida) =

Coordinates: 30.3188°N 81.6548°W

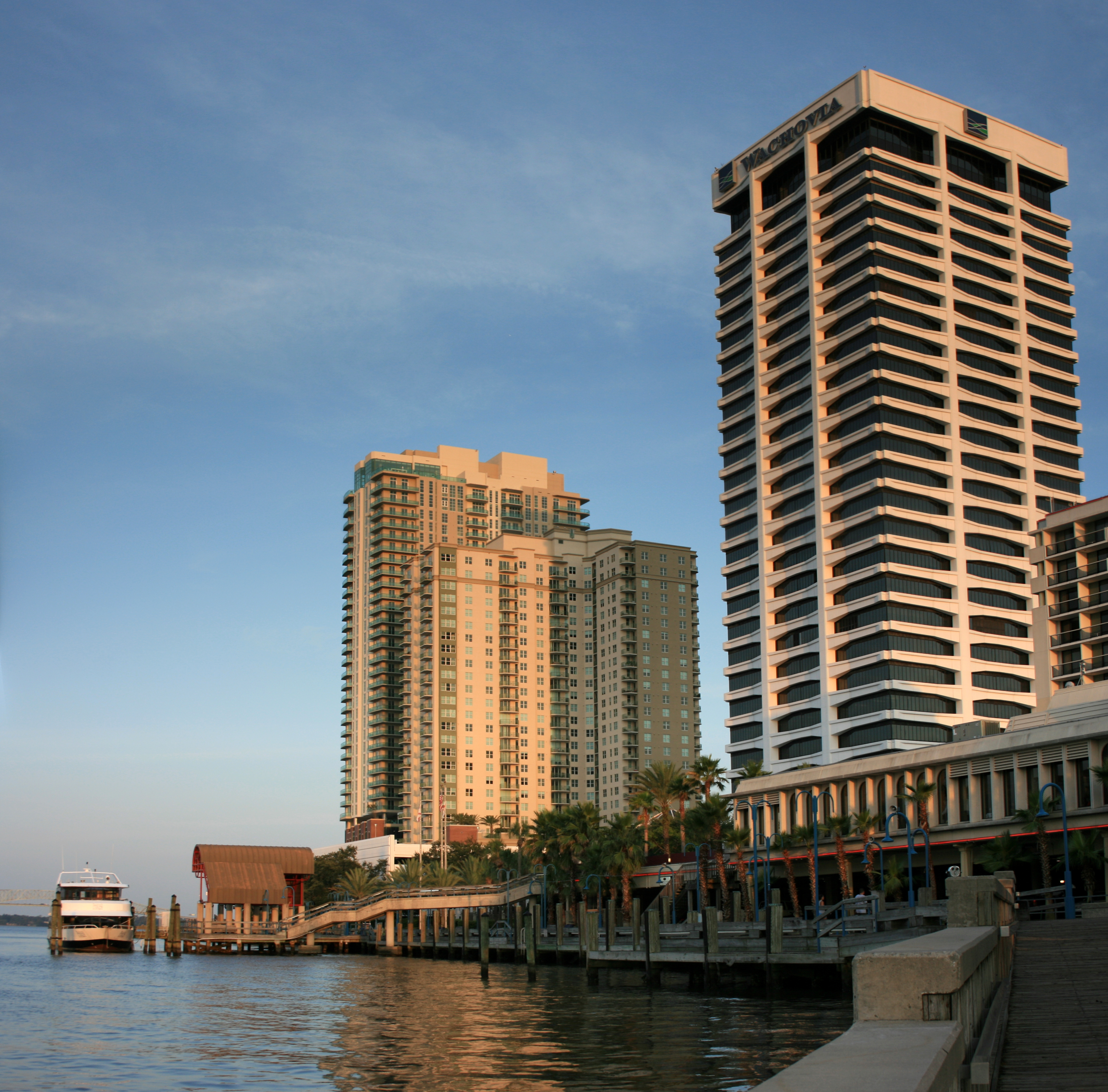
- The Peninsula can be seen as the building at the far left.
- Interactive map of the The Peninsula area

General information
- Status: Completed
- Type: Condominium
- Location: 1431 Riverplace Boulevard, Jacksonville, Florida, United States
- Completed: 2006
- Opening: 2008

Technical details
- Floor count: 36

The Peninsula is a condominium in Jacksonville, Florida, United States. It is the fourth tallest tower in Jacksonville at 437 feet. Groundbreaking was in 2006 and was completed in 2008. The Peninsula is located at 1431 Riverplace Boulevard.

== See also ==
- Downtown Jacksonville
- List of tallest buildings in Jacksonville
