= VyStar Tower =

Skyscraper in Jacksonville, Florida

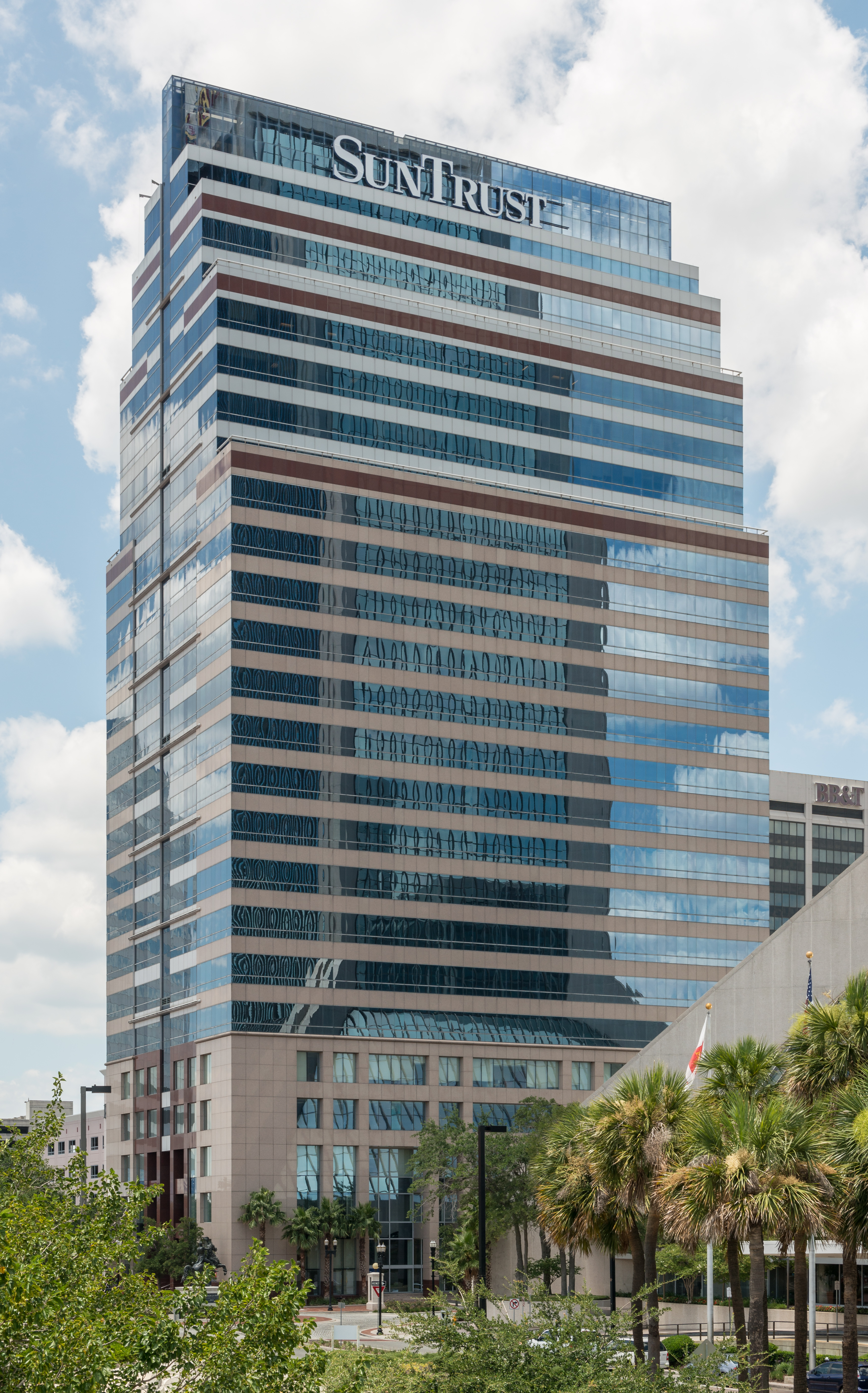
- VyStar Tower (previously Suntrust Tower) in 2016

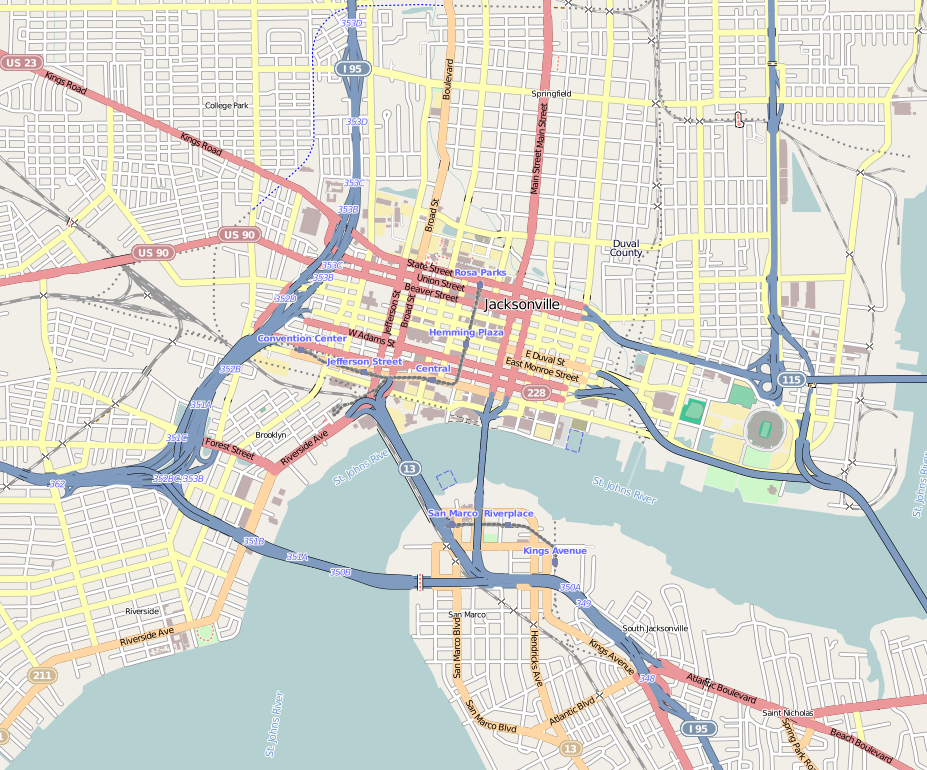
- Location within Central Jacksonville Location within Florida
- Former names: SunTrust Tower, Jacksonville Center, American Heritage Life Building, Humana Building

General information
- Type: Commercial offices
- Architectural style: Postmodern
- Location: 76 South Laura Street; Jacksonville, Florida, United States
- Coordinates: 30.32589°N 81.65990°W
- Completed: 1989
- Owner: Parador Group (Majority owner)

Height
- Roof: 357 ft (109 m)

Technical details
- Floor count: 24
- Floor area: 383,000 sq ft (35,580 m^{2})

Design and construction
- Architecture firm: KBJ Architects

VyStar Tower (originally American Heritage Life Building) is a skyscraper in the downtown area of Jacksonville, Florida, at the northwest corner of Independent Drive and Laura Street. Standing 357 feet (109 meters) tall, it is the city's sixth tallest building. It was formerly known as the SunTrust Tower, Jacksonville Center and the Humana Building, among other names. Completed in 1989, the building was designed in the postmodern style by the Jacksonville firm KBJ Architects.

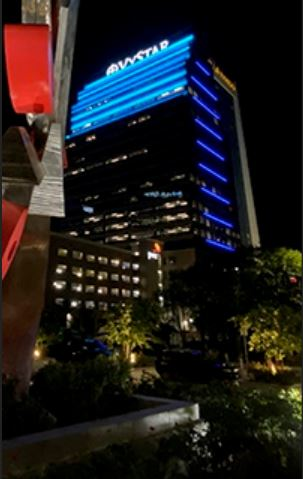
VyStar Tower in August 2020

In 2018, it was announced that VyStar Credit Union, the second largest credit union in Florida, and sixteenth largest in the country, was purchasing the building for its new headquarters. The deal was finalized in late 2019, after the lease of the former tenant, Suntrust, had expired.

VyStar completed construction of its sign atop the building in August 2019. On July 1, 2020, VyStar finished the installation of electric blue LED edge lighting on the top tiers of the tower to accompany the VyStar sign. The project was completed by local businesses Dana B. Kenyon Company, Miller Electric Company and RS&H and was part of a multi-phase initiative by the credit union to bolster its VyStar Campus, which includes the 100 W. Bay building next to the VyStar Tower.

The improvements made to the 100 W. Bay building include the addition of food and retail space. In March 2020, The Bread & Board, a local food concept that offers sandwiches, charcuterie and more, announced it planned to open its third location on the first floor of the VyStar Credit Union's downtown campus at 100 W. Bay St.

Including the VyStar Tower and the 100 W. Bay building, VyStar planned to move more than 1,000 employees to downtown Jacksonville.

== See also ==
- Downtown Jacksonville
- Architecture of Jacksonville
- List of tallest buildings in Jacksonville
- List of tallest buildings in Florida
