= CSX Transportation Building =

Office building in Jacksonville, Florida, US

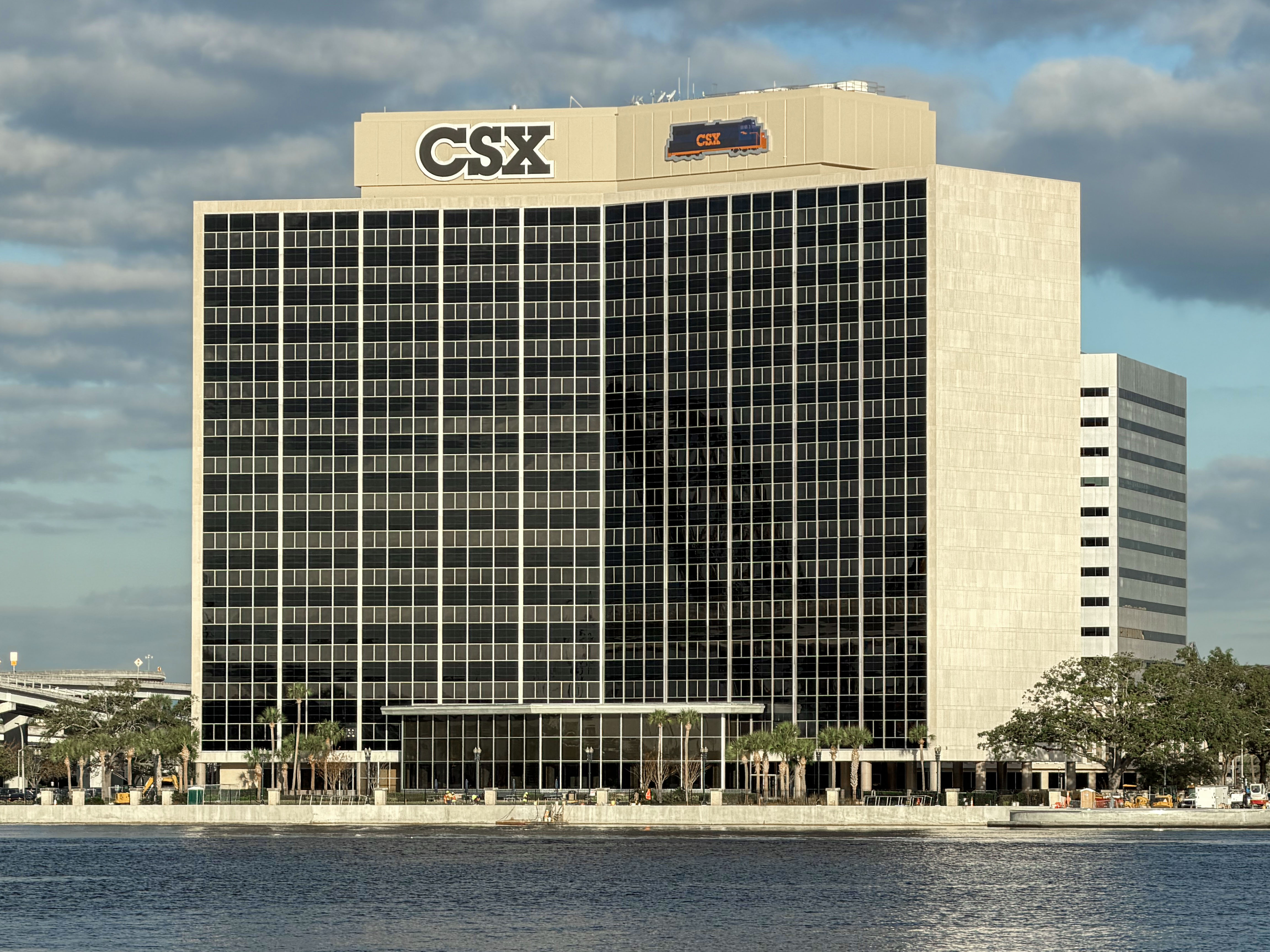
- The CSX Transportation Building in January 2026

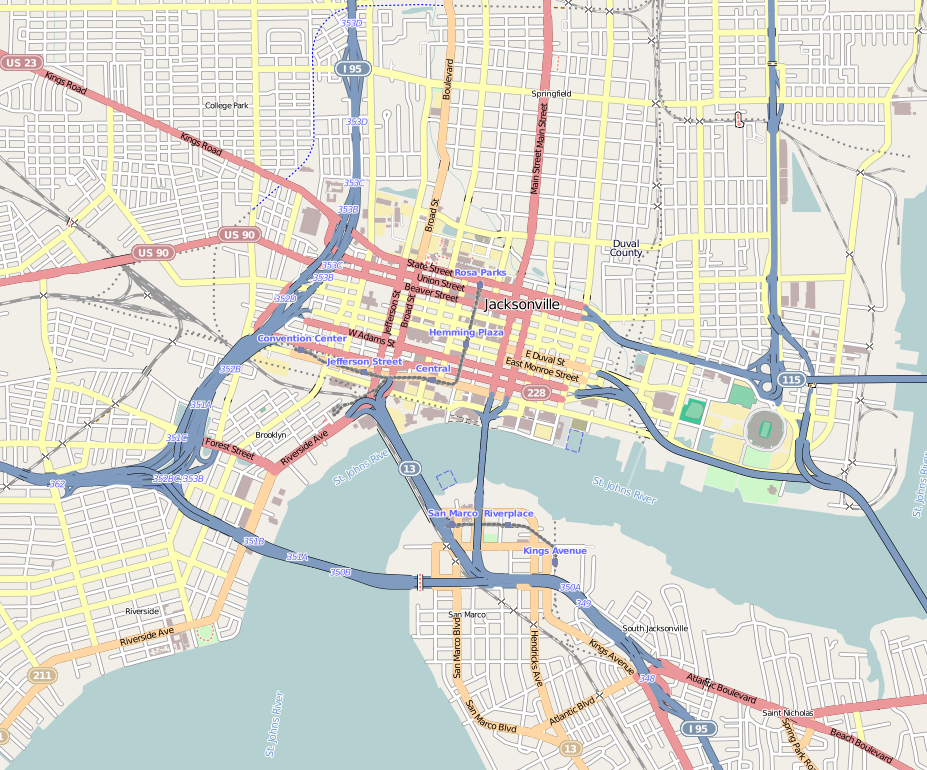
- Location within Central Jacksonville CSX Transportation Building (Florida)
- Former names: Atlantic Coast Line Building, Seaboard Coastline Railroad Building

General information
- Type: Commercial offices
- Architectural style: International Style; Mid-century modern
- Location: 500 Water Street; Jacksonville, Florida, U.S.
- Coordinates: 30.32442°N 81.663984°W
- Completed: 1960
- Owner: CSX Corporation

Height
- Roof: 251 ft (77 m)

Technical details
- Floor count: 17
- Floor area: 460,000 sq ft (42,740 m^{2})

Design and construction
- Architecture firm: KBJ Architects

Other information
- Public transit access: at Central

The CSX Transportation Building is a 251 feet (77 meters) high-rise office building located in Jacksonville, Florida. Completed in 1960, the building currently serves as headquarters for CSX Corporation. The building is located in the Northbank area of Downtown Jacksonville, along the banks of the St. Johns River.

The building was originally built as the headquarters for the Atlantic Coast Line Railroad. In 1956, the railroad company decided to move its corporate headquarters from Wilmington, North Carolina to Jacksonville, which was the winning candidate of three southern cities; the other two were Savannah, Georgia and Charleston, South Carolina. From July 1960 to July 1, 1967, the building was used by the ACL; from July 1, 1967 to January 1, 1983, by the Seaboard Coast Line Railroad (a company created by the merger of the Seaboard Air Line Railroad and the ACL), and from January 1, 1983 to the present by the Seaboard System Railroad, renamed CSX Transportation on July 1, 1986.

Its former names include Atlantic Coast Line Railroad Building, Seaboard Coastline Railroad Building, and Seaboard System Railroad Building. Designed by lead architect Bob Lee of KBJ Architects, the CSX Transportation Building is a LEED certified building and is an example of Mid-century modern and International style architecture.

== Gallery ==
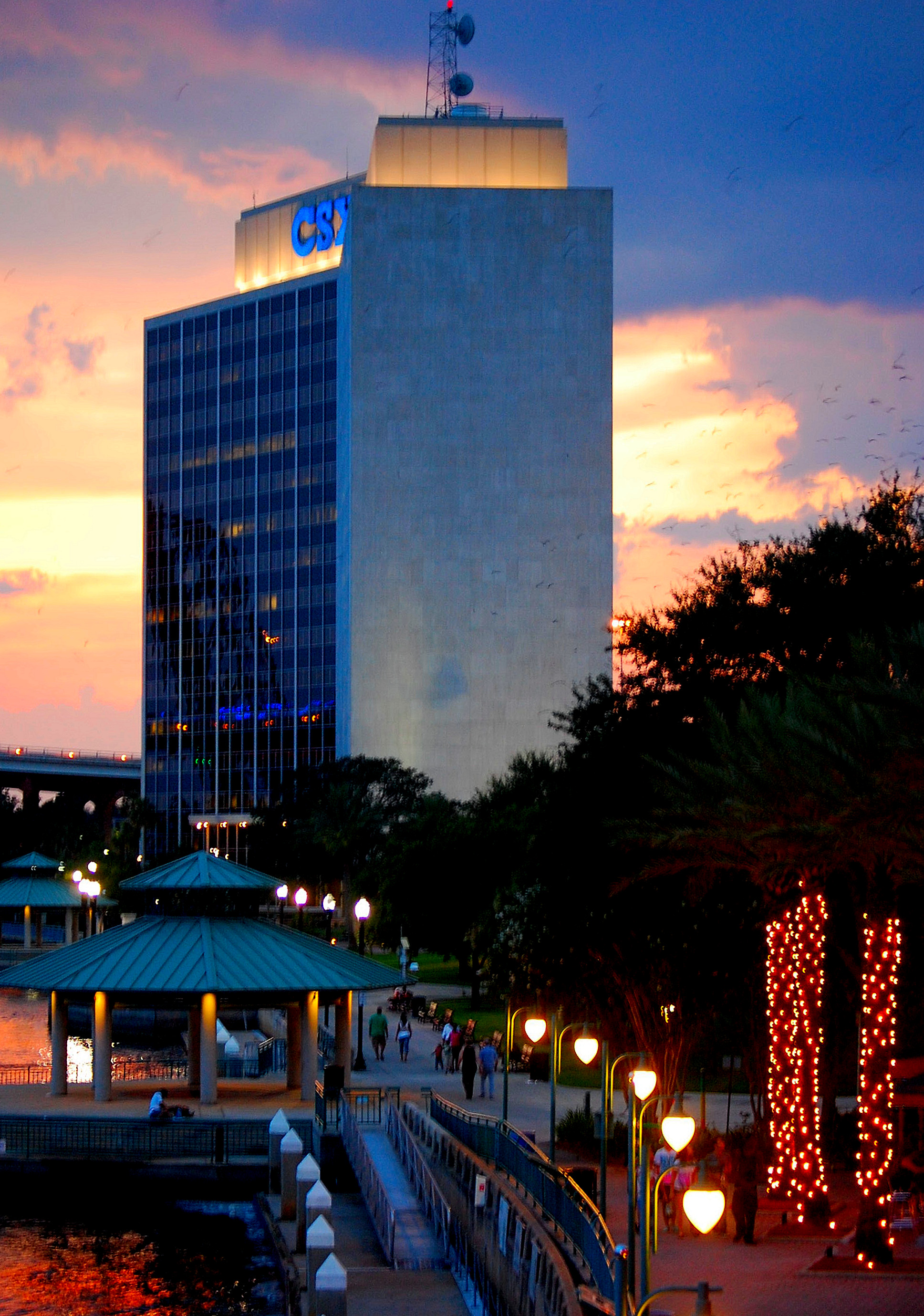

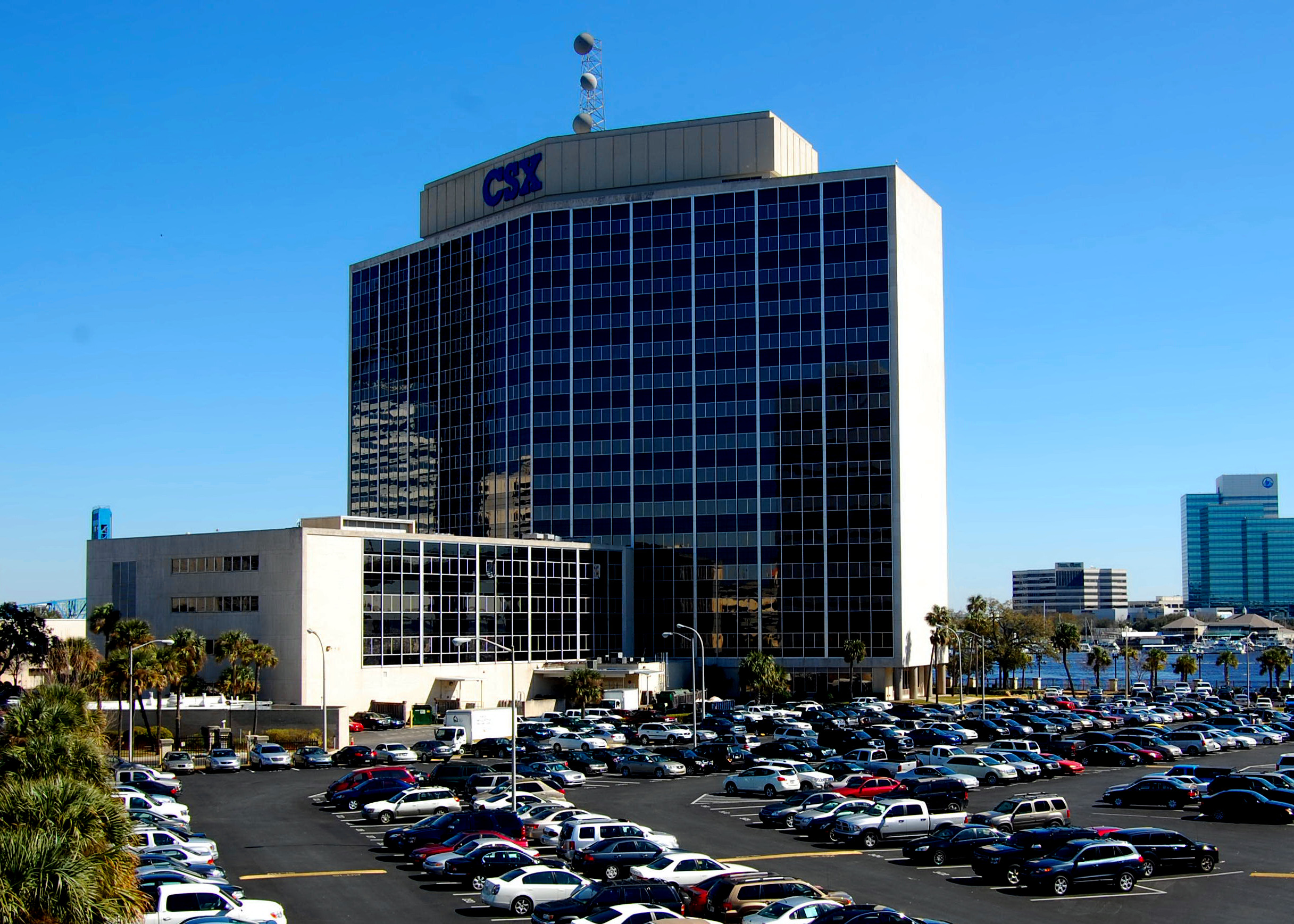

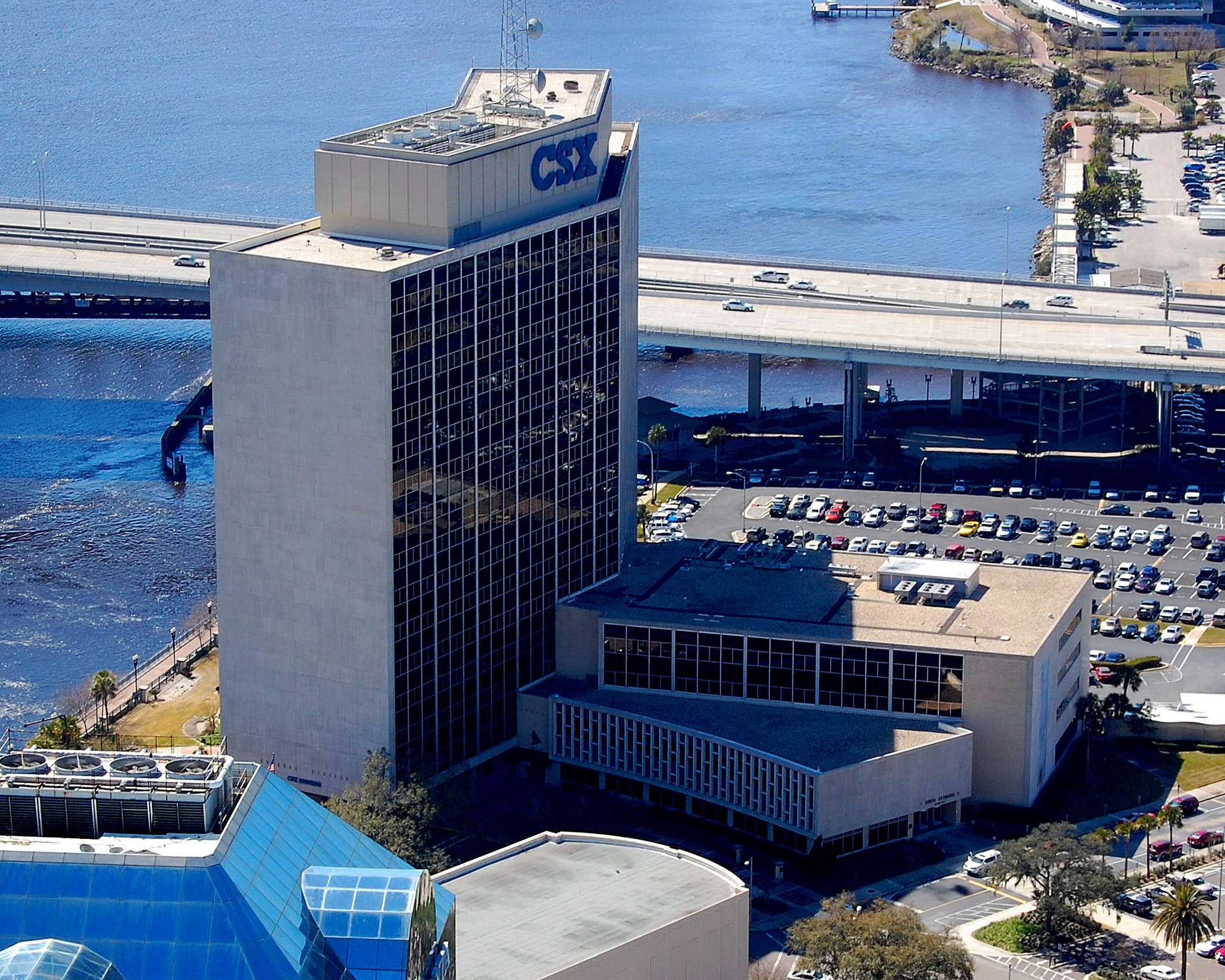

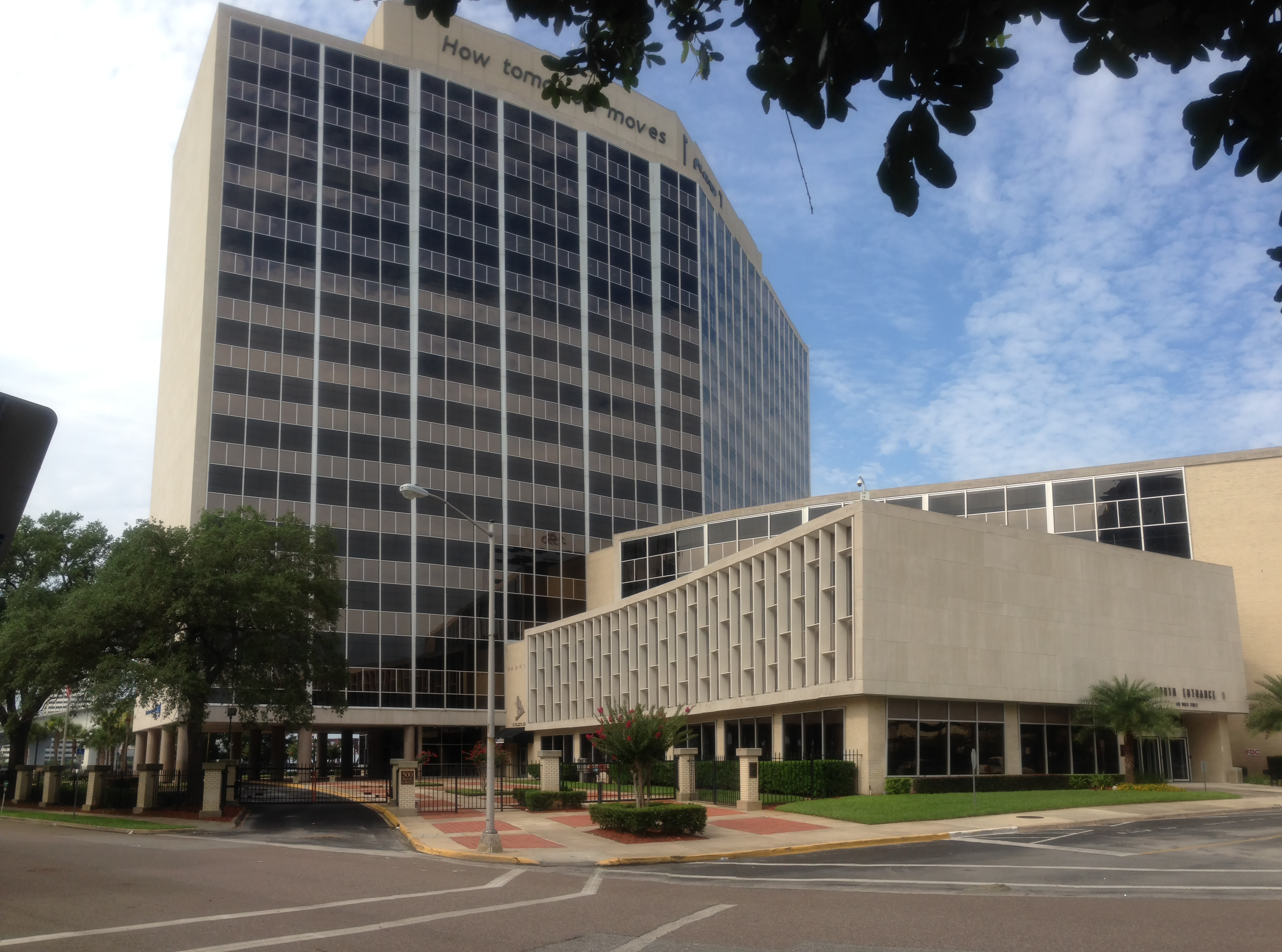

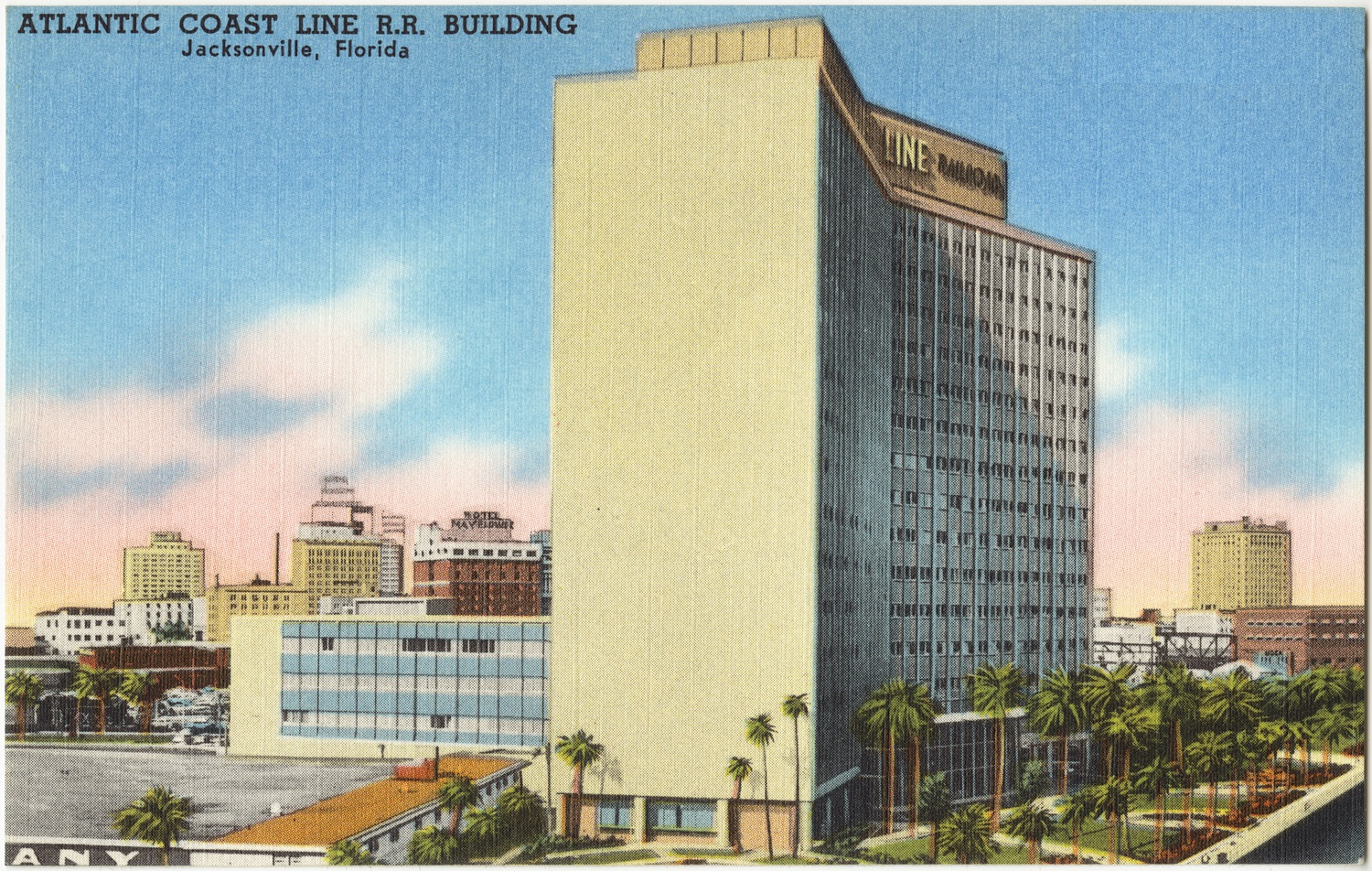

== See also ==
- Architecture of Jacksonville
- List of tallest buildings in Jacksonville
- Downtown Jacksonville
