= Bank of America Tower (Jacksonville) =

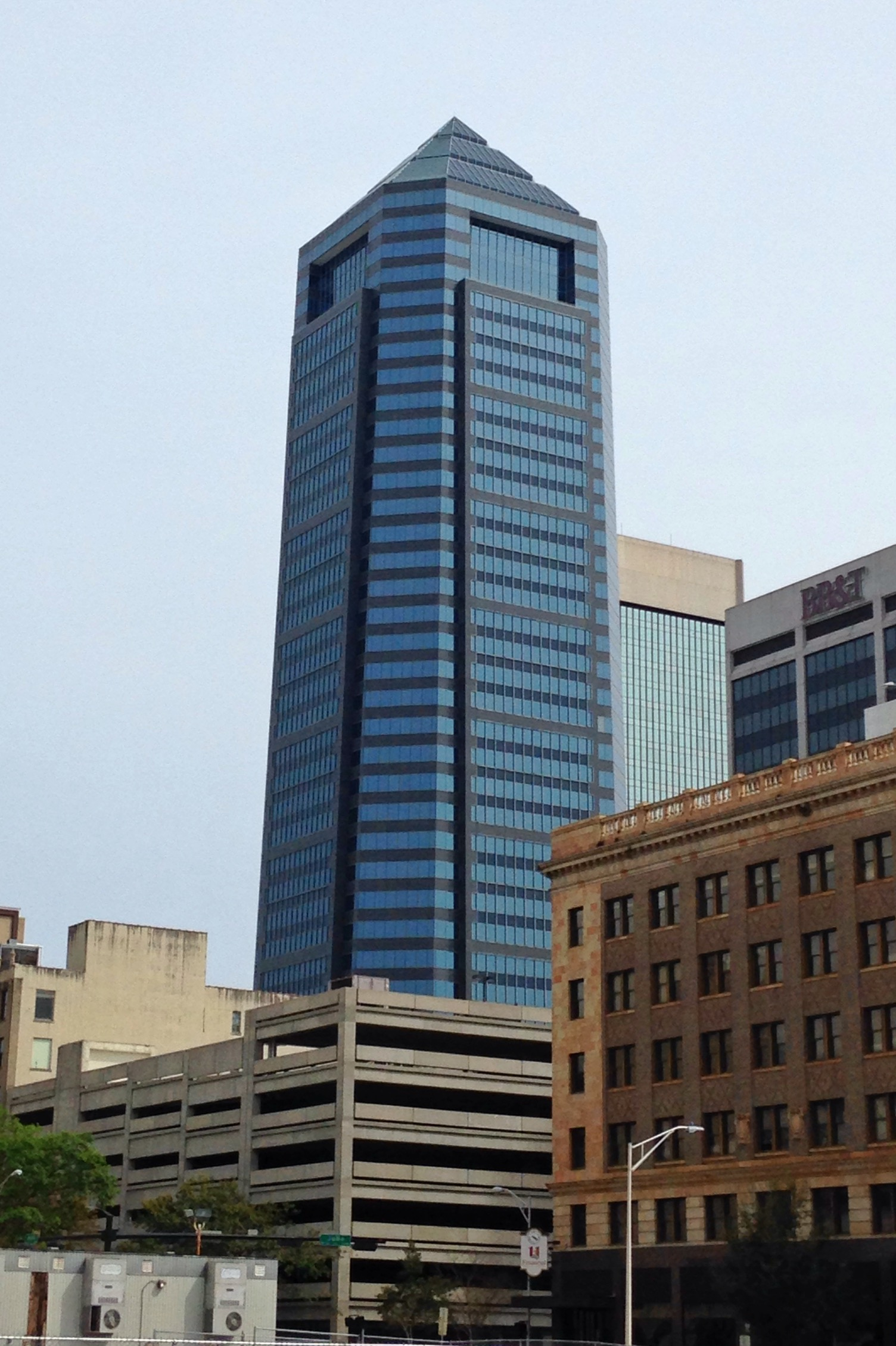

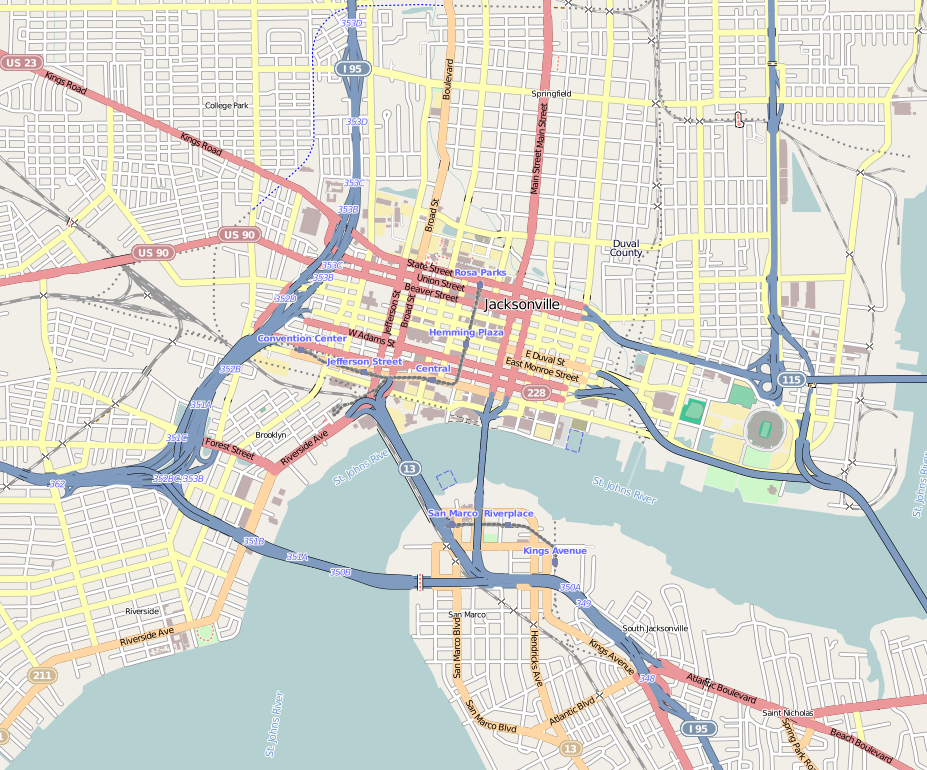
- Location within Central Jacksonville Bank of America Tower (Jacksonville) (Florida)
- Former names: Barnett Center; Nationsbank Tower

General information
- Type: Commercial office
- Architectural style: Postmodern
- Location: 50 North Laura Street; Jacksonville, Florida
- Coordinates: 30.32691°N 81.65962°W
- Completed: 1990
- Owner: Group RMC
- Operator: CBRE

Height
- Roof: 189.06 m (620.3 ft)

Technical details
- Floor count: 42
- Floor area: 698,000 sq ft (64,800 m^{2})
- Lifts/elevators: 19

Design and construction
- Architects: Murphy/Jahn, Inc. Architects

Bank of America Tower (originally Barnett Center) is a skyscraper in the downtown area of Jacksonville, Florida, at the northwest corner of Bay and Laura streets. At 617 ft (188 m), it is the tallest building in Jacksonville, the 25th-tallest in Florida, and the tallest building in Florida outside of the Miami metropolitan area. It was built in 1990 as the headquarters of Barnett Bank and originally named Barnett Center, but the name was changed to NationsBank Tower in 1998 after Barnett Bank was acquired by NationsBank. NationsBank was soon acquired by Bank of America and the building's name was changed to Bank of America Tower in 1999. The 42-floor structure was designed by German-American architect Helmut Jahn, and is constructed of reinforced concrete. It was built on the site of the Heard National Bank Building, the former tallest structure in Florida for twelve years. In 2020, Group RMC purchased the property from Hertz Investment Group.

== Gallery ==
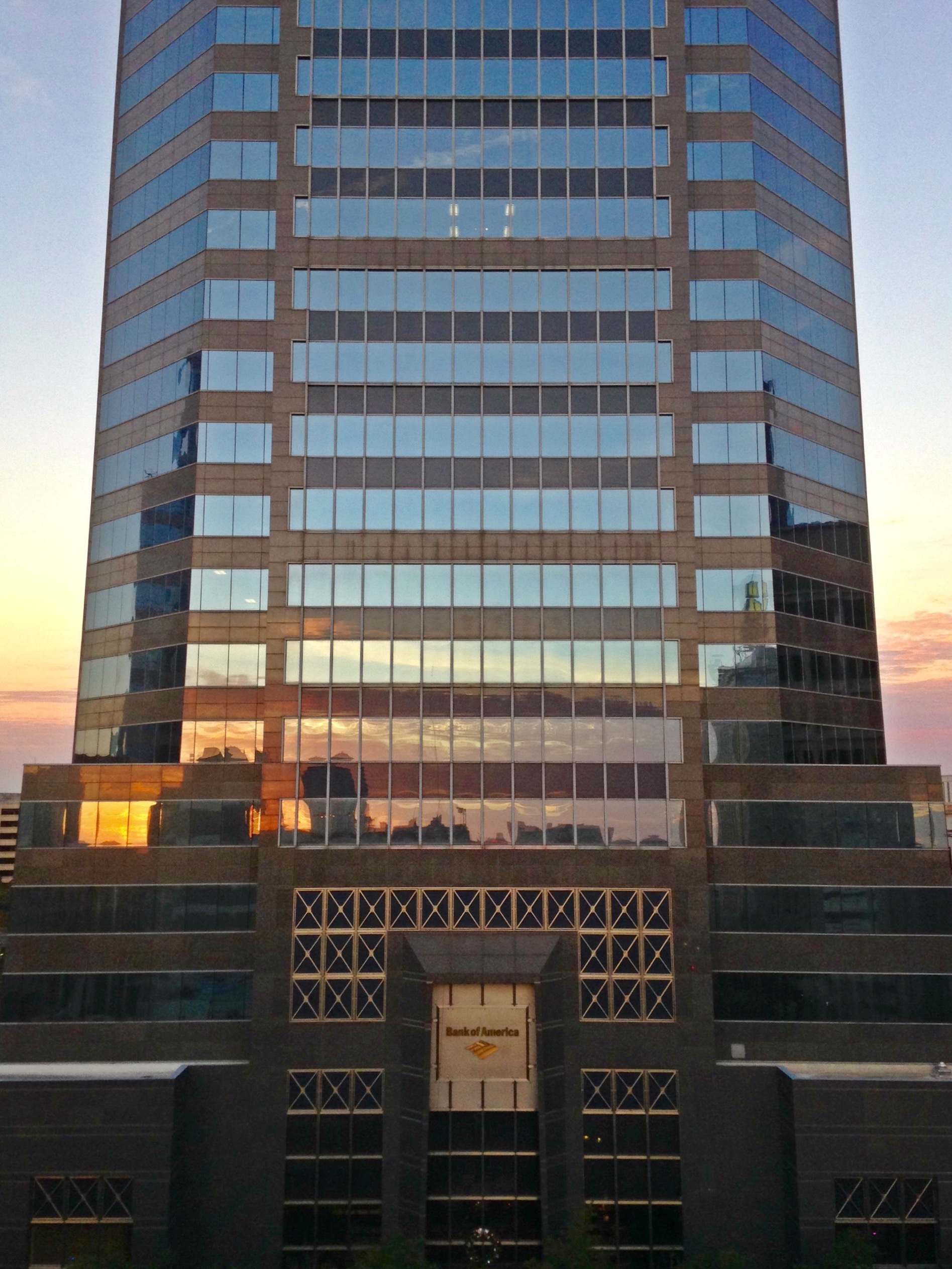
Entrance to the tower

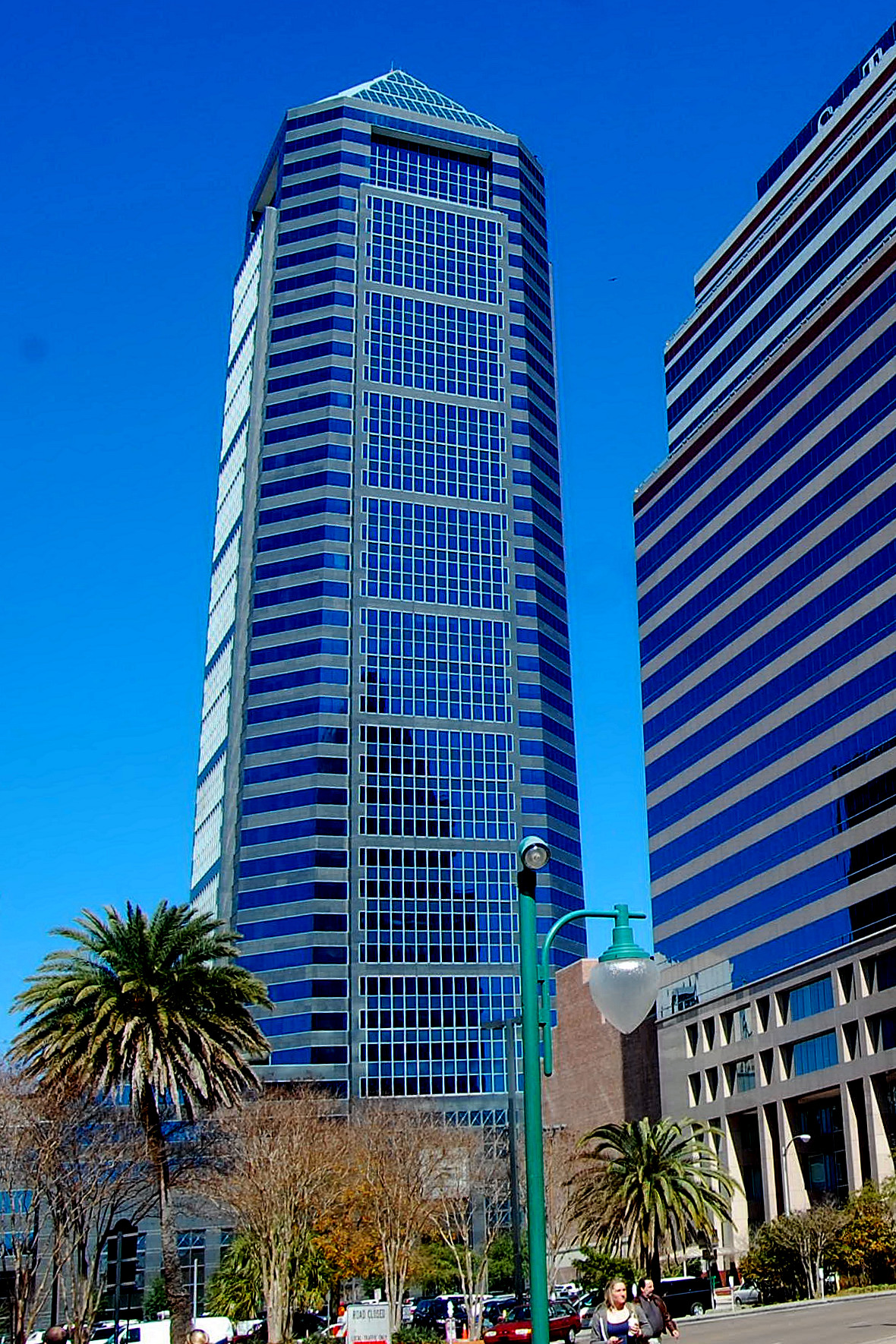
View of the tower in 2010

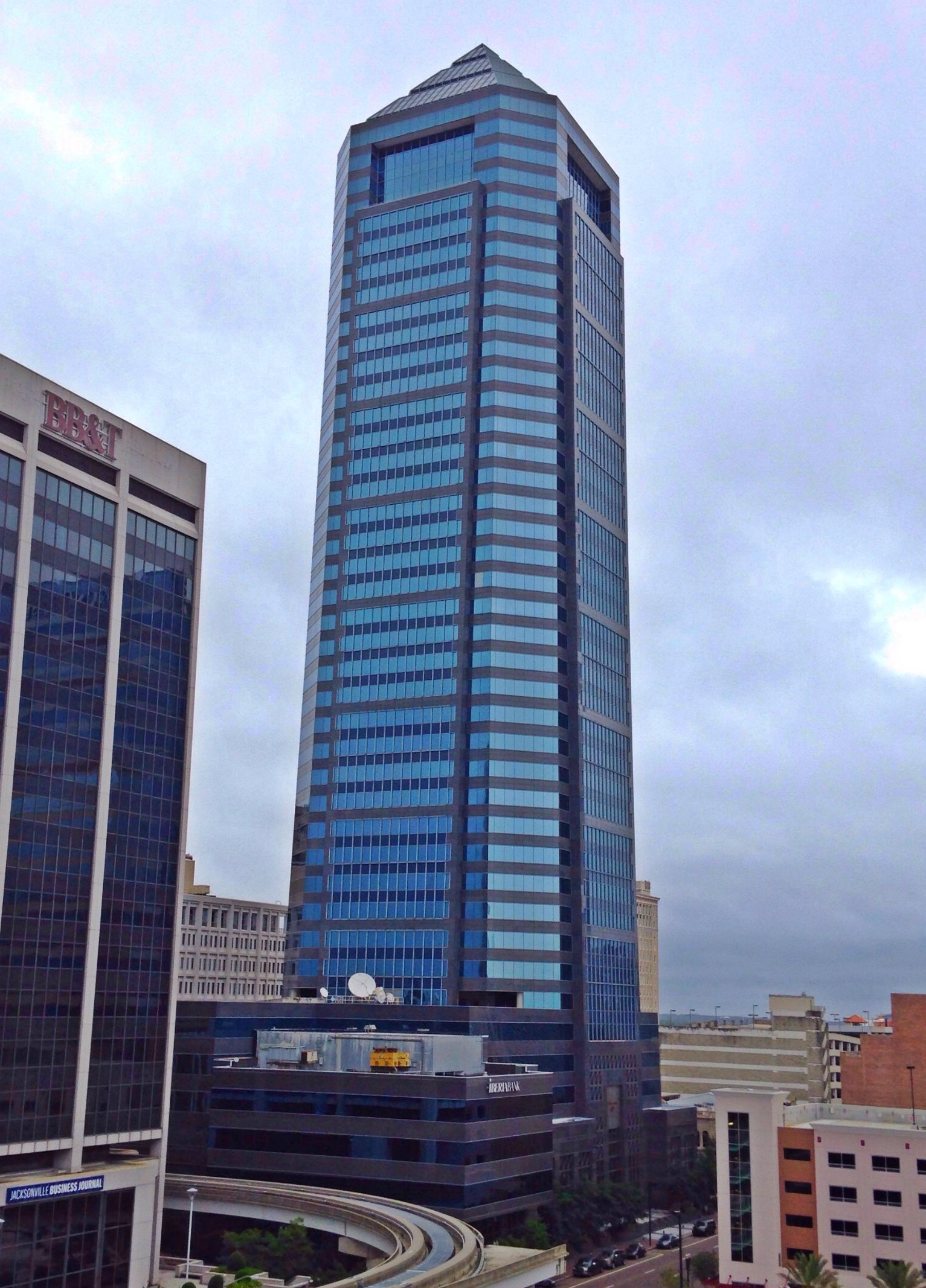

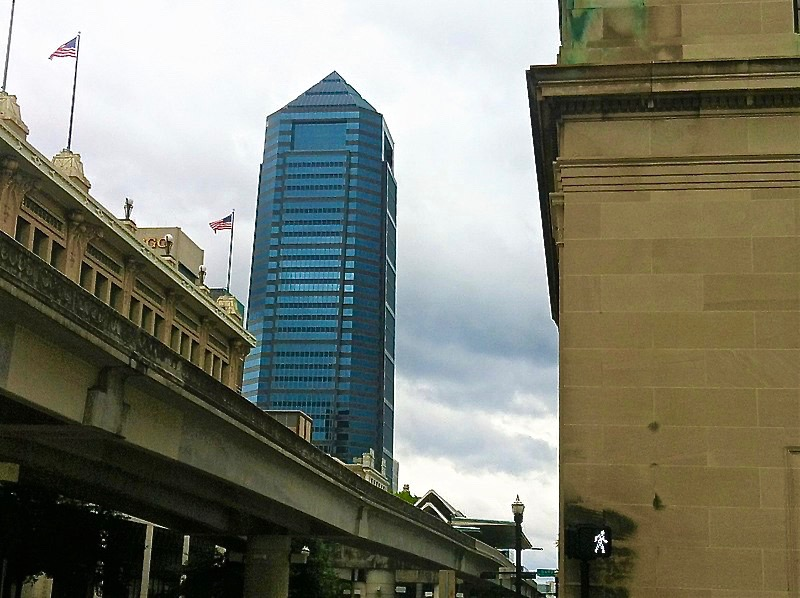
View from Hogan and Church Streets

== See also ==
- Architecture of Jacksonville
- List of tallest buildings in Jacksonville
- Bank of America Plaza (Tampa)

Records
Preceded by Wells Fargo Center	Tallest Building in Jacksonville; 1990—Present; 188m	Succeeded by None
