= JEA Tower =

Skyscraper in Jacksonville, Florida

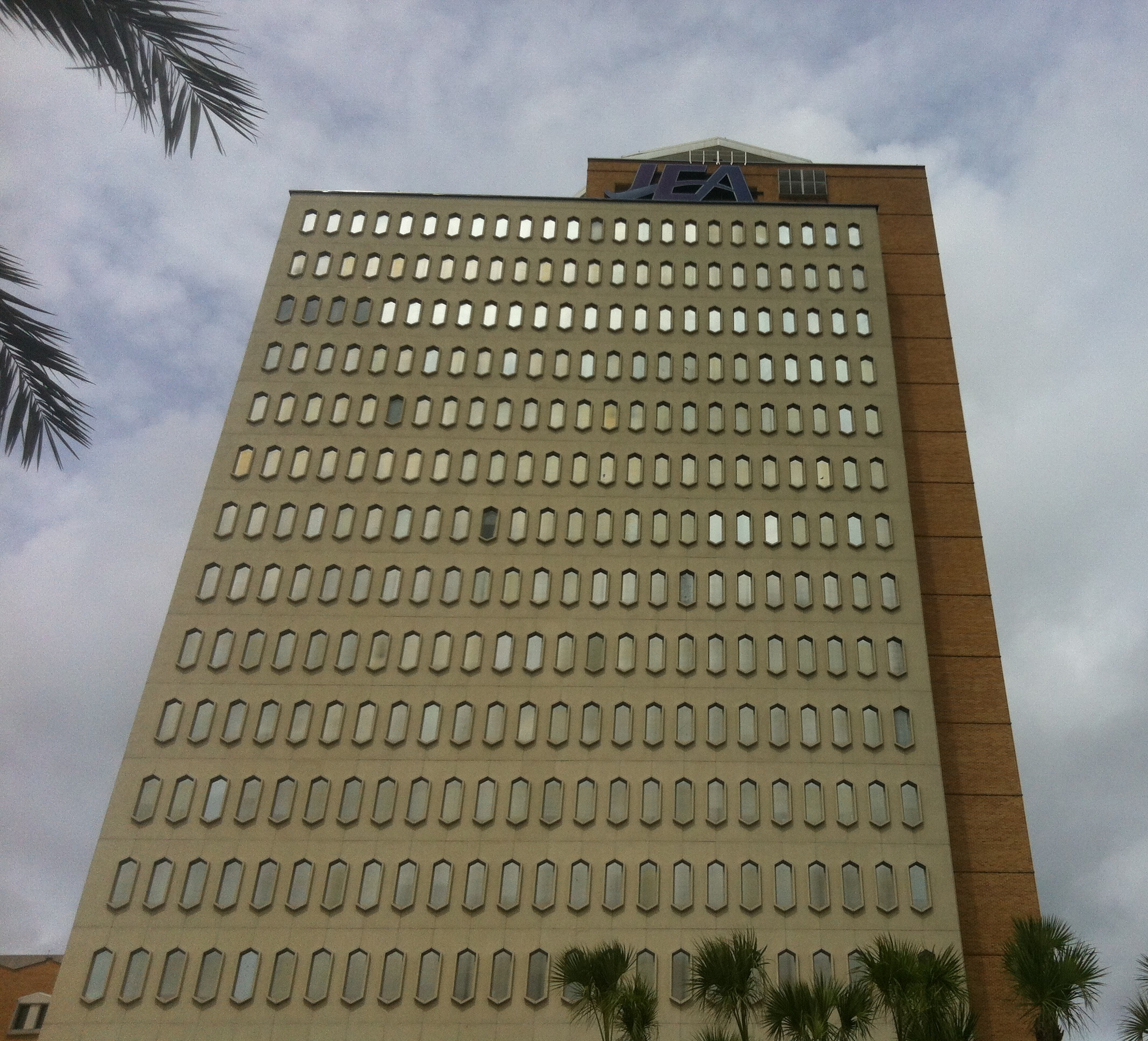

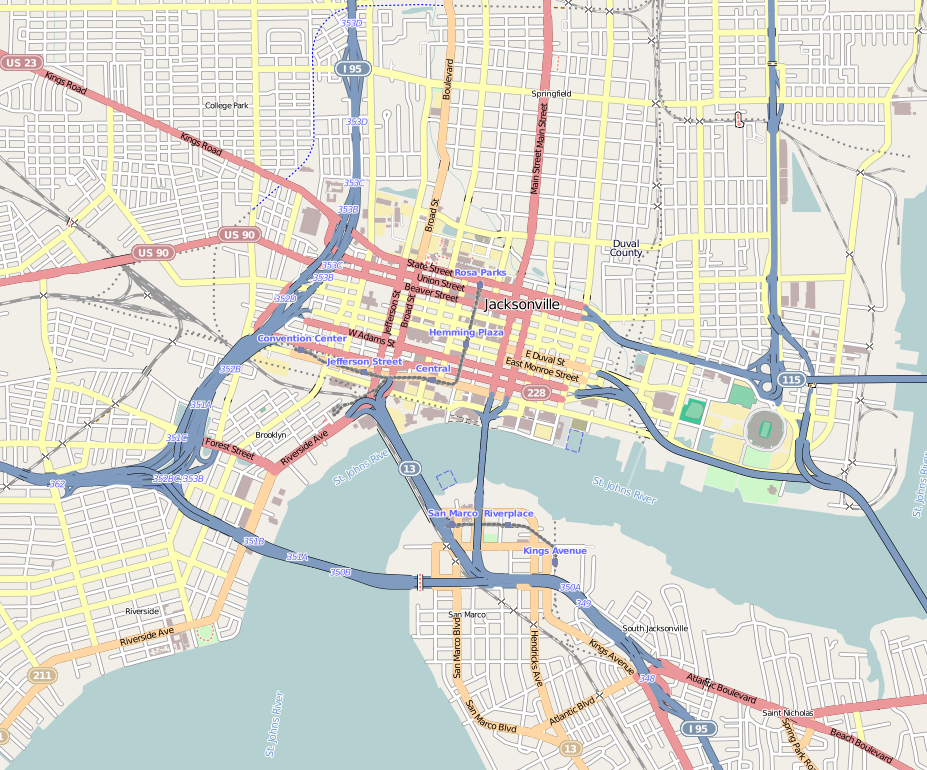
- Location within Central Jacksonville Location within Florida
- Former names: Universal-Marion Building

General information
- Type: Class "B" office
- Architectural style: Mid-century modern
- Location: 21 West Church Street, Jacksonville, Florida, United States
- Coordinates: 30.32754°N 81.66222°W
- Construction started: 1962; 64 years ago
- Completed: 1963; 63 years ago
- Opening: 1963; 63 years ago
- Owner: JEA

Height
- Roof: 268 ft (82 m)

Technical details
- Floor count: 19
- Floor area: 347,811 sq ft (32,312.7 m^{2})
- Lifts/elevators: 2
- Grounds: 2.47 acres

Design and construction
- Architect: Morris Ketchum Jr.

JEA Tower is a skyscraper in Jacksonville, Florida, owned by JEA. Standing 268 ft (82 m) tall, it ranked second on the list of tallest buildings in Jacksonville when built. Until 1988 it was known as the Universal-Marion Building.

== Downtown Center ==
The Downtown Center was a collection of buildings in Jacksonville consisting of the Park South building, the J.B. Ivey & Company building and the Universal-Marion building, all connected by open courtyards. Park South was a 5-level parking garage with Purcells, a store for women on the ground floor. Iveys was a department store with 6 floors and an underground parking garage. Universal-Marion was a 19-story office building with a circular revolving restaurant on the 18th floor. The buildings were all designed by noted New York architect Morris Ketchum Jr. in the Mid-century modern architectural style.

=== Universal-Marion ===
This building opened in 1963 as the headquarters for Louis Wolfson's Universal-Marion Company when the firm was the largest tenant. The company owned the Miami Beach Sun (1929–1971) and the Jacksonville Chronicle newspapers and made movies through a subsidiary. The firm co-financed the production of The Producers, Mel Brooks' first movie, which won an Oscar and later became a major Broadway play. At its peak, Wolfson's empire had total assets estimated at $250 million, worth $2 billion in 2025 dollars.

==== Restaurant ====
The eighteenth floor of the building hosted a restaurant with seating for 250 named, the Embers. It began serving in 1964 and featured a rotating view of the city. A few southern skyscrapers were built with revolving floors following the World's Fair in Seattle, Washington where the Space Needle had a revolving restaurant on the top floor. Every Friday, live lobsters arrived from Booth Bay, Maine. The restaurant completed a full rotation every 90 minutes. However, maintenance was expensive and the novelty wore off after a dozen years. After it closed, it became Charter's CEO Raymond Knight Mason's office, then the boardroom for JEA's directors.

==== Charter ====
Raymond K. Mason and his Charter Company had their corporate headquarters there from 1979 to 1984.

=== Iveys ===
In August 1962 the J.B. Ivey & Company department store opened. Other nearby stores included May-Cohens, Furchgott's (closed in May 1985), Levy-Wolf (closed in 1984) Jacobsons, JCPenney and Sears. Annual Downtown retail sales in 1963 were $94 million. By 1982 it had fallen to $92 million. In contrast, sales at Regency Square in Arlington went from $29 million (1967) to $319 million (1982). Sales growth had shifted from downtown to the suburbs. By the time Ivey's department store closed in July 1985, their top three floors were already empty.

=== Park South ===
Purcell's Women's Store opened first, in 1960. It fell prey to the same fate as Iveys and closed in the 1980s.

== JEA ==
JEA purchased the Downtown Center in 1988 for $8 million. It moved its corporate offices into the Universal-Marion building and renamed it the JEA Tower, placing its logo at the top. Its customer service department occupied the Iveys building. The company occupied the buildings until April, 2023 when the utility's current seven-story headquarters was completed at 225 N. Pearl St.

=== Future ===
In the 2010s, JEA had occupied the Downtown Center for 30 years. Through automation, their workforce had shrunk significantly, requiring much less office space, leaving floors of the tower empty. The building was also aging, requiring significant maintenance expenses. The JEA leadership appeared to be leaning toward demolition of the complex, but several groups opposed it, claiming the property was within the Downtown Jacksonville Historic District. Because of that, the Jacksonville Historic Preservation Commission would need give their approval before demolition could proceed. There are seven elements involved in determining landmark designation and a structure must comply with at least two; four if the owner objects. Some observers thought the JEA building complied with six of seven criteria. In the summer of 2024 the JEA board declared the building as surplus and authorized their managing director to sell it. In February 2025, the company announced that they were accepting bids for redevelopment of the vacant buildings at their former headquarters.

=== Sale ===
The Awards Committee from JEA selected the plan from Live Oak Contracting to purchase JEA's former tower for $1 million in August 2025. Their plan named, The Jewel at 21 West LLC, would redevelop it into a mixed-use project with retail, residential and restaurant components. The ground-floor would contain retail and a restaurant. The upper stories would have at least 180 standard residences and penthouse residences. The top floor, for a time the rotating Embers Restaurant, would become some combination of amenity deck, rooftop lounge, specialty restaurant/bar or a private venue for residents. Project architect would be design firm Gensler. When negotiations are complete, the JEA board of directors must approve the deal. Live Oak will request tax incentives from the Downtown Investment Authority and expect to close the sale in 18 months.

== See also ==
- Architecture of Jacksonville
- Downtown Jacksonville
- List of tallest buildings in Jacksonville
