= EverBank Center =

Skyscraper in Jacksonville, Florida

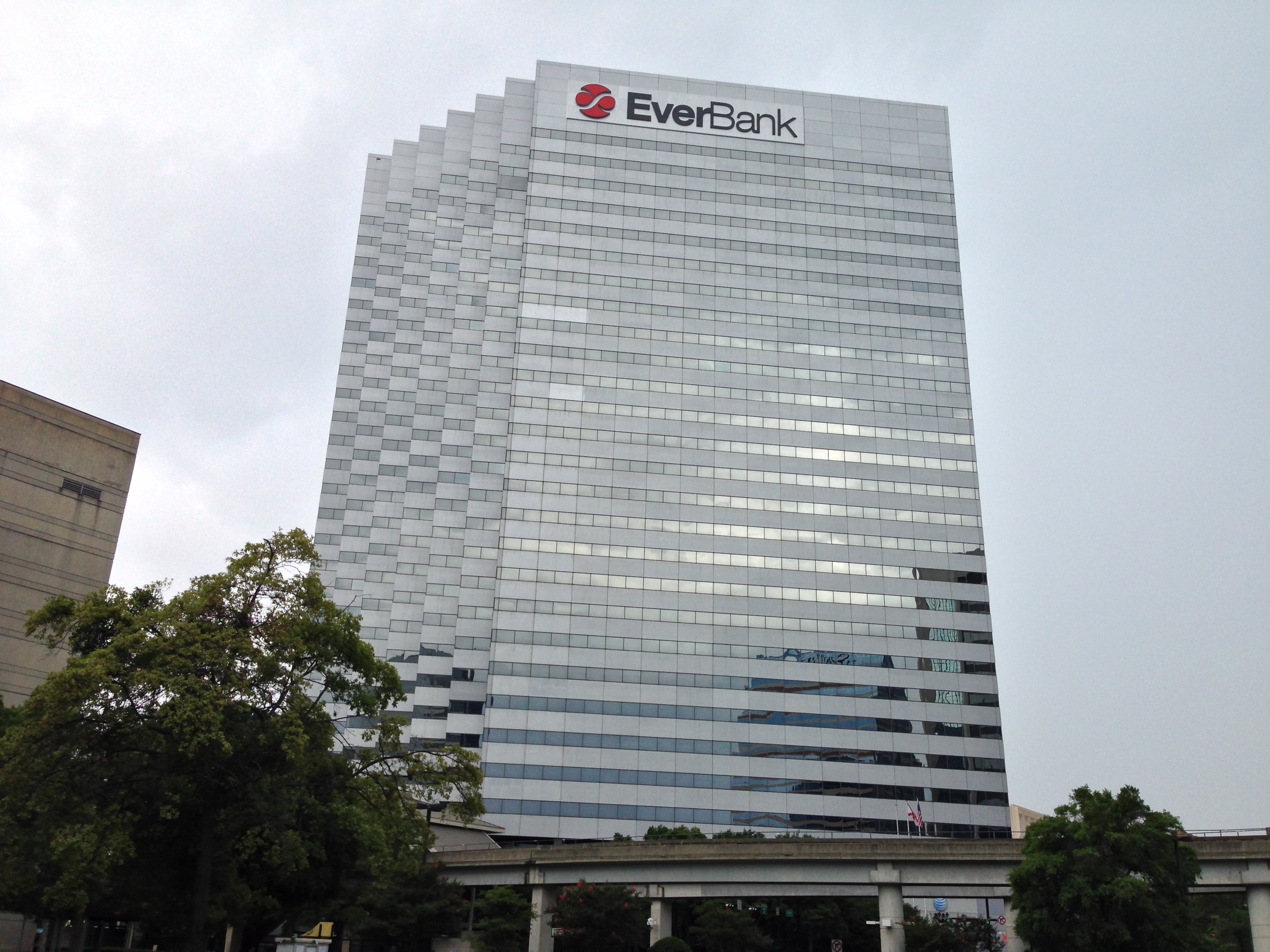

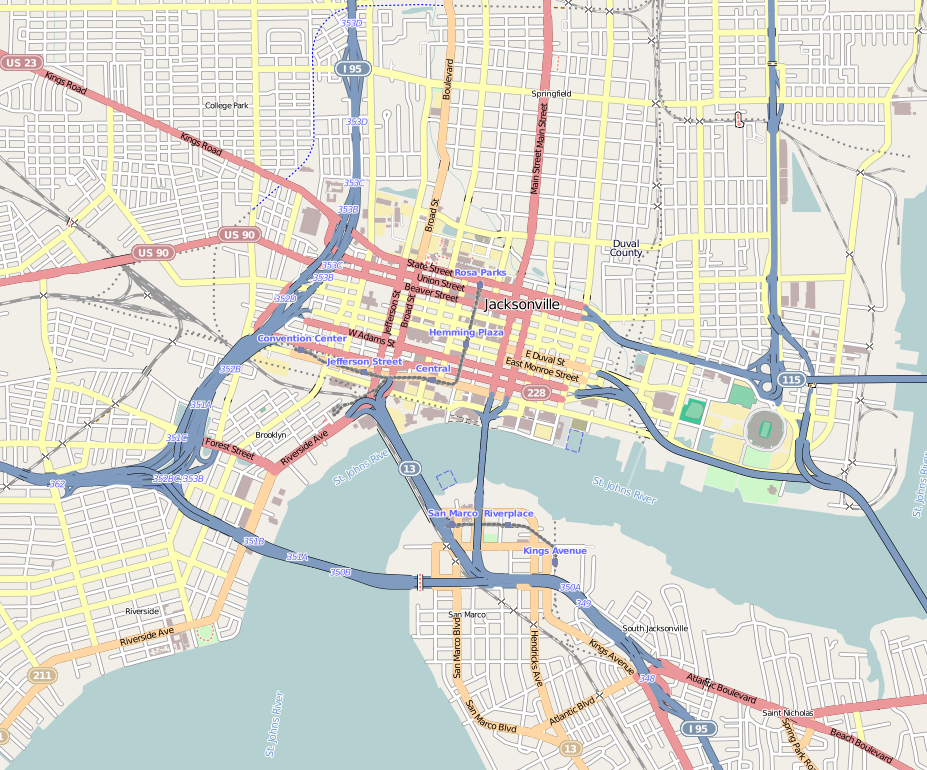
- Location within Central Jacksonville Location within Florida

General information
- Type: Class "A" office
- Architectural style: Modernist
- Location: 301 West Bay Street, Jacksonville, Florida, United States
- Coordinates: 30.32754°N 81.66222°W
- Construction started: 1982; 44 years ago
- Completed: 1983; 43 years ago
- Opening: 1983; 43 years ago
- Owner: Amkin Real Estate

Height
- Roof: 435 ft (133 m)

Technical details
- Floor count: 32
- Floor area: 956,201 sq ft (88,834.0 m^{2})
- Lifts/elevators: 14

Design and construction
- Architect: KBJ Architects
- Main contractor: The Auchter Company

EverBank Center is a skyscraper in Jacksonville, Florida, with naming rights owned by EverBank, the anchor tenant. Standing 447 feet (136 m) tall, it ranked third on the list of tallest buildings in Jacksonville, and is the largest in terms of class "A" rentable area with 956,201 sq ft (88,834.0 m^{2}). The building was formerly known as the Southern Bell Telephone Building, the AT&T Tower, and TIAA Bank Center.

It takes up an entire city block in Downtown Jacksonville. The building was built by The Auchter Company. A notable feature of the structure is that each floor has 16 corner offices.

The entrance to the building features a two-story atrium. There is a 280-seat auditorium on the second level and a backup power system for the entire building. The JTA Skyway central station is across the street and an adjoining seven-level parking garage has spaces for 641 vehicles.

== History ==
The building was designed by KBJ Architects and opened in 1983. The building was constructed on the former site of the Hotel Mayflower.

The tower was built for the Southern Bell Telephone company. The following year, American Telephone & Telegraph (AT&T) was forced to divest its regional phone companies and Southern Bell became a unit of BellSouth; the signage was changed to reflect the new name. In 2006, AT&T re-acquired BellSouth and the signage was changed back to AT&T in 2008.

=== Ownership ===
In September 2004, the building and a nearby garage were purchased by El-Ad Group for $90.9 million. In 2014, the building and the nearby parking garage were acquired by Amkin Real Estate for $47.4 million.

== Tenants ==
Citizens Property Insurance Corporation is a tenant.

In 2011, CSX vacated space it had rented in the tower, leaving it mostly empty. Later that year, the City of Jacksonville finalized a deal with EverBank, in which the bank received tax incentives to relocate over 1,200 employees into 9 floors of the building and add 200 jobs.

In April 2013, AT&T vacated the building.

== Gallery ==
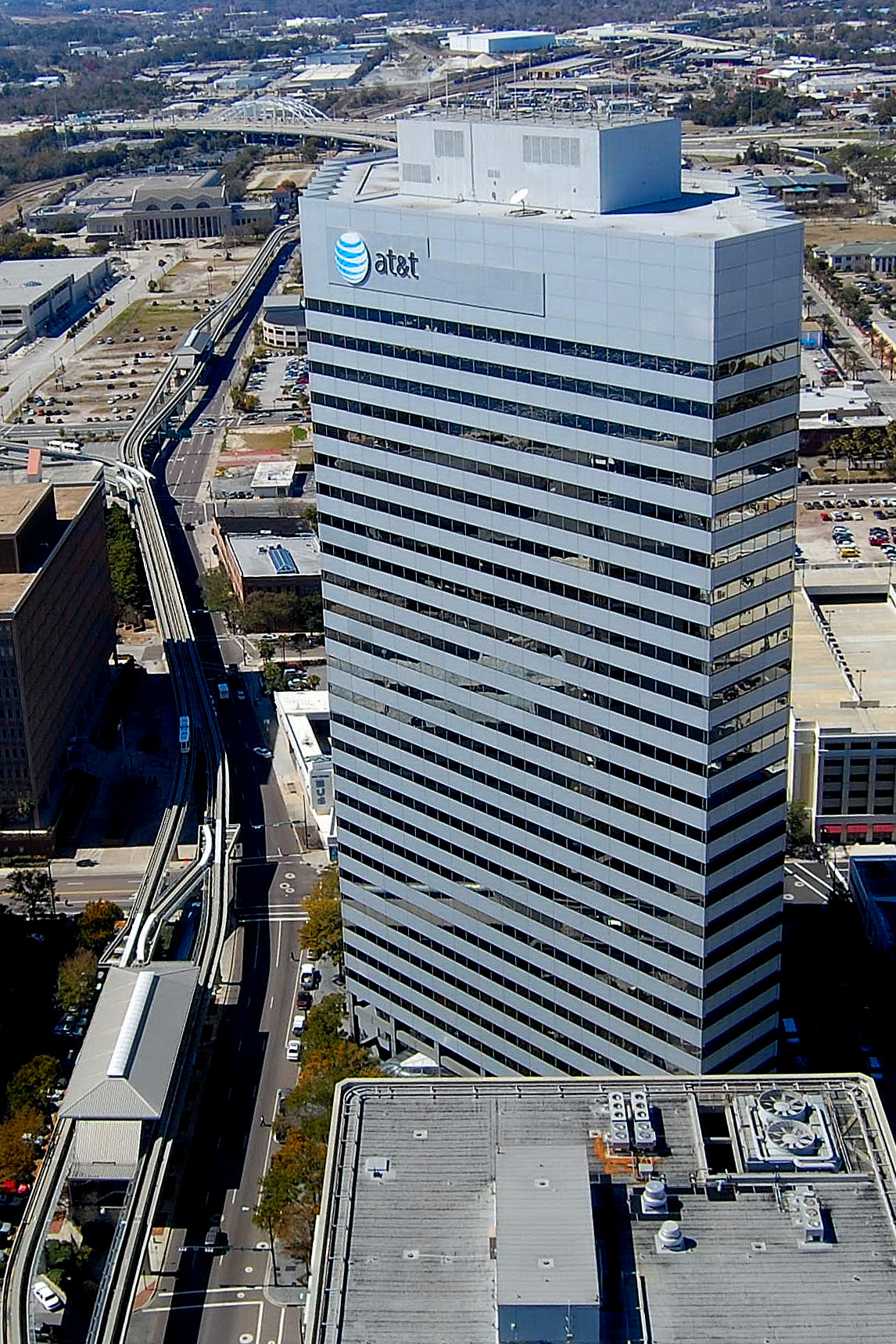

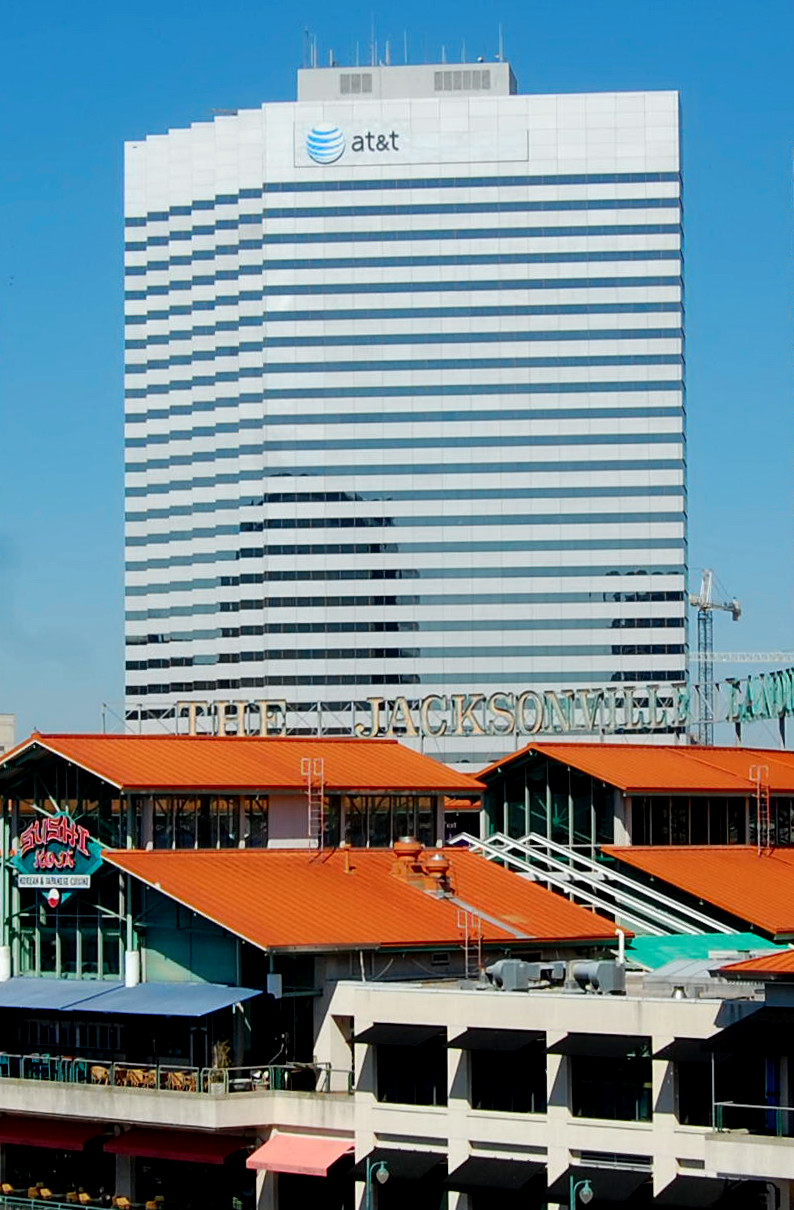

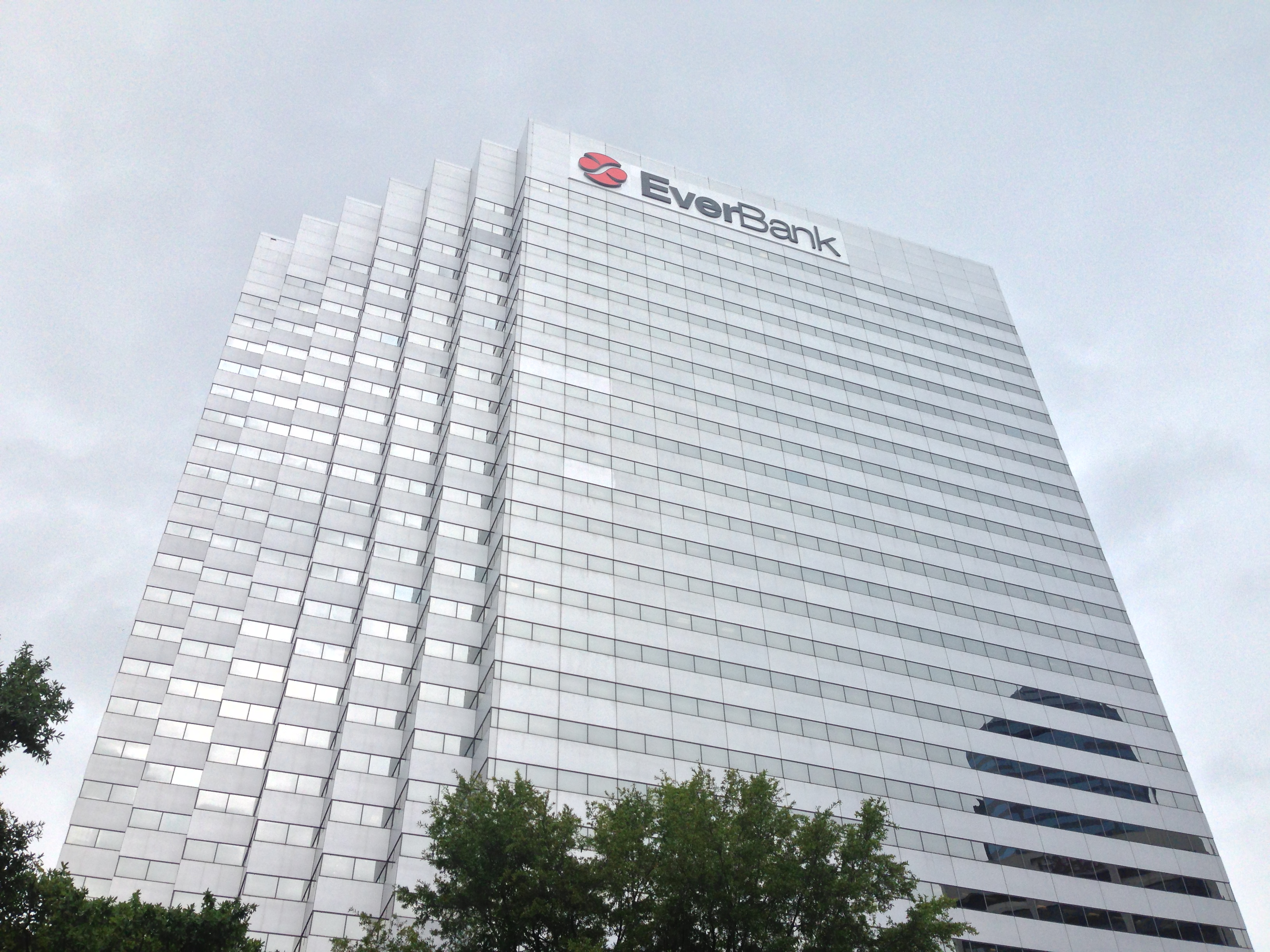

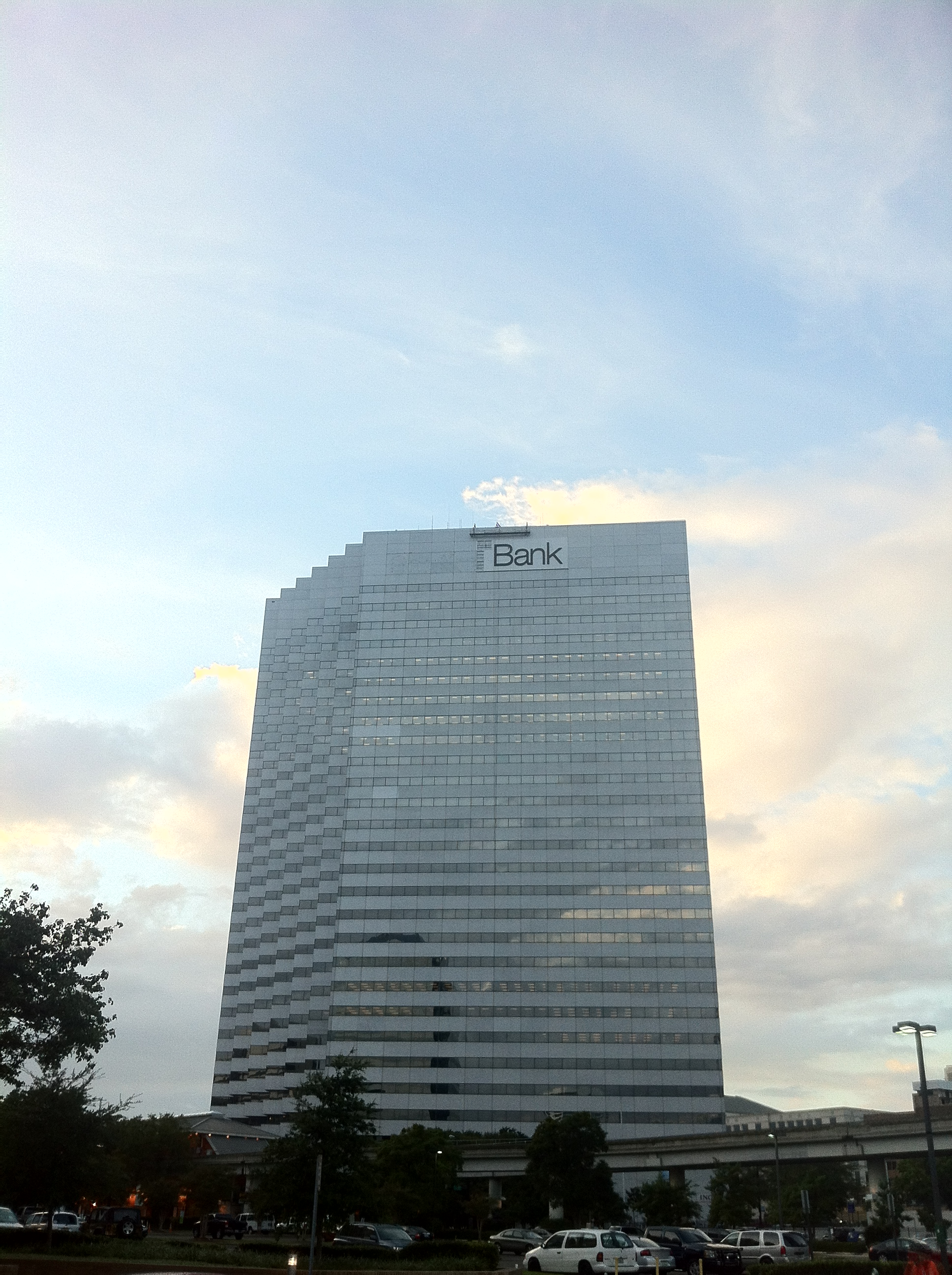

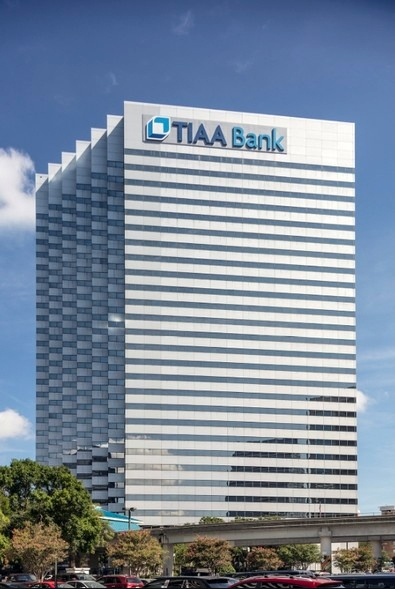

== See also ==
- Architecture of Jacksonville
- Downtown Jacksonville
- List of tallest buildings in Jacksonville
- List of tallest buildings in Florida
