= VyStar Credit Union =

Financial cooperative in Florida, US

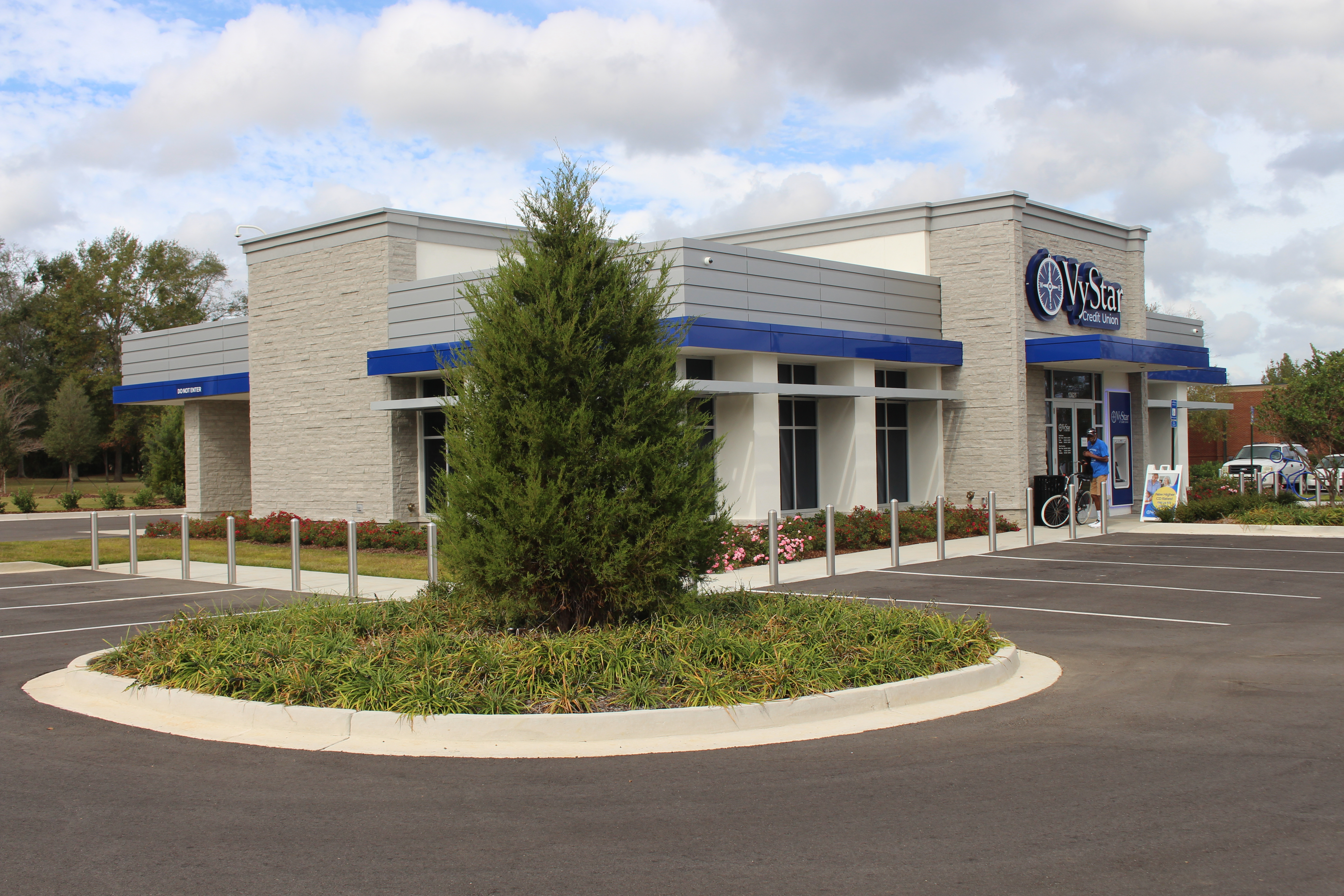
- branch in Thomasville, Georgia
- Company type: Credit union
- Industry: Financial services
- Founded: 1952
- Headquarters: VyStar Tower, Jacksonville, Florida
- Number of locations: 80+ full-service branches 18 high school branches
- Key people: Brian Wolfburg, President & CEO; P. Kem Siddons, Chairman, Board of Directors
- Products: Savings; checking; consumer loans; mortgages; credit cards; investment services; retirement planning; financial counseling; online banking; insurance; underwriting; money markets; certification of deposits;
- Total assets: $13.0B USD (Oct. 2021)
- Number of employees: 2,000
- Website: https://vystarcu.org

VyStar Credit Union is a member-owned financial cooperative that is headquartered in Jacksonville, Florida. It offers a comprehensive selection of products, including deposit and loan services for consumers and businesses, as well as investments, insurance, retirement planning and financial counseling. Founded in 1952 as Jax Navy Federal Credit Union, VyStar is the largest mortgage lender and the fourth-largest financial institution in Northeast Florida. It is regulated by the Florida Office of Financial Regulation and federally insured by the National Credit Union Share Insurance (NCUSIF) offered by the National Credit Union Administration (NCUA).

== History ==
Originally named Jax Navy Federal Credit Union, VyStar was chartered in April 1952 by 12 founding members with $60 at Naval Air Station Jacksonville. The mission of the founding members was to provide civil service and military personnel and their families a safe place to save and borrow money. One year later, 1,100 members had joined, and by the end of the decade, membership had grown to 9,178. By September 1995, assets had reached $1 billion as membership and branch locations continued to be added.

In 2002, Jax Navy celebrated its 50th anniversary with a rebranding effort that included a name change to VyStar Credit Union and approval from the states of Florida and Georgia to expand its field of membership to all who lived or worked in Duval, Clay, Nassau, St. Johns or Baker counties in Florida, and Camden, Charlton, Glynn and Ware in Georgia. Its membership base was later expanded to much of northern Florida and southeast Georgia. The name came from a combination of "vying" (meaning contending with other local financial institutions) and "star" (to highlight the outstanding work of its employees).

In 2015, VyStar surpassed 500,000 members.

In 2018, VyStar relocated its headquarters from the Cascone Building on Jacksonville's Westside to the newly-christened VyStar Tower, a 23-story high-rise on the Northbank of the St. Johns River which had been oft-renamed since its opening in 1989. At the time, the move was the largest corporate relocation to downtown Jacksonville since 2011.

In 2022, VyStar Credit Union celebrated its 70th anniversary.

=== Online banking ===
In February 2016, VyStar transitioned to a new online banking platform. This change required every user of online banking to re-enroll. This caused extremely high traffic volume, which shut down the system and caused members to lose access to their online banking for approximately one week.

A system change in May 2022 resulted in a longer outage which, again, left members without online access to their accounts and overwhelmed VyStar's call center with calls related to the online banking matter.

== Organization ==
VyStar is a not-for-profit financial cooperative owned by its members and governed by a volunteer Board of Directors. As of February 2020, VyStar has 59 full-service branches, 16 high-school branches and serves more than 700,000 members with approximately $9 billion in assets, making it the 16th-largest credit union by asset size among the more than 5,500 credit unions in the U.S. and the second-largest credit union headquartered in Florida.

VyStar also has more than 230 ATMs located in Northeast and Central Florida and access to more than 20,000 surcharge-free ATMs in the U.S., Canada and Mexico.

VyStar has more than 1,900 employees, making it one of Northeast Florida's largest employers.

== Membership ==
VyStar membership is extended to anyone who lives or works in the 49 contiguous counties of Central to North Florida, in addition to the Southeast Georgia counties of Camden, Charlton, Glynn and Ware.

In August 2019, VyStar announced its purchase of Citizens State Bank, a Florida state-chartered bank headquartered in Perry, Florida, with $280 million in assets. At the time, CSB had four locations—two in Gainesville and one each in Perry and Steinhatchee.

== VyStar Academy of Business and Finance ==
In 2007, VyStar worked with the Business and Finance Academy at Bartram Trail High School to form the VyStar Academy of Business and Finance and open the first VyStar high school credit union branch. At VyStar's high-school branches, students are taught skills related to the financial services and business management industries. The programs are student-run, which provides experience with the inner workings of key financial services, such as loans, credit cards, budgets and investment accounts.

Since 2007, VyStar has opened 15 additional high school branches at Fleming Island High School, Pedro Menendez High School, Samuel W. Wolfson High School, Jean Ribault High School, Orange Park High School, Yulee High School, West Nassau High School, Middleburg High School, First Coast High School, Palatka High School, Matanzas High School, Fletcher High School, Mandarin High School, Fernandina Beach High School and Clay High School.
