= Famous Players–Lasky =

American motion picture company

Famous Players–Lasky Corporation
- Logo used from 1921 to 1927

- Famous Players-Lasky Hollywood studio c. 1926 – c. 1927
- Industry: Film
- Predecessors: Famous Players Film Company; Lasky Feature Play Company
- Founded: June 28, 1916; 110 years ago
- Founders: Adolph Zukor; Jesse L. Lasky; Frohman brothers
- Defunct: August 3, 1933; 93 years ago
- Fate: Folded into Paramount Pictures
- Successor: Paramount Pictures; United Paramount Theaters
- Headquarters: Hollywood, California, United States

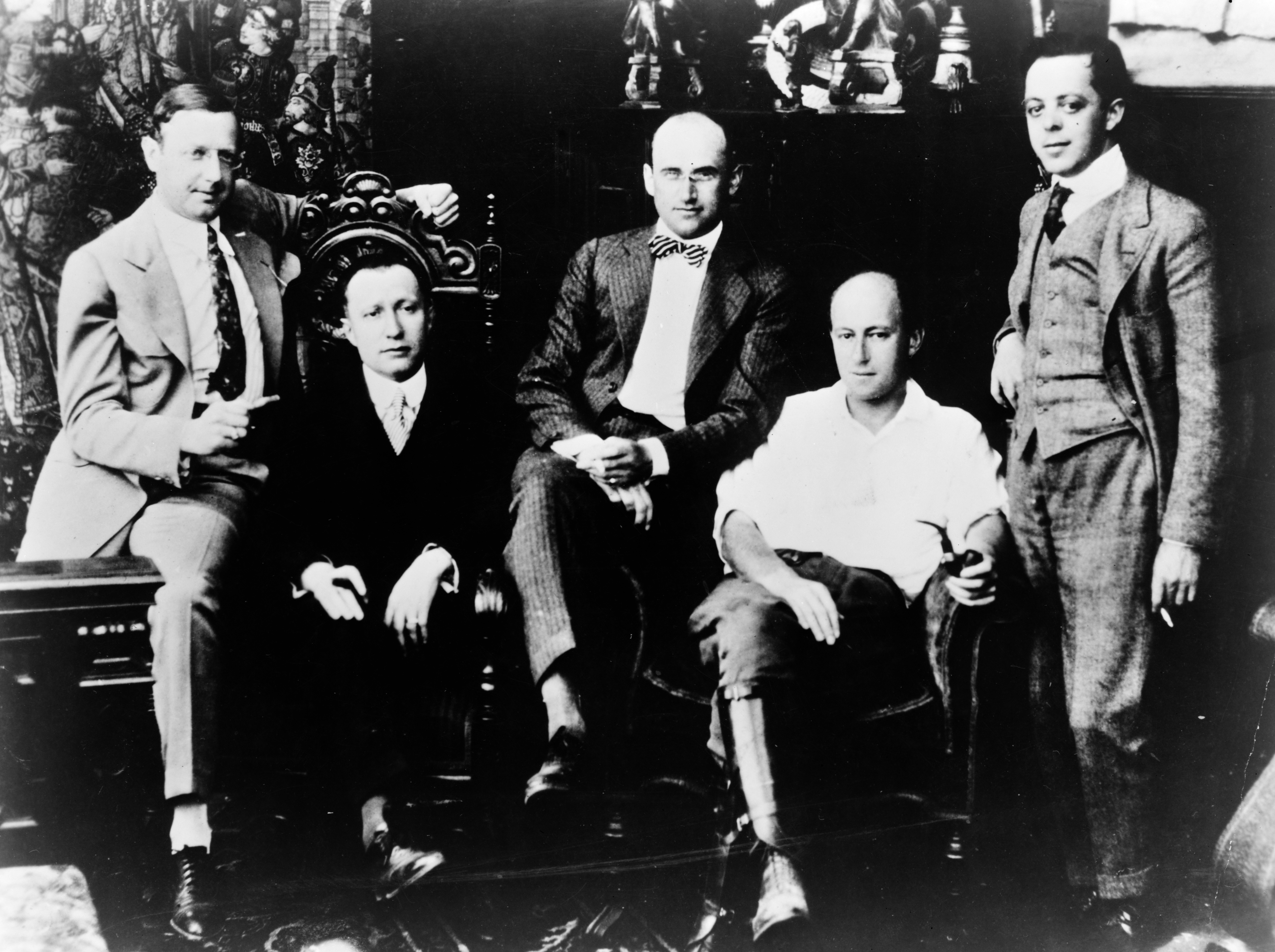
Partners of Famous Players–Lasky in 1916: Jesse L. Lasky, Adolph Zukor, Samuel Goldwyn, Cecil B. DeMille, Al Kaufman.

The Famous Players–Lasky Corporation was an American motion picture and distribution company operating from 1916 to 1933. It was formed from the merger of Adolph Zukor's Famous Players Film Company and the Jesse L. Lasky Feature Play Company.

The deal, guided by president Zukor, eventually resulted in the incorporation of eight film production companies, making the Famous Players–Lasky Corporation one of the biggest players of the silent film era. Famous Players–Lasky, under the direction of Zukor, is perhaps best known for its vertical integration of the film industry and block booking practices.

On April 1, 1927, the company name was changed to Paramount Famous Lasky Corporation. In September 1927, the Paramount Famous Lasky Corporation studio in Astoria (New York City) was temporarily closed with the objective of equipping it with the technology for the production of sound films. The Balaban and Katz Historical Foundation now owns the Famous Players trademark. In 2017, Paramount started a secondary film division known as Paramount Players, which acknowledges their heritage under the Famous Players name.

The former Famous Players–Lasky Movie Ranch at Lasky Mesa in the Simi Hills is now within the Upper Las Virgenes Canyon Open Space Preserve. The Astoria studio was designated a national historic district and added to the National Register of Historic Places in 1978. The district encompasses six contributing buildings.

== History ==
=== Formation ===
In 1914, film-production companies Famous Players Films (founded in 1912 by Adolph Zukor in partnership with the Frohman brothers) and Jesse L. Lasky Feature Plays (founded in 1911) signed a distribution deal with Paramount Pictures Corporation (founded by William Wadsworth Hodkinson in 1914). Under the agreement Hodkinson would distribute the two companies' films through a 65/35 arrangement in which the producer agreed to take only 65% of film profits with 35% of the gross revenue going to Hodkinson's Paramount. While initially the agreement seemed like a good deal, Zukor and Lasky quickly realized that they could make much higher revenues if they could integrate the production and distribution of their films. Accordingly, less than a year into their distribution contracts the two men began looking for a way to buy Hodkinson out of Paramount and to incorporate the three companies.

In late 1915 Zukor began buying as much Paramount stock as possible, including stock belonging to Hiram Abrams, a member of the Paramount board of directors. On July 13, 1916, at Paramount Corporation's annual board meeting, Hodkinson found himself ousted from the presidency and replaced by Abrams, who won the seat by a single vote. After accepting the presidency, Abrams announced to the board, "On behalf of Adolph Zukor, who has purchased my shares in Paramount, I call this meeting to order."

Within a week of removing Hodkinson, on July 19, 1916, Famous Players and the Lasky Feature Play Company merged to form Famous Players–Lasky, with Zukor as president and Jesse L. Lasky as vice president. For a brief period Famous Players–Lasky acted as a holding company for its subsidiaries: Famous Players, Feature Play, Oliver Morosco Photoplay, Bosworth, Cardinal, Paramount Pictures Corporation, Artcraft, and The George M. Cohan Film Corporation. However, on December 29, 1917, all of the subsidiaries were incorporated into one entity called the Famous Players–Lasky Corporation.

=== The push for vertical integration ===
However, Zukor was not satisfied simply with consolidation. The cost of producing films was rising – screenplays cost more to purchase and the rise of the star system meant that celebrities were demanding higher salaries. The problem of fog inside the Islington Studios in London was solved by Carrier Engineering Corporation's innovative air treatment system. Zukor needed to increase revenue, and he would do so over the next ten years by integrating film production, distribution, and exhibition into one corporation.

In 1919, Famous Players–Lasky faced a boycott from the First National Exhibitions Circuit, a group that controlled nearly 600 theaters nationwide. The Circuit disagreed with the corporation's distribution practices, which required theaters to purchase large blocks of feature films, often sight-unseen. In addition to selling strategic blocks of features, theater owners were offered options such as "program distribution", in which the exhibitor booked a single evening's worth of entertainment, and "star series" in which the exhibitor signed up for a given number of pictures per year featuring a particular star. "Selective Bookings" in which exhibitors were allowed to purchase a single film, made up only a small percentage of the corporation's offerings.

The Circuit's protest of these practices and boycott of Famous Players–Lasky films put the corporation in desperate need of its own theaters. In 1919, Zukor began directing the purchase of theater chains across the nation. In the Northeast, Zukor acquired Alfred Black's New England Theaters, Inc. and in the South, Zukor acquired S.A. Lynch's Southern Enterprises, which owned approximately 200 theaters and was at the time the exclusive Paramount distributor in 11 Southern states. In order to weaken First National, Zukor also sent Lynch and Black to acquire theaters held by First National members, often employing heavy-handed tactics. By the mid-1920s, the Famous Players–Lasky Corporation was one of the largest theater owners in the world, with a controlling interest in the Rialto, Rivoli and Criterion theater chains. However, in 1921 the corporation hit a brief stumbling block when Zukor's practice of block booking films and buying up theatres led to an FTC antitrust suit.

=== The finish ===
On April 24, 1930, Paramount-Famous Lasky Corporation became the Paramount Publix Corporation. Financial problems within the movie industry as a result of the Great Depression pushed Paramount Publix Corporation, with $2,020,024 in debts but only $134,718 in assets, into receivership on August 3, 1933.

== Federal Trade Commission v. Famous Players–Lasky Corporation, et al. ==
=== Charges ===
On August 30, 1921, the Federal Trade Commission formally charged Famous Players–Lasky Corporation, Realart Pictures Corporation, The Stanley Company of America, Stanley Booking Corporation, Black New England Theaters, Inc., Southern Enterprises, Inc., Saenger Amusement Company, Adolph Zukor, Jesse L. Lasky, Jules Mastbaum, Alfred S. Black, S.A. Lynch, Ernest V. Richards, Jr., with restraint of trade as part of an investigation into the industry practice of block booking. Describing the corporation as the "largest concern in the motion picture industry and the biggest theater owner in the world," the Federal Trade Commission accused Famous Players–Lasky and eleven other correspondents with "conspiracy and restraint of trade" in violation of the antitrust laws. In addition to block-booking charges, the case also accused Famous Players–Lasky of using theater acquisition to intimidate film exhibitors into agreeing to unwanted block booking deals.

Several grievances were brought to court, including one from an independent theater owner in Middleton, New York, who claimed when his movie house rejected a five-year block booking deal with Famous Players–Lasky, the distributor used predatory tactics to run him out of business. The theater owner reportedly withstood threats and goon-squad intimidation that recalled the tactics of the former Edison Trust. When those tactics failed, the theater owner claimed Famous Players–Lasky built a movie house across the street from his theater in Middleton, and resorted to temporary price cutting and overbuying in order to destroy his business.

=== Case results ===
After reviewing a massive 17,000 pages of testimony and 15,000 pages of exhibits the FTC concluded in early 1927 that block booking was an unfair trade practice. On July 9, 1927, it ordered the Famous Players–Lasky Corporation to cease and desist block booking practices and reform its theater purchasing policies. The three respondents- Adolph Zukor, Jesse Lasky and the Famous Players–Lasky Corporation- were given 60 days to comply with the ruling.

The corporation largely ignored the cease and desist order and stalled reforms. After the 60-day deadline arrived, they were granted two extensions. On April 15, 1928, the corporation, now the Paramount-Famous-Lasky Corporation, submitted a report of compliance to the FTC. The report disputed the charges, and denied that it practiced block booking. The defiance attracted negative press attention and the report was rejected by the FTC. The corporation's non-compliance eventually led to the FTC taking antitrust action against the Paramount-Famous-Lasky Corporation.

== Star power ==
In part, the success of the Famous Players–Lasky Corporation can be attributed to Adolph Zukor's adept handling of the star system. Celebrities such as Mary Pickford, Marguerite Clark, Rudolph Valentino, Gloria Swanson, Clara Bow, Nancy Carroll, Sessue Hayakawa, Mae Murray, opera singer Geraldine Farrar, Owen Moore, Thomas Meighan, Cleo Ridgely, and Ruth Chatterton helped to define the Famous Player-Lasky brand.

== Major films ==
- The Sheik (1921)
- Blood and Sand (1922)
- The Covered Wagon (1923)
- The Ten Commandments (1923)
- Beau Geste (1926)
- It (1927)
- Wings (1927)
