= Studio system =

Method of film production

A studio system is a method of filmmaking wherein the production and distribution of films is dominated by a small number of large movie studios. It is most often used in reference to Hollywood motion picture studios during the early years of the Golden Age of Hollywood from 1927 (the introduction of sound motion pictures) to 1948 (the beginning of the demise of the studio system), wherein studios produced films primarily on their own filmmaking lots with creative personnel under often long-term contract, and dominated exhibition through vertical integration, i.e., the ownership or effective control of distributors and exhibition, guaranteeing additional sales of films through manipulative booking techniques such as block booking.

During Golden Age Hollywood, eight companies constituted the major studios that promulgated the Hollywood studio system. Of these eight, five were fully integrated conglomerates known as the original Big Five, combining ownership of a production studio, distribution division, and substantial theater chain, and contract players and filmmaking personnel: Metro-Goldwyn-Mayer (owned by Loews Incorporated, owner of America's largest theater chain), Paramount Pictures, Warner Bros., 20th Century-Fox, and RKO Radio Pictures (the last of these five, which emerged in 1928). Also at this time, two of the Little Three major-minors (Columbia Pictures and Universal Pictures) were similarly organized, though without more than small theater circuits, and the third (United Artists) owned a small number of theaters and had access to two production facilities owned by members of its controlling partnership group, but it functioned primarily as a backer-distributor, financing independent productions and releasing their films.

The Walt Disney Company was founded in 1923 but it was an animation studio and did not own its own theaters, so it was not considered a peer of the major studios. Disney did expand into live-action movies in the 1940s, and by 1986 it grew to be considered one of a new "Big Six". Ironically, Disney is the only one of these studios that originated in the 1940s and continuously operated as the same company to the present day, as even those which survived into the 21st century, such as Paramount and Warner Bros., went through several mergers and restructurings.

The studio system was challenged under the antitrust laws in a 1948 Supreme Court ruling which sought to separate production from the distribution and exhibition and ended such practices, thereby hastening the end of the studio system. By 1954, with television competing for audience and the last of the operational links between a major production studio and theater chain broken, the historic era of the studio system was over.

== Sound and the Big Five ==
The years 1927 and 1928 are generally seen as the beginning of Hollywood's Golden Age and the final major steps in establishing studio system control of the American film business. The success of 1927's The Jazz Singer, the first feature-length "talkie" (in fact, the majority of its scenes did not have live-recorded sound) gave a big boost to the then midsized Warner Bros. studio. The following year saw both the general introduction of sound throughout the industry and two more smashes for Warners: The Singing Fool, The Jazz Singer's even more profitable follow-up, and Hollywood's first "all-talking" feature, Lights of New York. Just as significant were a number of offscreen developments. Warner Bros., now flush with income, acquired the extensive Stanley theater chain in September 1928. One month later, it purchased a controlling interest in the First National production company, then still regarded as the more prominent company. With the First National acquisition came not only a 135-acre (55 ha) studio and backlot but another large string of movie theaters.

The last of the "Big Five" Hollywood conglomerates of the Golden Age emerged in 1928: RKO Pictures. The Radio Corporation of America (RCA), led by David Sarnoff, was looking for ways to exploit the cinema sound patents, newly trademarked RCA Photophone, owned by its parent company, General Electric. As the leading film production companies were all preparing to sign exclusive agreements with Western Electric for their technology, RCA got into the movie business itself. In January, General Electric acquired a sizable interest in Film Booking Offices of America (FBO), a distributor and small production company owned by Joseph P. Kennedy, father of future president John F. Kennedy. In October, through a set of stock transfers, RCA gained control of both FBO and the Keith-Albee-Orpheum theater chain; merging them into a single venture, it created the Radio-Keith-Orpheum Corporation, Sarnoff chairing the board. With RKO and Warner Bros. (soon to become Warner Bros.–First National) joining Fox, Paramount, and Loew's/MGM as major players, the Big Five that would remain for thirty years were now in place.

Although RKO was an exception, the heads of studios on the West Coast, the "movie moguls", had mostly been in place for some years: Louis B. Mayer at MGM, Jack L. Warner at Warner Bros., Adolph Zukor at Paramount, William Fox and Darryl F. Zanuck (at 20th Century Fox from 1935), Carl Laemmle at Universal, and Harry Cohn at Columbia.

== Reign of the majors and the first decline ==
The ranking of the Big Five in terms of profitability (closely related to market share) was largely consistent during the Golden Age: MGM was number one eleven years running, 1931–41. Paramount, the most profitable studio of the early sound era (1928–30), faded for the better part of the subsequent decade, and Fox was number two for most of MGM's reign. Paramount began a steady climb in 1940, finally edging past MGM two years later; from then until its reorganization in 1949 it was again the most financially successful of the Big Five. With the exception of 1932—when all the companies but MGM lost money, and RKO lost somewhat less than its competitors—RKO was next to last or (usually) last every year of the Golden Age, with Warner generally hanging alongside at the back of the pack. Of the smaller majors, the Little Three, United Artists reliably held up the rear, with Columbia strongest in the 1930s and Universal ahead for most of the 1940s.

Hollywood's success grew during the Great Depression, possibly because films helped audiences escape their personal difficulties. President Franklin Delano Roosevelt said of Shirley Temple, "When the spirit of the people is lower than at any other time during this Depression, it is a splendid thing that for just fifteen cents an American can go to a movie and look at the smiling face of a baby and forget his troubles". Studios released up to 70 films each year. By 1939, there were 15,000 movie theaters in the United States, more than banks; the number of theaters per capita was twice that of the mid-1980s. The cinema industry was larger than that for office machines. While only the 14th largest by revenue, it was second in the percentage of profits that its executives received. Top stars such as Bing Crosby and Claudette Colbert were paid more than $400,000 a year ($9,258,373 today).

== The end of the system and the death of RKO ==
One of the techniques used to support the studio system was block booking, a system of selling multiple films to a theater as a unit. Such a unit—five films was the standard practice for most of the 1940s—typically included only one particularly outstanding film, the rest being a mix of A-budget pictures of lesser quality and B movies. As Life magazine wrote in 1957 in a retrospective on the studio system, "It wasn't good entertainment and it wasn't art, and most of the movies produced had a uniform mediocrity, but they were also uniformly profitable ... The million-dollar mediocrity was the very backbone of Hollywood."

On May 4, 1948, in a federal antitrust suit known as the Paramount case brought against the entire Big Five, the U.S. Supreme Court specifically outlawed block booking. Holding that the conglomerates were indeed in violation of antitrust, the justices refrained from making a final decision as to how that fault should be remedied, but the case was sent back to the lower court from which it had come with language that suggested divorcement—the complete separation of exhibition interests from producer-distributor operations—was the answer. The Big Five, though, seemed united in their determination to fight on and drag out legal proceedings for years as they had already proven adept at—after all, the Paramount suit had originally been filed on July 20, 1938.

However, behind the scenes at RKO, long the financially shakiest of the conglomerates, the court ruling came to be looked at as a development that could be used to the studio's advantage. The same month that the decision was handed down, multimillionaire Howard Hughes acquired a controlling interest in the company. As RKO controlled the fewest theaters of any of the Big Five, Hughes decided that starting a divorcement domino effect could actually help put his studio on a more equal footing with his competitors. Hughes signaled his willingness to the federal government to enter into a consent decree obliging the breakup of his movie business. Under the agreement, Hughes would split his studio into two entities, RKO Pictures Corporation and RKO Theatres Corporation, and commit to selling off his stake in one or the other by a certain date. Hughes's decision to concede to divorcement terminally undermined the argument by lawyers for the rest of the Big Five that such breakups were unfeasible.

While many today point to the May court ruling, it is actually Hughes's agreement with the federal government—signed November 8, 1948—that was truly the death knell for the Golden Age of Hollywood. Paramount soon capitulated, entering into a similar consent decree the following February. The studio, which had fought against divorcement for so long, became the first of the majors to break up, ahead of schedule, finalizing divestiture on December 31, 1949. By this time, there were 19,000 movie theaters in the United States.

Through Hughes's deal with the federal authorities, and those by the other studios that soon followed, the studio system lingered on for another half-decade. The major studio that adapted to the new circumstances with the most immediate success was the smallest, United Artists; under a new management team that took over in 1951, overhead was cut by terminating its lease arrangement with the Pickford-Fairbanks production facility and new relationships with independent producers, now often involving direct investment, were forged—a business model that Hollywood would increasingly emulate in coming years. The studio system around which the industry had been organized for three decades finally expired in 1954, when Loew's, the last holdout, severed all operational ties with MGM.

Hughes's gambit helped break the studio system, but it did little for RKO. His disruptive leadership—coupled with the draining away of audiences to television that was affecting the entire industry—took a toll on the studio that was evident to Hollywood observers. When Hughes sought to bail out of his RKO interest in 1952, he had to turn to a Chicago-based syndicate led by shady dealers without motion picture experience. The deal fell through, so Hughes was back in charge when the RKO theater chain was finally sold off as mandated in 1953. That year, General Tire and Rubber Company, which was expanding its small, decade-old broadcasting division, approached Hughes concerning the availability of RKO's film library for programming. Hughes acquired near-complete ownership of RKO Pictures in December 1954 and consummated a sale with General Tire for the entire studio the following summer.

The new owners quickly made some of their money back by selling the TV rights for the library they treasured to C&C Television Corp., a beverage company subsidiary. (RKO retained the rights for the few TV stations General Tire had brought along.) Under the deal, the films were stripped of their RKO identity before being sent by C&C to local stations; the famous opening logo, with its globe and radio tower, was removed, as were the studio's other trademarks.

Back in Hollywood, RKO's new owners were encountering little success in the moviemaking business and by 1957 General Tire shut down production and sold the main RKO facilities to Desilu, the production company of Lucille Ball and Desi Arnaz. Just like United Artists, the studio now no longer had a studio; unlike UA, it barely owned its old movies and saw no profit in the making of new ones. In 1959 it abandoned the movie business entirely.

== In Europe and Asia ==
While the studio system is largely identified as an American phenomenon, film production companies in other countries did at times achieve and maintain full integration in a manner similar to Hollywood's Big Five. As historian James Chapman describes,

In Britain, only two companies ever achieved full vertical integration (the Rank Organization and the Associated British Picture Corporation). Other countries where some level of vertical integration occurred were Germany during the 1920s (Universum Film Aktiengesellschaft, or Ufa), France during the 1930s (Gaumont-Franco-Film-Aubert and Pathé-Natan) and Japan (Nikkatsu, Shochiku and Toho). In Hong Kong, Shaw Brothers adopted the studio system for its wuxia films throughout the 1950s–'60s. India, which represents perhaps the only serious rival to the U.S. film industry due to its dominance of both its own and the Asian diasporic markets, has, in contrast, never achieved any degree of vertical integration.

For instance, in 1929, nearly 75 percent of Japanese movie theaters were connected with either Nikkatsu or Shochiku, the two biggest studios at the time.

== After the system ==
We find ourselves ... dealing with corporations rather than with individuals.

— Harry Cohn of Columbia Pictures, 1957

=== Star-driven system ===
In the 1950s Hollywood faced three great challenges: The Paramount case ending the studio system, the new popularity of television, and consumer spending providing its audience with many other leisure options. The scale of both box office successes and flops grew, with a "dangerous middle" consisting of films that in the previous era would have made money. A filmmaker stated in 1957 that "[t]he one absolute disaster today is to make a million-dollar mediocrity. One of these you can lose not only your total investment but your total shirt." By that year Hollywood was only making about 300 feature films a year, compared to about 700 during the 1920s. Darryl F. Zanuck, head of 20th Century Fox, had no direct involvement with the studio from 1956 to 1962, and Louis B. Mayer, sacked in 1951 from MGM, died in 1957. Harry Cohn of Columbia, who died the following year, informed investors in the studio's annual report of 1957 that:

We find ourselves in a highly competitive market for these talents [stars, directors, producers, writers]. Under today's tax structures, salary to those we are dealing with is less inviting than the opportunity for capital gains. We find ourselves, therefore, dealing with corporations rather than with individuals. We find ourselves, too, forced to deal in terms of a percentage of the film's profits, rather than in a guaranteed salary as in the past. This is most notable among the top stars.

Most contract players became freelancers after the end of the studio system. Financial backers increasingly demanded star actors, directors, and writers for projects to reduce risk of failure. The growing importance of the overseas market—40 to 50% of Hollywood's total revenue by 1957—also emphasized stars' names as box-office attractions. They were in great demand, studio head of Paramount Y. Frank Freeman stating in 1957 that even if Hollywood had a dictator with absolute control and perfect awareness of what moviegoers wanted, "He still couldn't turn out 25 'must-see' pictures in a year. That's the top limit imposed by the amount of Talent we have".

With their new power, "working for nothing"—receiving a percentage of profit instead of a salary—became a status symbol for stars. A top actor could expect 50% of profit, with a minimum guarantee, or 10% of gross revenue. Cary Grant, for example, received more than $700,000 (equivalent to $6.6 million in 2025) from his 10% of the gross for To Catch a Thief (1955), while director and producer Alfred Hitchcock received less than $50,000. In one extreme case, Paramount promised Marlon Brando 75% of the profit of what became One-Eyed Jacks (1961). (Because of Hollywood accounting, studios still received much of the revenue before any profit sharing; thus, they preferred 50% of profit to 10% of gross.) The larger paychecks also increased the power of talent agents such as Lew Wasserman of MCA, whose office was now nicknamed "Fort Knox".

By 1957, independent producers made 50% of full-length American films. Beyond working for others, top actors such as Gregory Peck and Frank Sinatra created their own production companies and purchased scripts. Top independent directors George Stevens, Billy Wilder, and William Wyler also saw their paychecks increase, in part because their involvement attracted star actors. Studios increasingly provided funding and facilities to independent producers as opposed to making their own films, or just like United Artists, they focused on distribution.

=== Syndication, television, recession, and conglomerate Hollywood ===
While television had damaged Hollywood and was growing overseas, TV production companies such as Desilu and the film studios' own TV divisions helped save the industry by using otherwise-unused facilities. Independent producers produced much American television programming into the 1960s. As major studios found that TV programs' success, and production costs and schedules, were more predictable (a Universal executive said "Just as General Motors turns out cars, we turn out television shows. It's a business") than films, by the early 1970s their programs dominated prime time.

At the beginning of the 1960s the major studios began to reissue older films for syndication and transformed into mainly producing telefilms and b-movies to supply TV's demand for programming. The industry underwent a severe recession, due in part to big-budget flops, but soon recovered artistically with such films as The Godfather (1972) and The Exorcist (1973).

Steven Spielberg's Jaws (1975) and George Lucas's Star Wars (1977) became the prototype for the modern blockbuster. Prior to Jaws, most films would initially be released in a few key cities, and would later spread to "secondary markets" across the country based on the response in those markets—a system called "platforming". Jaws was instead immediately released simultaneously across the country, and backed by a $700,000 TV advertising budget—the first time that trailers were released on network television—along with extensive promotional merchandising. The release of films at hundreds of venues became the norm, with hits such as the sequels to Lucas's Star Wars, The Empire Strikes Back and Return of the Jedi, Spielberg's back-to-back successes with Raiders of the Lost Ark and E.T. the Extra-Terrestrial, and the development of home-video and cable television. Meanwhile, the uncontrolled budget of Heaven's Gate (1980), and its limited box-office revenue, resulted in the sale of United Artists to MGM a year later.

From 1990 to 1995, New Hollywood turned into more of a conglomerate Hollywood and quickly dominating the entire global entertainment industry. Today, two of the five vertically integrated Golden Age majors (Paramount and Warner Bros.), continue to exist as major Hollywood studio entities along with major-minor Universal and Sony Pictures (formed by a merger between Columbia and TriStar), all of which were taken over by many different companies that were acquired by and merged with larger media conglomerates. Furthermore, in 1986, the Walt Disney Studios has emerged as a major in place of MGM, maintaining a "Big Six" until its acquisition of 20th Century Fox in early 2019 resulted in a "Big Five" once again. With the exception of Disney, all the other four of today's Big Five major studios (Paramount, Sony Pictures, Universal and Warner Bros.) are essentially based on the model not of the classic Big Five (at that time Paramount and Warner Bros. in addition to 20th Century Fox, MGM and RKO), but of the old United Artists: that is, they are primarily backer-distributors (and physical studio leasers) rather than actual production companies.

In 1996, Time Warner acquired the once-independent New Line Cinema via its purchase of Turner Broadcasting System. In 2008, New Line was merged into Warner Bros., where it continues to exist as a subsidiary. Each of today's Big Five controls quasi-independent "arthouse" divisions, such as Paramount Vantage. Miramax Films (which originally was an independent studio) was owned by Disney until 2010. Most also have divisions that focus on genre movies, B movies either literally by virtue of their low budgets, or spiritually—for instance, Sony's Screen Gems. One so-called indie division, Universal's Focus Features, releases arthouse films under that primary brand. Both Focus and Disney's arthouse division, Searchlight Pictures, are large enough to qualify as mini-majors. Two large independent firms also qualify as mini-majors, Lionsgate and the aforementioned MGM (acquired by Amazon in 2022). They stand somewhere between latter-day versions of the old "major-minor"—just like Columbia and Universal were in the 1930s and 1940s, except Lionsgate has about half their market share—and leading Golden Age independent production outfits such as Samuel Goldwyn Inc. and the companies of David O. Selznick.

=== Independent era and the beginning of the Second Decline ===
In the mid-2010s, major studios shifted towards producing films that appeal to a broader, worldwide audience. Successful productions generated large revenue. such as Avengers: Endgame with $2.799 billion worldwide in 2019.

The COVID-19 crisis contributed to a further decline, as movie theaters were closed and more films were released on streaming services marking an increase in competition in the streaming wars.

== See also ==
- Classical Hollywood cinema
- Hays Code
- Pre-Code Hollywood

== Sources ==
=== Published ===
- Bergan, Ronald (1986). The United Artists Story. New York: Crown. ISBN 0-517-56100-X
- Chapman, James (2003). Cinemas of the World: Film and Society from 1895 to the Present. London: Reaktion Books. ISBN 1-86189-162-8
- Finler, Joel W. (1988). The Hollywood Story. New York: Crown. ISBN 0-517-56576-5
- Goodwin, Doris Kearns (1987). The Fitzgeralds and the Kennedys. New York: Simon and Schuster. ISBN 0-671-23108-1
- Hirschhorn, Clive (1979). The Warner Bros. Story. New York: Crown. ISBN 0-517-53834-2
- Jewell, Richard B., with Vernon Harbin (1982). The RKO Story. New York: Arlington House/Crown. ISBN 0-517-54656-6
- Orbach, Barak Y. (2004). "Antitrust and Pricing in the Motion Picture Industry," Yale Journal on Regulation vol. 21, no. 2, summer (available online).
- Regev, Ronnie (2018). Working in Hollywood: How the Studio System Turned Creativity into Labor. Chapel Hill, NC: University of North Carolina Press.
- Schatz, Thomas (1998 [1988]). The Genius of the System: Hollywood Filmmaking in the Studio Era London: Faber and Faber. ISBN 0-571-19596-2
- Schatz, Thomas (1999 [1997]). Boom and Bust: American Cinema in the 1940s. Berkeley: University of California Press. ISBN 0-520-22130-3
- Utterson, Andrew (2005). Technology and Culture—The Film Reader. New York: Routledge/Taylor & Francis. ISBN 0-415-31984-6

=== Online ===
==== Authored ====
- Brand, Paul (2005). "'Nice Town. I'll Take It': Howard Hughes Revisited", Bright Lights Film Journal 47, February.
- Freiberg, Freda (2000). "Comprehensive Connections: The Film Industry, the Theatre and the State in the Early Japanese Cinema", Screening the Past 11, November 1.

==== Archival ====
- The Hollywood Antitrust Case, aka The Paramount Antitrust Case detailed history from the Society of Independent Motion Picture Producers research archive.
