= Hotel Roosevelt fire =

1963 fire in Jacksonville, Florida

Coordinates: 30.3284°N 81.6582°W

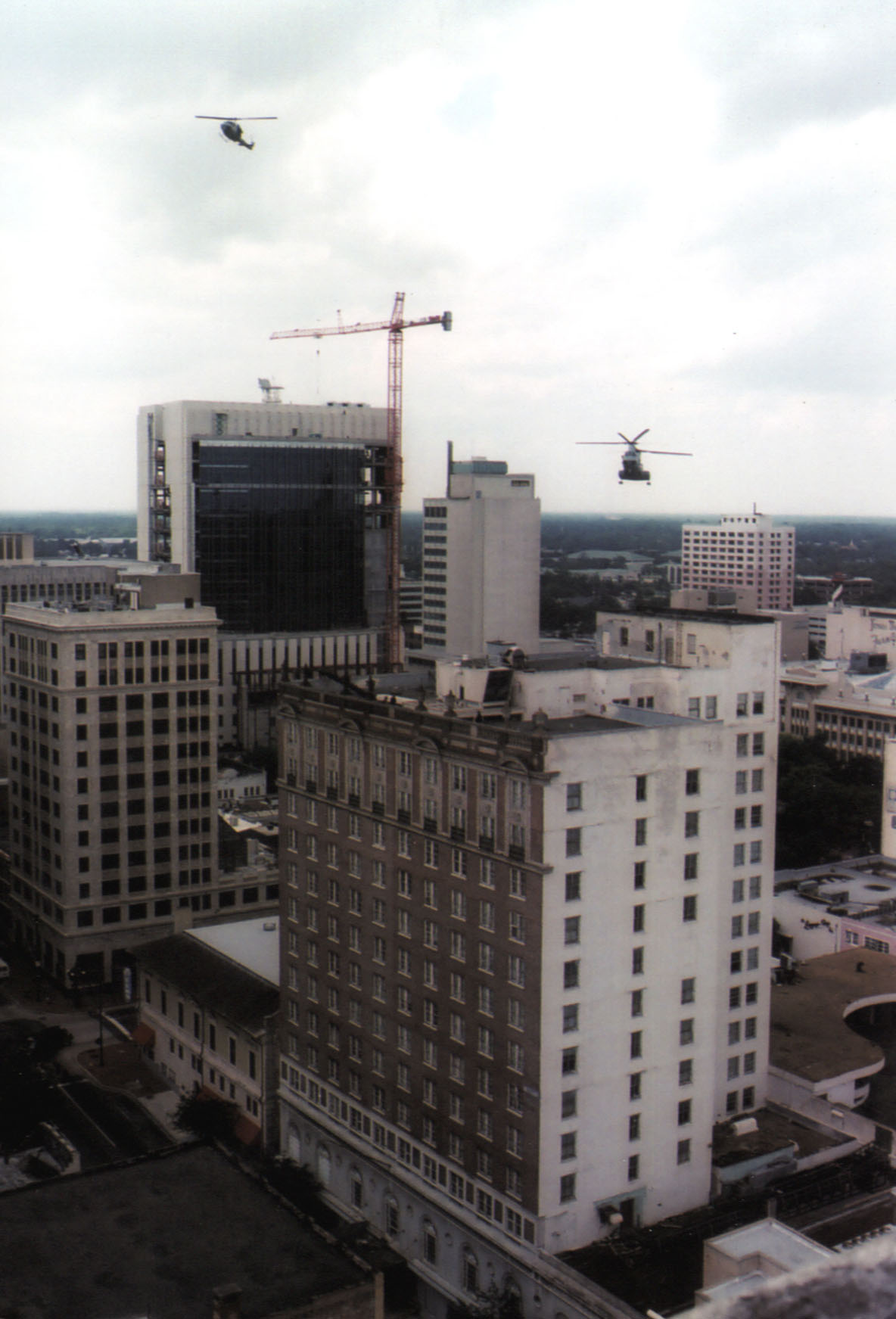
- The Hotel Roosevelt (in the foreground), in a 2001 Navy publication.
- Date: December 29, 1963
- Location: Jacksonville, Florida
- Type: Fire
- Cause: Faulty wires
- Deaths: 22

The Hotel Roosevelt fire on December 29, 1963, was the worst fire in Jacksonville, Florida, since the Great Fire of 1901, and it contributed to the worst one-day death toll in the city's history: 22 people died, mostly from carbon monoxide poisoning.

At the time, the Hotel Roosevelt was one of two luxury hotels in the city's downtown, with many restaurants and businesses on its ground floor, including a ballroom and a barber shop. At the end of each year, the Hotel Roosevelt hosted hundreds of travelers who came to attend the Gator Bowl.

== Fire and evacuation ==
The fire started in the ballroom's ceiling. The old ceiling, which was deemed a fire hazard, was not removed when the new ceiling was installed, providing kindling for the fire, which started from faulty wires.

The first call to the Jacksonville Fire Department was made at 7:45 a.m., by hotel doorman Alton Joseph Crowden. Smoke was traveling through the 13-story building, and hotel visitors climbed out of the smoky building with the help of other patrons and bedsheets tied together. For some who saw that fire department ladders would not reach them, guests threw mattresses to the ground in an attempt to soften the landing. Guests were warned not to jump by a county patrol officer, who drove on the sidewalk and used his microphone to broadcast; "Don't jump. The firemen are coming to get you."

Mayor W. Haydon Burns immediately called for assistance from the U.S. Navy, and eight helicopters flew to downtown from Cecil Field and NAS Jacksonville. The airmen helped the patrons exit the building, and transported them to a nearby parking lot, where ambulances were waiting.

The fire was extinguished by 9:30 a.m., and it was estimated that nearly 475 people were saved from the burning building.

== Victims ==
After a day of recovering dead, firefighters found 20 residents dead in bed from smoke inhalation. A woman died after attempting to climb to safety from her 11th floor room, but slipped while on a rope she made from bedsheets. In addition, assistant chief J.R. Romedy collapsed of a heart attack during initial rescue efforts and died at the scene.

=== Notable survivors ===
Survivors of the fire included 1964 Miss America Donna Axum, Manhattan Jaspers basketball coach Ken Norton, and Florida Gators basketball coach Norm Sloan.

== Aftermath ==
Immediately after the fire many local Jacksonville residents, churches and businesses took in displaced hotel guests, and provided food and clothes to those displaced.

Property damage to the Hotel Roosevelt was immense, and the hotel was closed in 1964, with most of the hotel's businesses and staff relocating to the equally upscale Hotel George Washington. After much renovation, the building was re-opened as a retirement home and the Jacksonville Regency House, which closed in 1989.

== Legal ==
The city and fire department were cleared of liability in nearly 40 lawsuits, which were seeking $10 million in damages related to the fire. The ruling by Circuit Judge Marion Gooding, left Hotel Roosevelt Inc and the fire insurer U.S. Fidelity and Guarantee Co. as the targets for damage claims in the fire, and not the city and the insurance company.

== Memorials ==
The former Hotel Roosevelt, located on Adams Street in downtown, is still standing. The building was placed in the National Register of Historic Places in February 1991. Memorials are still held to remember those who died in the fire; the most recent gathering occurred in December 2003, for the 40th anniversary of the blaze. The building was renovated in recent years and is now known as The Carling, an upscale apartment residence.
