= 11 East Forsyth =

- U.S. National Register of Historic Places
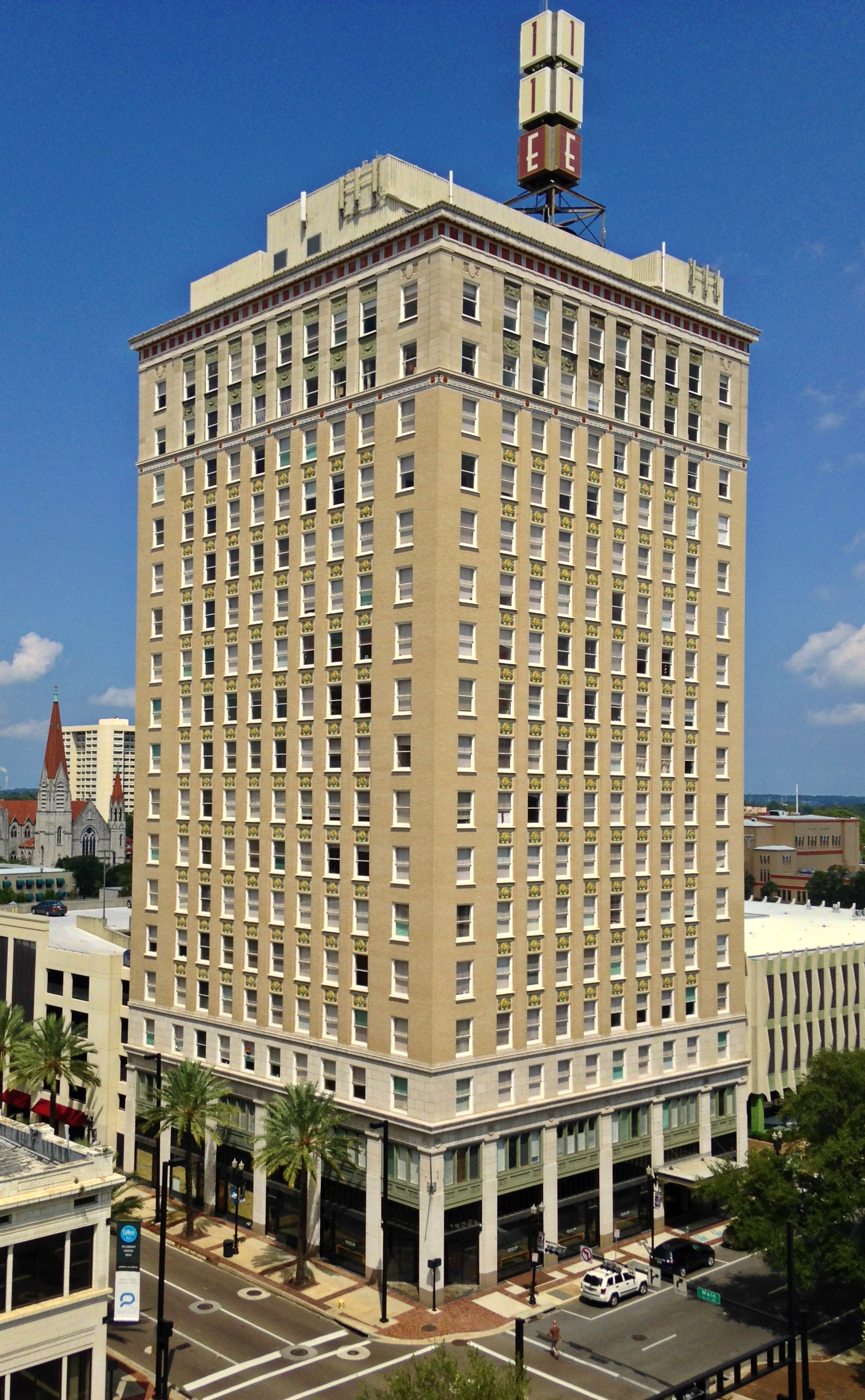

- Location within Florida Location within the United States
- Location: Jacksonville, Florida, USA
- Coordinates: 30°19′37″N 81°39′27″W
- Area: less than one acre
- Built: 1926
- Architect: Pringle & Smith
- Architectural style: Chicago school
- MPS: Downtown Jacksonville MPS
- NRHP reference No.: 03001310
- Added to NRHP: December 23, 2003

11 East Forsyth, formerly known as the Lynch Building and the American Heritage Life Building, is a historic structure in Jacksonville, Florida. Originally developed by Stephen Andrew Lynch, as its current name suggests, it is located at 11 East Forsyth Street in Downtown Jacksonville. On December 23, 2003, it was added to the U.S. National Register of Historic Places.

Vestcor invested more than $24 million to restore the building's exterior and transform the former offices into loft apartments, which tenants began to occupy during 2003.

== Construction ==
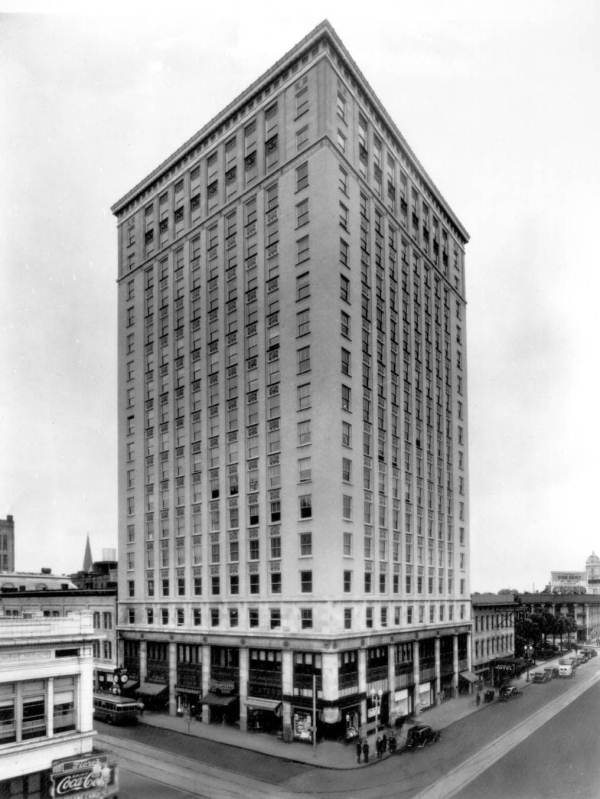
Lynch Building in 1938.

The 17-story, 153,000 sq ft (14,200 m^{2}) building originally contained commercial offices and was opened by entrepreneur and film pioneer Stephen Andrew Lynch. It was designed by architects Pringle & Smith in 1926 in the Chicago School style. It was constructed with limestone, marble and a facade of brick; the top of the structure contained a capital of terra-cotta. When it opened in 1926, it was Jacksonville's second tallest building, one floor less than the Barnett National Bank Building.

The building was renovated in 1962 and renamed the American Heritage Life Building when it was utilized as home office of the American Heritage Life Insurance Company. When the company built a new headquarters and left the downtown during the late 1980s, the structure was unoccupied for many years.

== Current use ==
Jacksonville developer Vestcor began a historic preservation of the building in 2002 after obtaining a $17.8 million, 1.5% interest, 20-year loan from the city of Jacksonville. The company restored many architectural features including polychromatic terra-cotta panels, decorative ceilings and steel panels. Elevators, HVAC, electrical, plumbing and other infrastructure was modernized and a six-story parking garage was constructed adjacent to the building. The second floor was converted into a large community club room, a fitness center and a media room. Modern amenities were added while respecting the historic integrity of the structure. The building was renamed to "11 East Forsyth" and 127 apartments were opened in 2003 after $24 million and a year of construction. A Starbucks coffee bistro opened, but subsequently closed, leaving no tenants in the 4,500 sq ft (420 m^{2}) of first-floor commercial space.

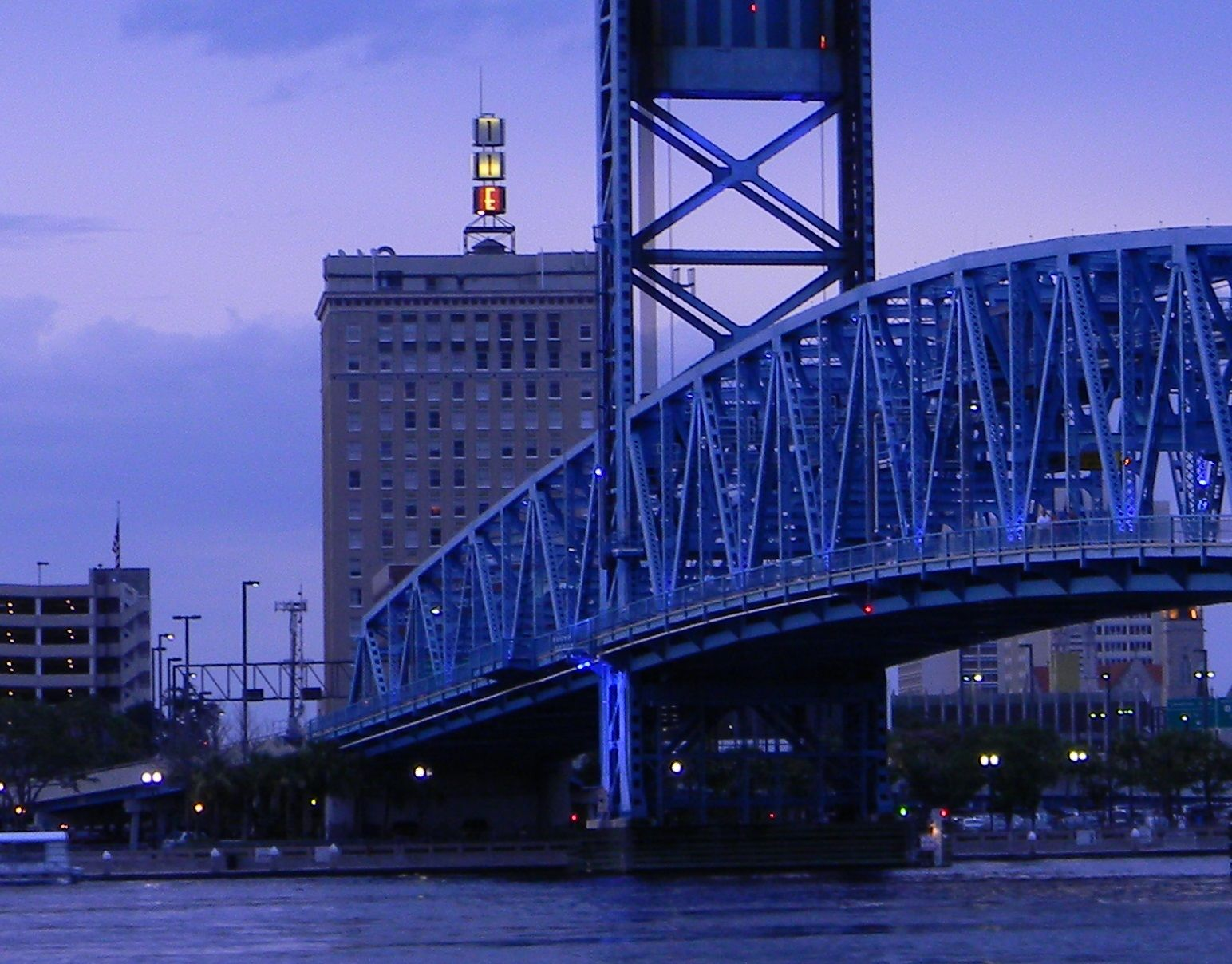
Lynch Building & Main Street Bridge

In late December 2009, Vestcor requested a modification to their loan terms, citing three years of operating losses at 11 East and their other renovated building, The Carling. The company asked for three years of interest-only payments plus low interest loans to potential tenants for the empty commercial space at 11 East. Three months later, the city approved the plan for principal deferral but took no action on tenant loans.

== See also ==
- Architecture of Jacksonville
