= One Biscayne Tower =

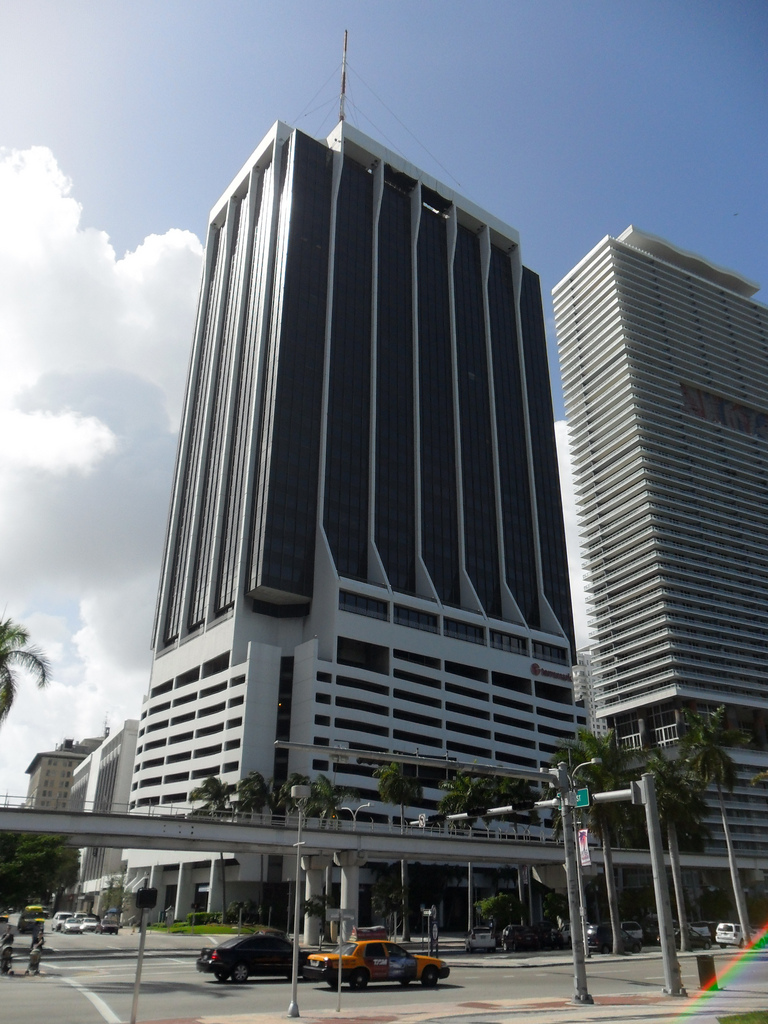
- One Biscayne Tower
- Interactive map of the One Biscayne Tower area

General information
- Status: Completed
- Type: Office
- Location: 2 South Biscayne Boulevard, Miami, Florida, United States
- Coordinates: 25.773984°N 80.187989°W
- Construction started: 1969
- Completed: 1972
- Opening: 1972

Height
- Roof: 492 ft (150 m)

Technical details
- Floor count: 39
- Floor area: 619,678 sq ft (57,570.0 m^{2})

Design and construction
- Architects: Humberto P. Alonso, Pelayo G. Fraga & Associates E.H. Gutierrez & Associates

Website
- onebiscaynetower.com

One Biscayne Tower is an office skyscraper in Miami, Florida, United States. It is located on the eastern edge of Downtown Miami, on South Biscayne Boulevard. It comprises Class A office space completely. The office tower was acquired by CP Group in 2021 in a joint venture with Rialto Capital Management. The approximately 983,000 square feet building contains 39 floors and is 492 ft (150 m) tall, to the roof. The 200-foot (61 m) antenna mast on top of the building raises its total height, including antenna, to nearly 700 feet (210 m).

When built in 1972, it ended the Dade County Courthouse's 44-year reign as the tallest building in Miami. It held this status until the Southeast Financial Center was topped off in 1984. The building, although relatively short compared to many of the newer skyscrapers in Miami, remains a symbol of the city. It appears often on most postcards of the skyline and remains a signature building of Miami, due to its being a symbol of prosperity for the Cuban exile community. For just this reason, it appears in a July 1973 article of National Geographic titled, "Cuba's Exiles Bring New Life to Miami." The building itself was designed by the exiled Cuban architects Humberto P. Alonso, Pelayo G. Fraga & Associates and E.H. Gutierrez & Associates. For their design, the architects received a 1973 Outstanding Concrete Structure in Florida award.

One Biscayne Tower has won five Office Building of the Year (TOBY) Awards, including the 2007 Miami-Dade TOBY Award and the 2007 BOMA Southern Regional TOBY.

== Gallery ==
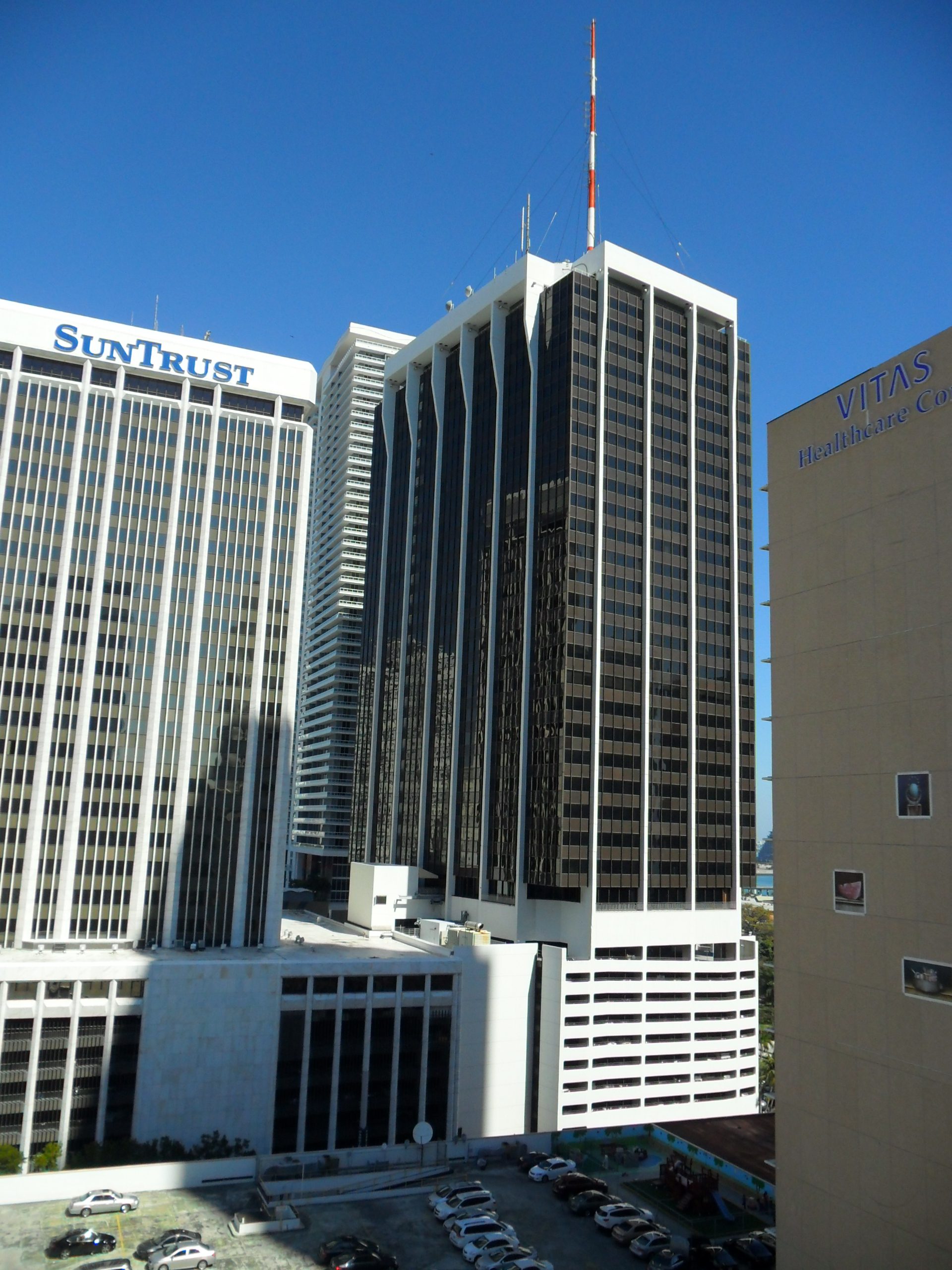
One Biscayne Tower from the Southeast Financial Center parking annex

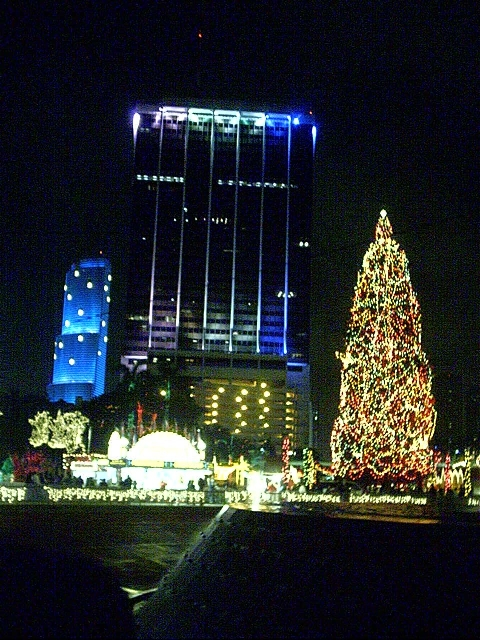
One Biscayne Tower at night during Christmas season 2002. The Christmas tree shown at the time was the tallest one in the United States

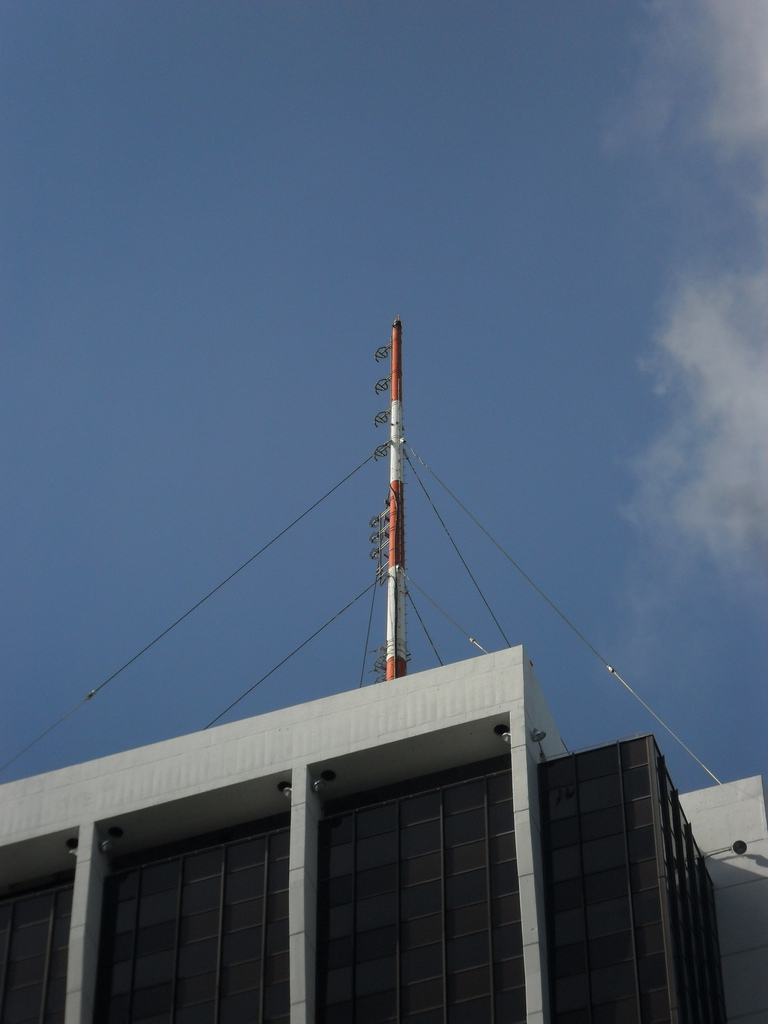
Close up of the antenna mast on One Biscayne Tower

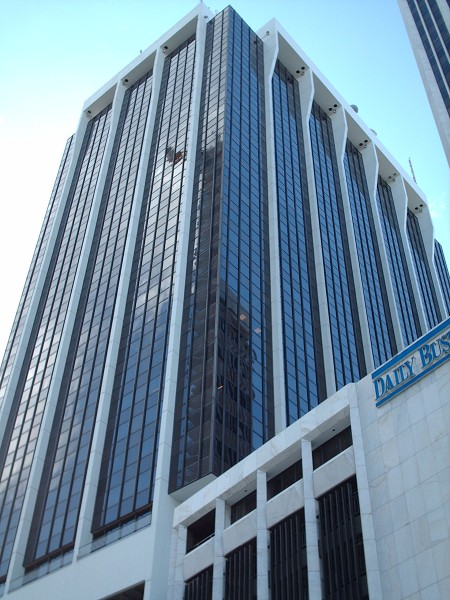
View from East Flagler Street

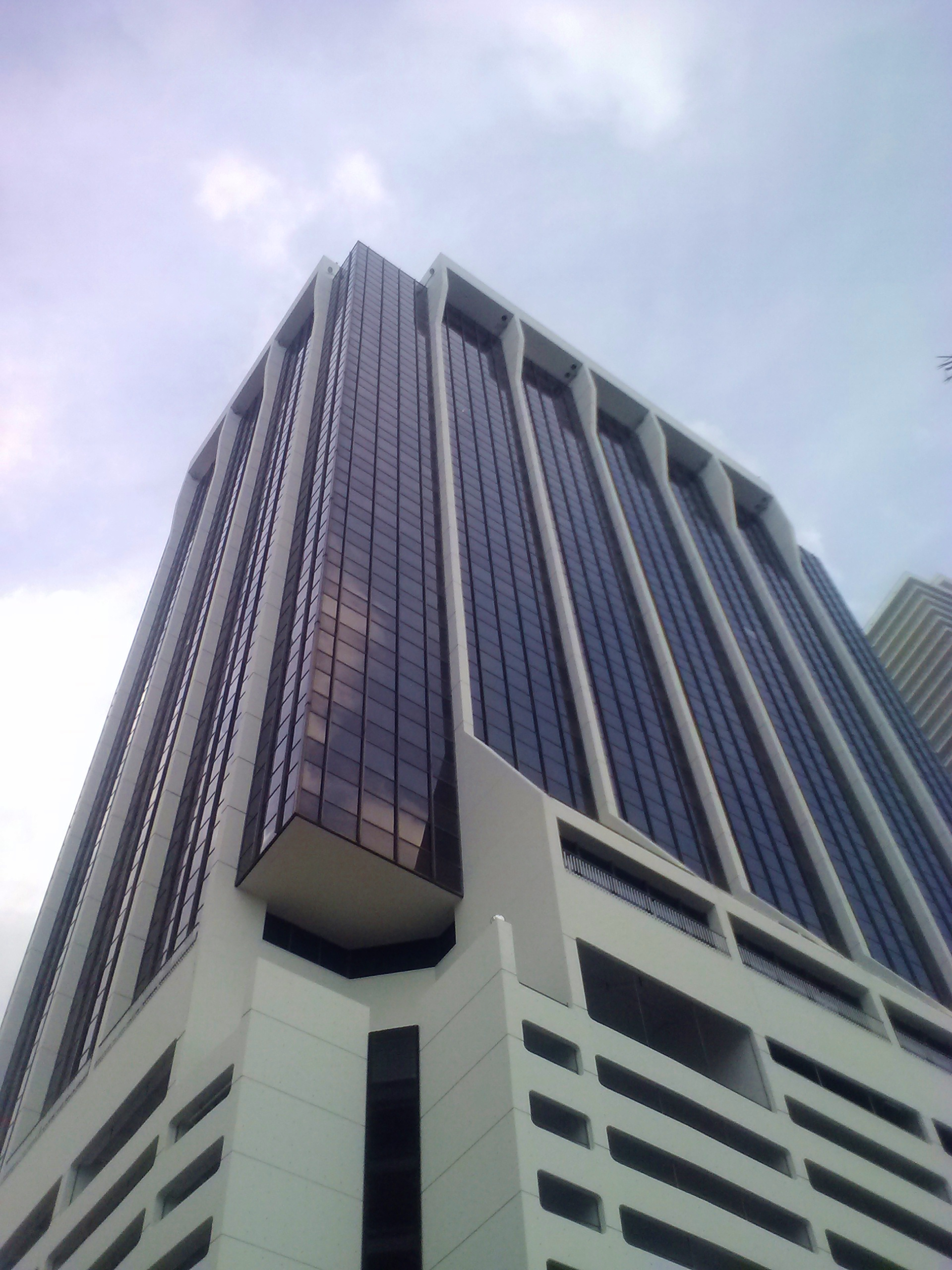
Facade

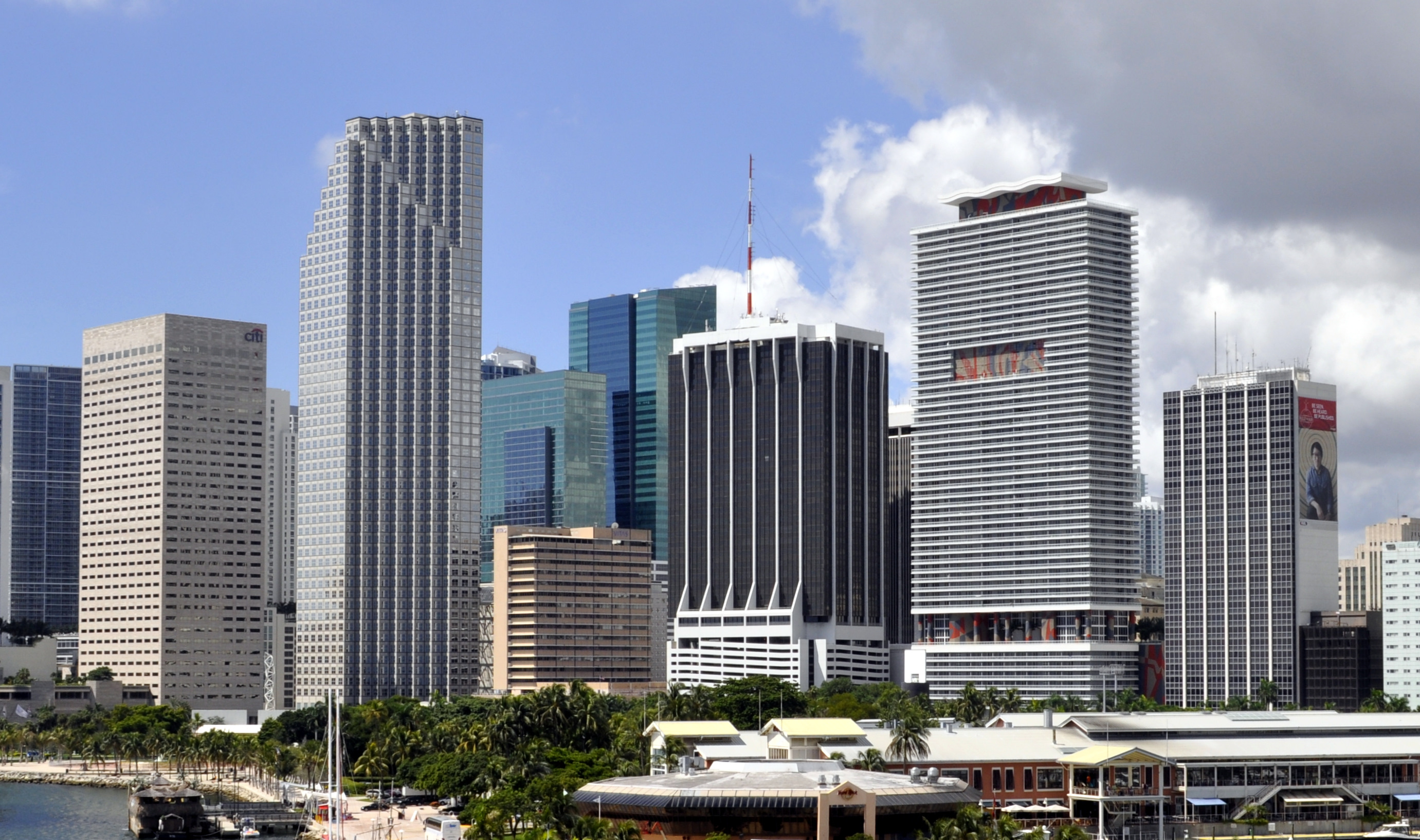
The building appears front and center in the traditional establishing shot of Miami.

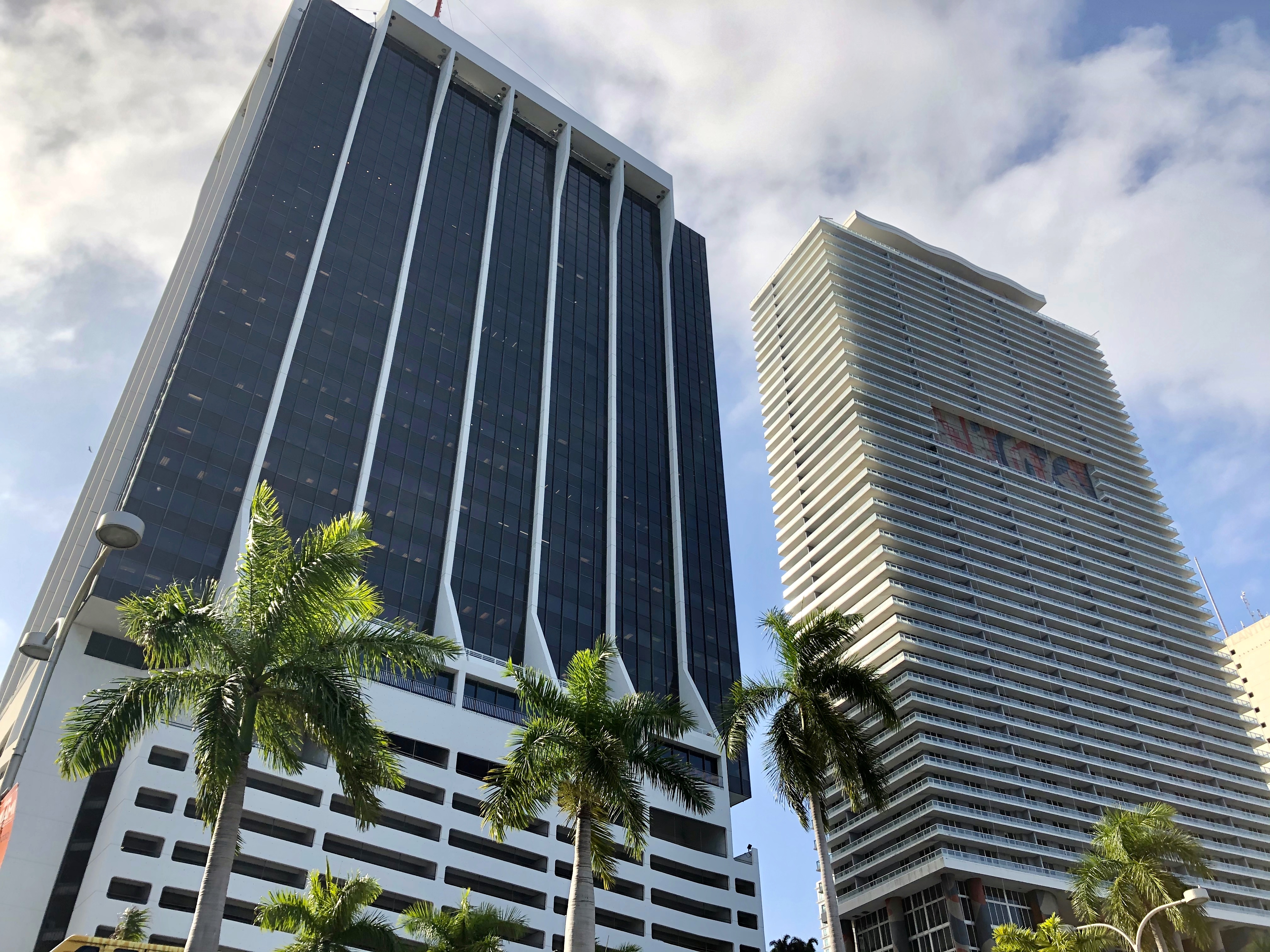
One Biscayne Tower with 50 Biscayne in February 2020

== See also ==
- List of tallest buildings in Miami

Records
Preceded by Miami-Dade County Courthouse	Tallest Building in Miami; 1972–1984; 150m	Succeeded by Southeast Financial Center
