= The Carling =

- U.S. National Register of Historic Places
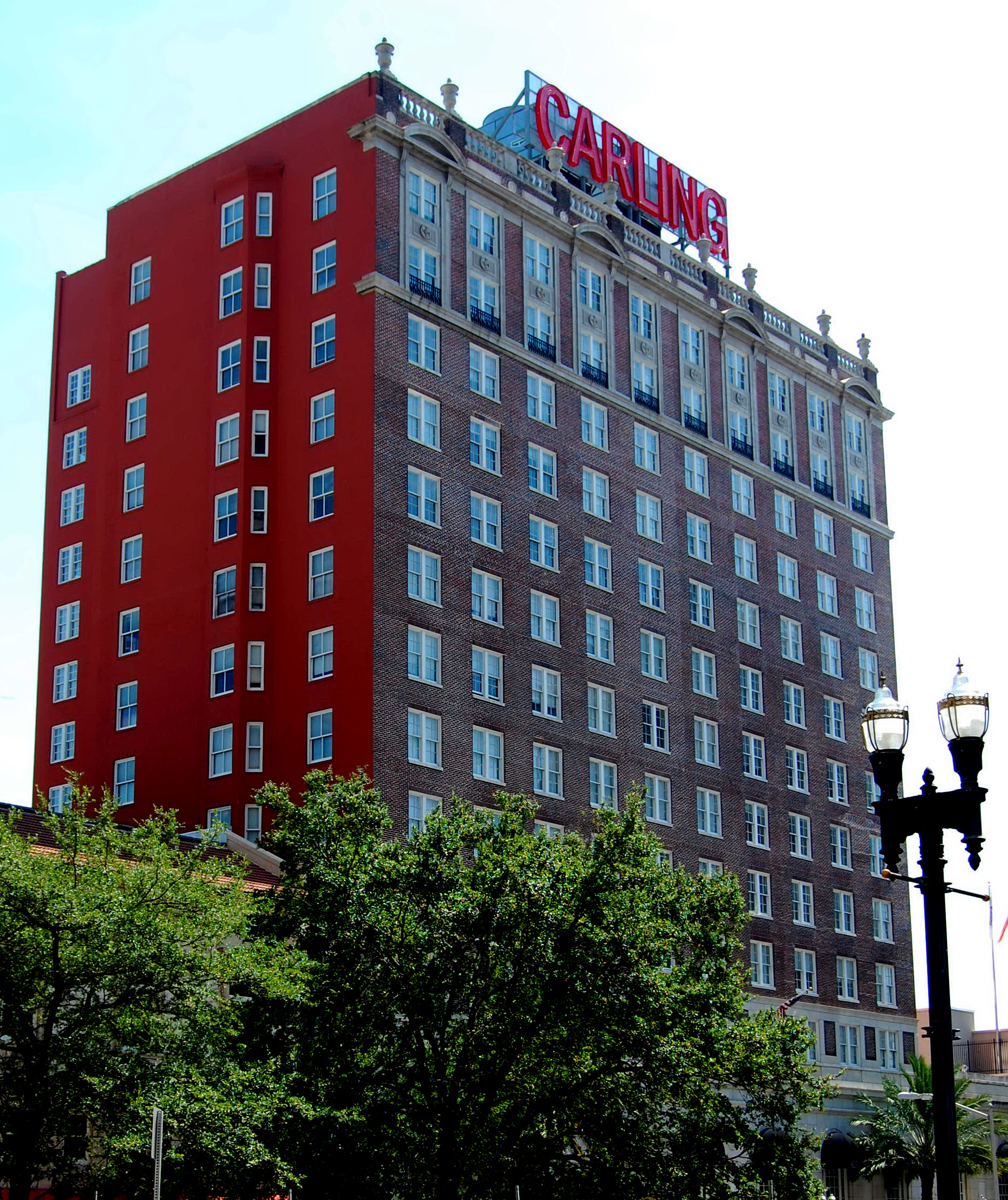

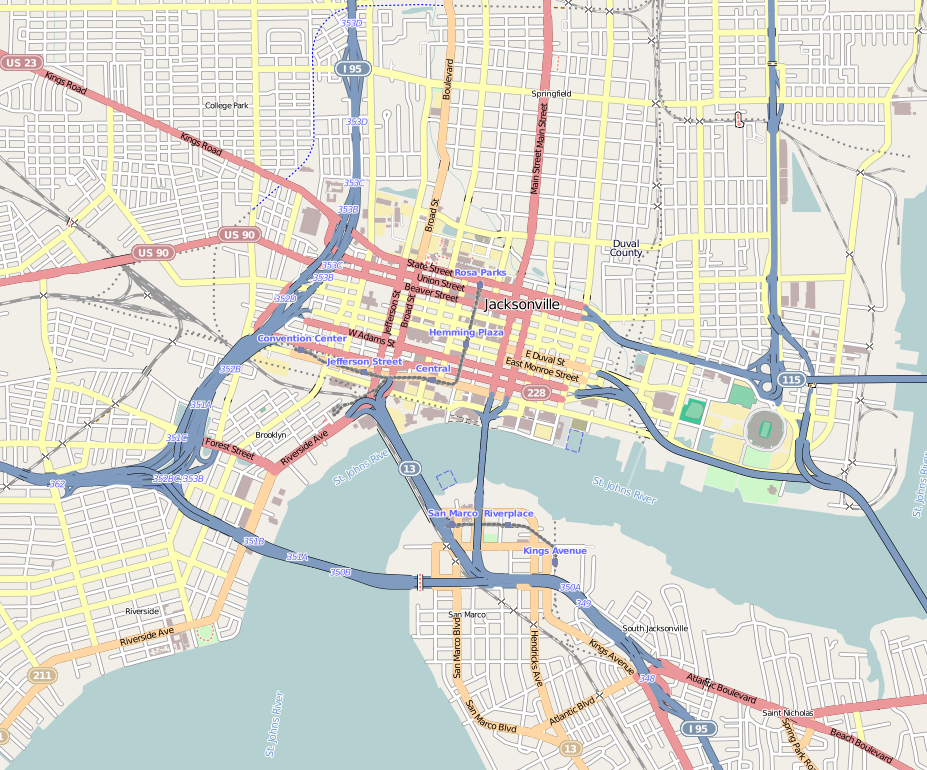
- Location within Central Jacksonville Location within Florida
- Location: Jacksonville, Florida, USA
- Coordinates: 30°19′42″N 81°39′29″W
- Area: Duval County
- Built: 1925
- Architect: Thompson, Holmes & Converse
- Architectural style: Late 19th And 20th Century Revivals
- NRHP reference No.: 91000225
- Added to NRHP: February 28, 1991

The Carling, formerly known as the Carling Hotel and Hotel Roosevelt, is a historic building in Jacksonville, Florida, United States built in 1925. It is located at 31 West Adams Street in Downtown Jacksonville. As its former names indicates it was originally a hotel, and was used for that purpose until 1964; it currently serves as a residential building.

== Construction ==
The 13-story building originally contained 335 rooms and was designed by noted New York City architects Thompson, Holmes & Converse in 1925 and held in Italian Renaissance style. A newspaper story depicted it as "300 rooms with bath, running ice water, fans and the latest equipment in the rooms. The three lower stories are faced with Indiana limestone above which is a shaft of red brick. The upper stories are trimmed with terra-cotta, and surmounted by a balustrade with limestone coping. The building is of completely fireproof construction." When it opened on September 1, 1926, it was one of Jacksonville's finest hotels.

Placement of the building was unusual at the time because it was situated in the middle of a block, rather than on a corner. It was constructed and managed by Atlanta's Dinkler Hotel Company, which owned and operated nearly two dozen upscale hotels in the southeastern United States. The facility was named after Carling L. Dinkler, who claimed to be the youngest hotel executive in the U.S.

== History ==
The facility changed its name to the Hotel Roosevelt in 1936 and it was a downtown landmark for over a quarter century. A two-story addition was constructed in 1937 at the rear of the building which permits access from Monroe Street.

It was the site of the catastrophic Hotel Roosevelt fire in late December 1963, which claimed 22 lives and caused in excess of $350,000 in damage, forcing the hotel to close in 1964.

After being vacant for nearly 20 years, the structure was turned into apartments for retirees called Jacksonville Regency House, but that operation ended in 1989.

On February 28, 1991, the site was added to the U.S. National Register of Historic Places, but the building remained shuttered for almost 14 years. Little or no work was performed on the building's major components for almost 40 years; the structure's infrastructure was outdated with leaks and rot throughout.

== Current use ==
Jacksonville developer Vestcor began a historic preservation of the Carling in 2003 after obtaining a $16.5 million, 1.4% interest, 20-year loan and $5 million in grants, both from the city of Jacksonville. The company restored many architectural features which included Palladian windows, terrazzo floors, and the dual grand marble staircases leading from the lobby to what was the ballroom on the second level. Elevators, HVAC, electrical, plumbing and other infrastructure was modernized and a 237-space parking garage was constructed adjacent to the Carling. The ballroom was converted into a large community club room, a fitness center and a media room. Modern amenities were added while respecting the historic integrity of the structure. The building was renamed The Carling, and its 100 apartments were opened in July 2005 after $29 million and 20 months of construction. Vestor began leasing space in the Carling's 15,000 sq ft (1,400 m^{2}) commercial arcade in October 2007. Since then, a gallery known as "The Art Center Cooperative, Inc." and a barber shop opened in the complex.

In late December 2009, Vestcor requested a modification to their loan terms, citing three years of operating losses on the Carling and their other renovated building, 11 East Forsyth. The company asked for three years of interest-only payments plus low interest loans to potential tenants for the mostly empty commercial space in their buildings. Three months later, the city approved the plan for principal deferral but took no action on tenant loans.

== See also ==
- Architecture of Jacksonville
- List of tallest buildings in Jacksonville
