= Y. Frank Freeman =

American film studio executive

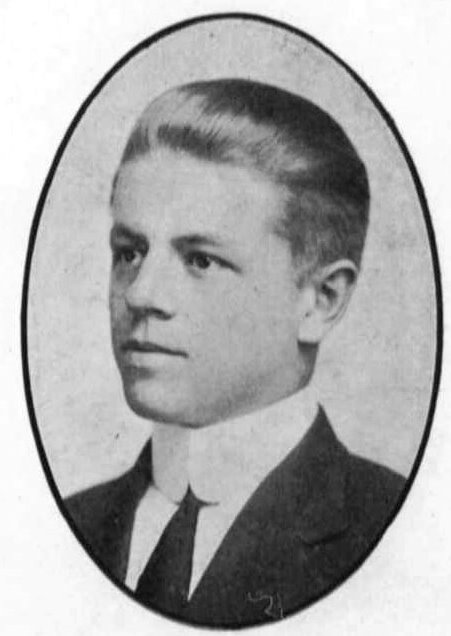
Y. Frank Freeman circa 1910

Young Frank Freeman (14 December 1890 – 5 February 1969) was studio head at Paramount Pictures from 1938 to 1959. In addition to his work with Paramount, he also worked in the fields of banking, real estate, higher education, and athletics.

== Early life and education ==
Freeman was born in Greenville, Georgia, as the second child and first son of Young Frank Freeman, a cotton farmer and merchant, and Mary, née Thrash. He graduated from the Georgia Institute of Technology in 1910.

== Career ==
He set up a telephone company in Ocilla, Georgia but sold out in 1912 to take over his father's business. He married Margaret Harris in 1913 and after struggling in the cotton industry for three years, they moved to Fitzgerald, Georgia where he worked for his father-in-law who owned properties, including the Amusu Theatre. Freeman operated the theatre for six months and gained an interest in the film industry.

He joined S.A. Lynch in Atlanta who were building a theater circuit and became general sales manager in 1916. He later moved to New York but returned to Atlanta as vice president and general manager of Southern Enterprises, a theater chain co-owned by Lynch and Paramount. In 1922, Paramount bought out Lynch's theater interests and Freeman joined Lynch's real estate operations in Georgia and Florida.

In 1932, he joined Paramount in New York to oversee their real estate holdings. He rose through Paramount's ranks and in 1934 took over their theater operations. In 1935, he was elected vice president in charge of theater operations and by 1938 he had been persuaded to move to Hollywood and had been named vice president in charge of studio operations. He remained in this role until 1959. He retired from Paramount on January 1, 1967. Variety called him an "effective organizer and administrator, with a reputation of personal and business integrity." His secretary, Alice Marchak, described him as "a bit pushy" but "didn't find him to be cruel or anything"; after a disagreement where Freeman wanted all his staff to donate to a charity fundraiser and Marchak declined, having other charitable commitments including her church, she recounted "He didn’t retaliate against me, but he never spoke with me again. We’d walk by each other and he wouldn’t say anything.".

He was president of the Association of Motion Picture Producers from 1940 to 1944 and chairman in 1947–48. He was also chairman of the Motion Picture Research Council and three term campaign chairman and president of the Motion Picture Permanent Charities Committee and also a fundraiser for the Motion Picture Relief Fund.

He was a governor of the Academy of Motion Pictures Arts and Sciences and was the first winner of their Jean Hersholt Humanitarian Award in 1957, for his charitable work.

He was a member of the board of trustees for Georgia Tech for six years after graduation and received a distinguished service medal. He was also a trustee at the University of Southern California. He was also chairman of LA Bureau of the Federal Reserve Board from 1944 to 1947 and deputy chairman in San Francisco in 1954–55. Freeman supported Thomas Dewey in the 1944 United States presidential election.

He was awarded a star on the Hollywood Walk of Fame on February 8, 1960.

He died at the Good Samaritan Hospital in Los Angeles and was buried at Westview Cemetery in Atlanta.

== Personal life ==
In 1913, Freeman married Margaret Harris, daughter of a Fitzgerald, Georgia property owner. Their son, Y. Frank Freeman Jr. (1916-1962), was a movie producer at Paramount during the 1950s but died in 1962.
