= Star system (filmmaking) =

Method of creating, promoting, and exploiting film stars

The star system was the method of creating, promoting, and exploiting stars in Hollywood films from the 1920s until the 1960s. Movie studios selected promising young actors and glamorised and created personas for them, often inventing new names and even new backgrounds. Examples of stars who went through the star system include Cary Grant (born Archibald Leach), Joan Crawford (born Lucille Fay LeSueur), and Rock Hudson (born Roy Harold Scherer, Jr.).

The star system put an emphasis on the image rather than the acting, although discreet acting, voice, and dancing lessons were a common part of the regimen. Women were expected to behave like ladies, and were never to leave the house without makeup and stylish clothes. Men were expected to be seen in public as gentlemen. Morality clauses were a common part of actors' studio contracts.

Studio executives, public relations staffs, and agents worked together with the actor to create a star persona and cover up incidents or lifestyles that would damage the star's public image. It was common, for example, to arrange sham dates between single (male) stars and starlets to generate publicity. Tabloids and gossip columnists were tipped off, and photographers were around to capture the supposedly romantic moment. Tabloids reported stars' drug use, drinking problems, divorce, or adultery.

== Beginnings ==
In the early years of the cinema (1890s–1900s), performers were not identified in films. There are two main reasons for this. First, from the perspective of actors who were trained in the theatre, they were embarrassed to be working in film and feared it would ruin their reputation. Silent film was thought of as mere pantomime and one of theatre actors' main skills was the command of their voice.

Thomas Edison and the Motion Picture Patents Company (MPPC) forced filmmakers to use their equipment and follow their rules, since they owned the patents of much of the motion picture equipment. The MPPC frowned on star promotion, although, according to research done by Janet Staiger, the MPPC did promote some stars around this time.

The main catalyst for change was the public's desire to know the actors' names. Film audiences repeatedly recognized certain performers in movies that they liked. Since they did not know the performers' names they gave them nicknames (such as "the Biograph Girl", Florence Lawrence, who was featured in Biograph movies). Audiences began to want movie stars.

Producer Carl Laemmle, who worked on 400 movies between 1909 and 1939, promoted some movie stars. He was independent of the MPPC and used star promotion to fight the MPPC's control. Laemmle acquired Lawrence from Biograph. He spread a rumor that she had been killed in a streetcar crash. Then he combated this rumor by saying that she was doing fine and would be starring in an up-coming movie produced by his company, the Independent Moving Pictures Company (IMP).

The development of film fan magazines gave fans knowledge about the actors outside of their film roles. Motion Picture Story Magazine (1911–1977) and Photoplay were initially focused on movies' stories, but soon found that more copies could be sold if they emphasized the actors.

Also, precedents set by legitimate theater encouraged film to emulate the star system of the Broadway stage. Broadway stars in the late 19th century were treated much like film stars came to be treated by the middle of the 20th century. The main practitioner of the star system on Broadway was Charles Frohman, a man whom Zukor, Lasky, Goldwyn, Laemmle, Mayer, Fox and the Warner Brothers emulated and who later perished in the Lusitania sinking.

Moreover, the star system existed in forms of entertainment before the cinema and may be tracked back at least to P. T. Barnum in the mid 19th century, who developed a system of promotion for his "Museum of Freaks" and later his Greatest Show on Earth circus. Barnum's biggest stars were Jenny Lind, Tom Thumb and Jumbo.. According to Danish film historian Casper Tybjerg, Valdemar Psilander was one of the world's first and biggest movie stars.

== Decline of the star system ==
From the 1930s to the 1960s, it was common practice for studios to arrange the contractual exchange of talent (directors, actors) for prestige pictures. The star system found new stars such as Marilyn Monroe, Marlon Brando, and James Dean. Stars would sometimes pursue these swaps themselves. Stars were becoming selective. Although punished and frowned upon by studio heads, several strong-willed stars refused parts that they were assigned, on the belief that they knew better than the studio heads what parts were right for them. In one instance, Jane Greer negotiated her contract out of Howard Hawks' hands over the roles she felt were inappropriate for her. Olivia de Havilland and Bette Davis both sued their studios to be free of their gag orders (Davis lost, de Havilland won). The publicity accompanying these incidents fostered a growing suspicion among actors that a free agent system would be more personally beneficial to them than the suffocating star system. In 1959, Shirley MacLaine sued famed producer Hal Wallis over a contractual dispute, contributing further to the star system's demise. By the 1960s, the star system was in decline.

Throughout the 1960s and 1970s, a more natural style of acting, the Stanislavski Method, became popular. With competition from TV, and entire studios changing hands, the star system faltered and did not recover. The studio system could no longer resist the changes occurring in entertainment, culture, labor, and news; by 1970, the star system had mostly disappeared. However, Universal Studios continued to offer talent contracts (typically for a seven-year period) until 1981–1982.

=== Contemporary stardom ===
The phenomenon of stardom has remained essential to Hollywood because of its ability to lure spectators into the theater. Following the demise of the studio system in the 1950s and 1960s, the star system became the most important stabilizing feature of the movie industry. This is because stars provide film makers with built-in audiences who regularly watch films in which their favorite actors and actresses appear.

Contemporary talent agencies operating in Hollywood must now be licensed under the California Labor Code, which defines an agent as any "person or corporation who engages in the occupation of procuring, offering, promising, or attempting to procure employment for an artist or artists". Talent agencies such as William Morris Agency (WMA, founded 1898) became more prominent in the film industry, and many more started to arise in the mid-1970s, including International Creative Management (ICM), Creative Artists Agency (CAA). CAA created new ways of marketing talent by packaging actors. Agencies are able to influence production schedules, budgeting of the film, and which talent will be playing each particular character.

Star "packaging" gained notoriety in the 1980s and 1990s, with films such as Ghostbusters, Tootsie, Stripes, and A League of Their Own (two of which star Bill Murray). This practice continued to be prominent in films such as Big Daddy, Happy Gilmore, The Waterboy, and Billy Madison (all of which star Adam Sandler). The ease of selling a packaged group of actors to a particular film ensures that certain fan groups will see that movie, reducing risk of failure and increasing profits.

== See also ==
- Classical Hollywood cinema
- Movie star
- Studio system
- Industry Plant
- Typecasting
- James Dean
- Paul Newman
