= 50 Biscayne =

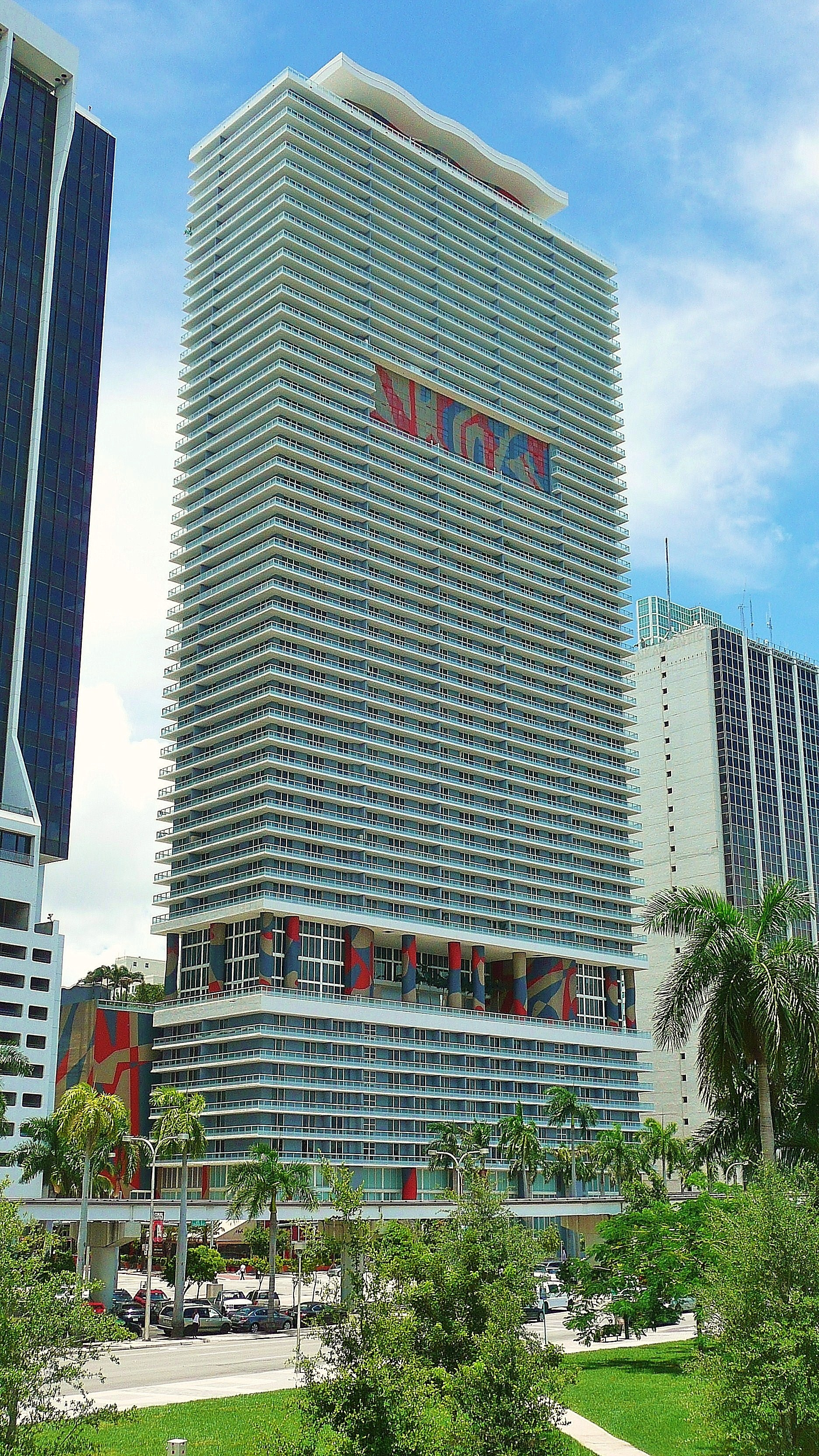
- 50 Biscayne as seem from Bayfront Park with the Metromover in the foreground
- Interactive map of the 50 Biscayne area

General information
- Type: Residential condominiums, retail (street level)
- Location: 50 Biscayne Boulevard, Downtown Miami, Florida; United States
- Coordinates: 25.774921°N 80.18804°W
- Construction started: June 14, 2005
- Completed: 2007
- Opening: November 15, 2007
- Operator: Related Cervera Realty Services (RCRS), Inc.

Height
- Roof: 554 ft (168.9 m)

Technical details
- Floor count: 55
- Lifts/elevators: 5

Design and construction
- Architects: Sieger Suarez Architectural Partnership, Inc. and Rockwell Group, Inc.
- Developer: The Related Group of Florida, Inc.
- Main contractor: LaSalle Bank Corp.

50 Biscayne is a fifty-seven story skyscraper condo in the Central Business District of Downtown Miami, Florida, United States. As its name implies, the tower is located at the address of 50 Biscayne Boulevard in between Flagler and Northeast 1st Streets. The size and stature of 50 Biscayne conceives a significant part of the Biscayne Wall, which is a series of buildings and parks stretching along the Biscayne Bay.

The tower is 554 feet (169 m) tall and contains upscale commercial space at street level, such as Safi and D'Oro Caffe. The tower's main lobby consists of three stories, followed by the Park Suites, which are condos customly furnished by the Rockwell Group, on floors 4 through 9. The two-story tenth and twelfth floors contain hotel-esque amenities available to the tower's residents. Ascending floors contain all condos.

The tower's architecture is based on the Miami Modern (abbreviated as MiMo) style, and has many design features that pay tribute to landscape architect Roberto Burle Marx's emphasis on natural aesthetics seen along the bay. The site where 50 Biscayne stands today was formerly home to the Columbus Bazaar, a shopping mall which replaced The Hotel McAllister and the Columbus Hotel in a quick fix effort to reutilize the land when both establishments closed for business. The McAllister Hotel was considered one of the city's earliest high-rises when constructed in 1917, while the taller Columbus Hotel sported a top story restaurant (called Top O' The Columbus) and retail arcade.

== Gallery ==
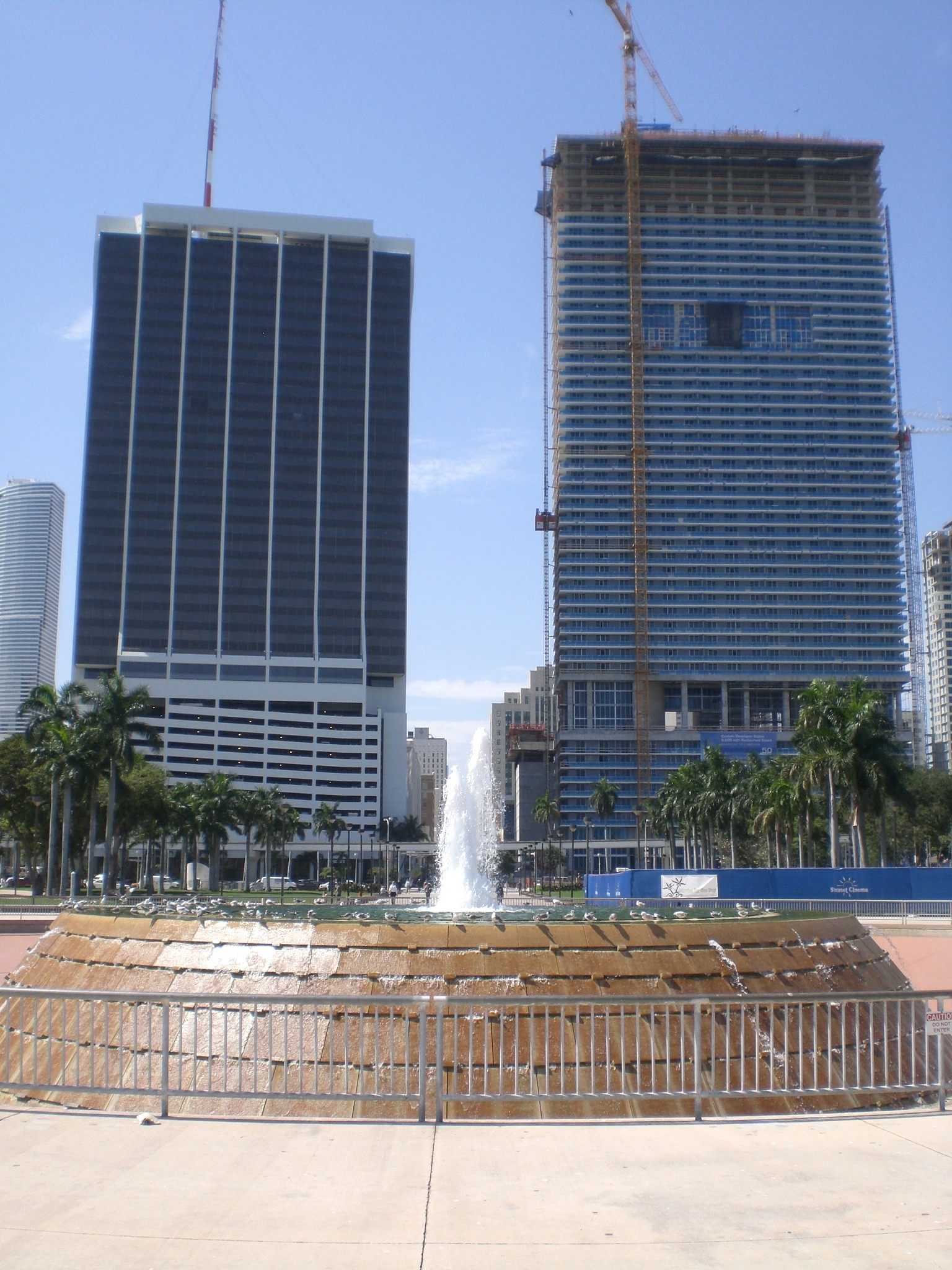
50 Biscayne while under construction in early 2007, left is the One Biscayne Tower

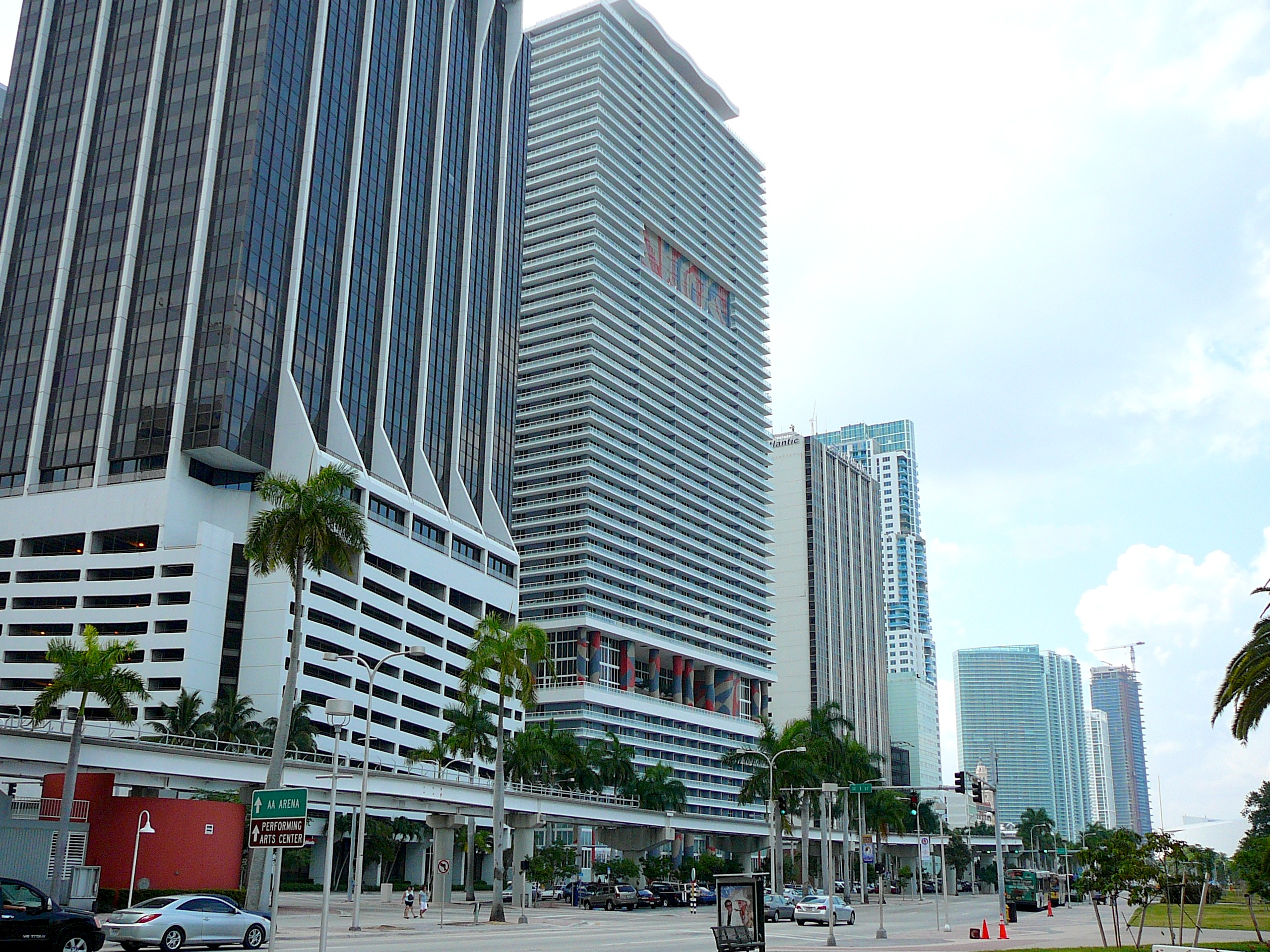
50 Biscayne and neighboring skyscrapers along the Biscayne Wall

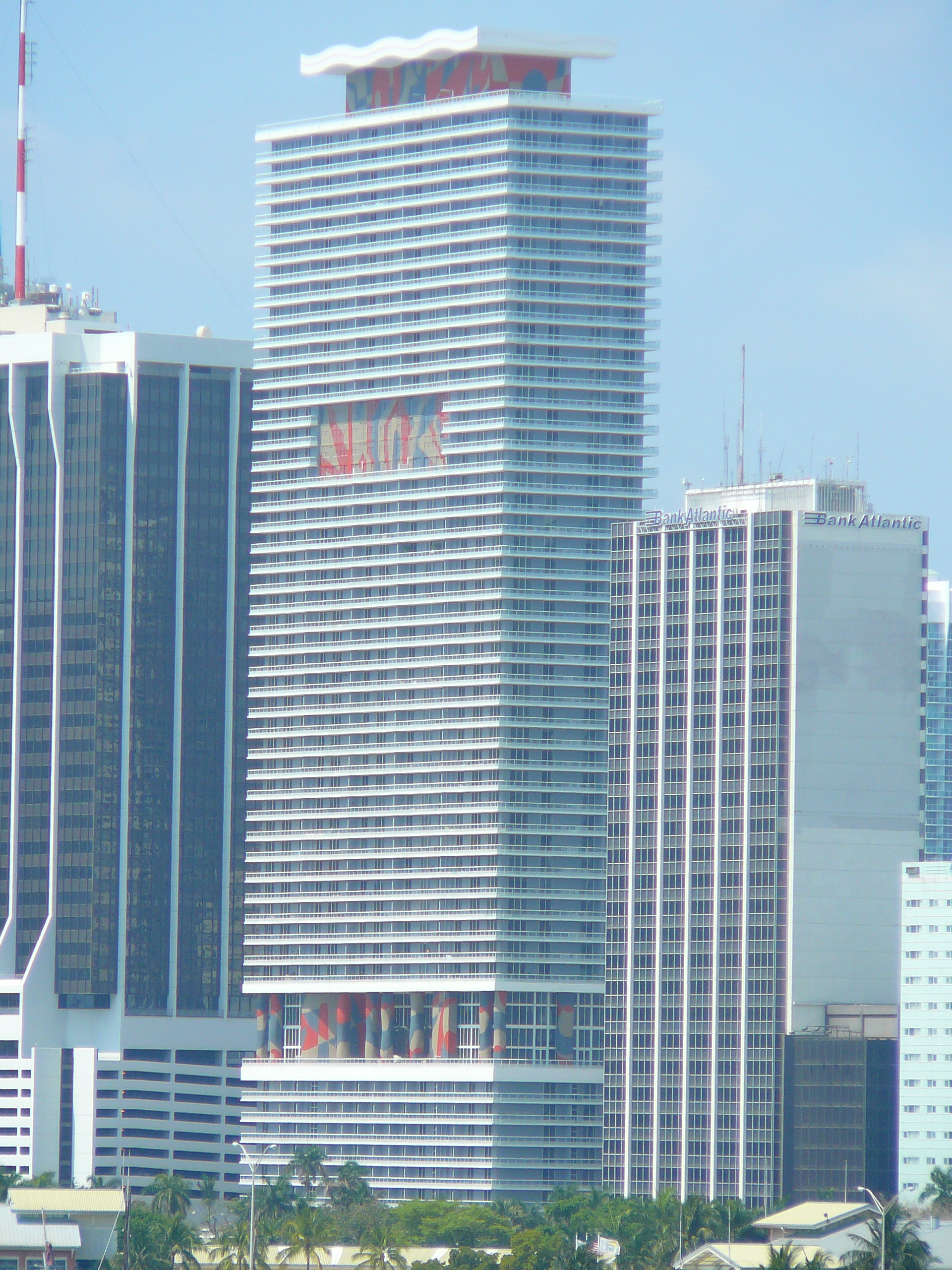
Seen from the bay along with the New World Tower

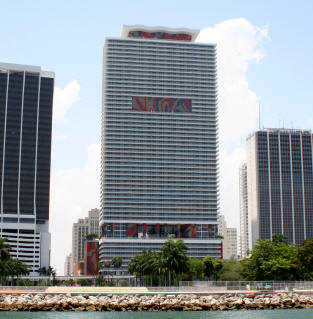
Seen from Bayfront Park

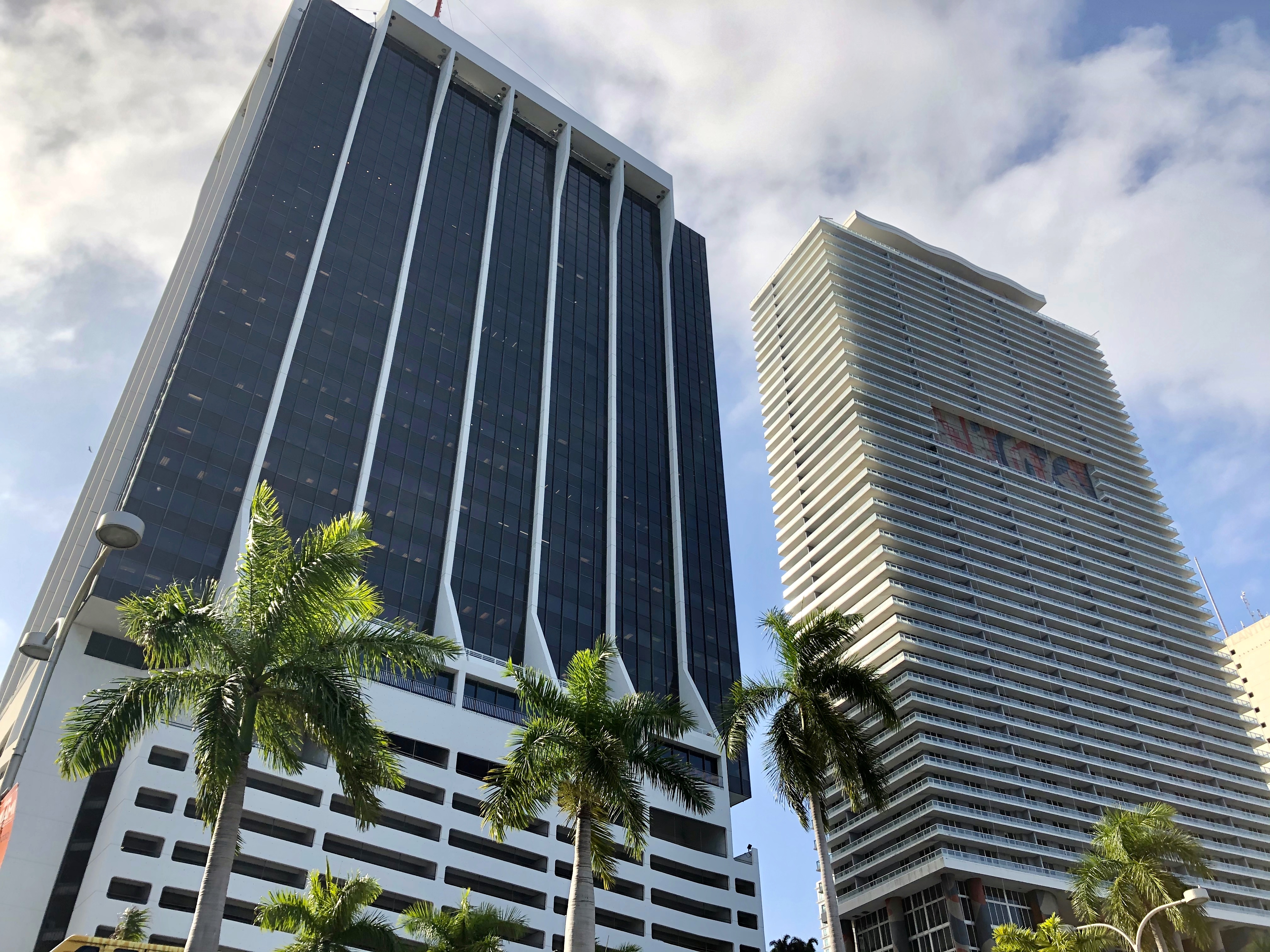
50 Biscayne with One Biscayne Tower in February 2020

== See also ==
- List of tallest buildings in Miami
- List of tallest buildings in Florida
