= Block booking =

Historical practice of selling multiple films to a theater as a unit

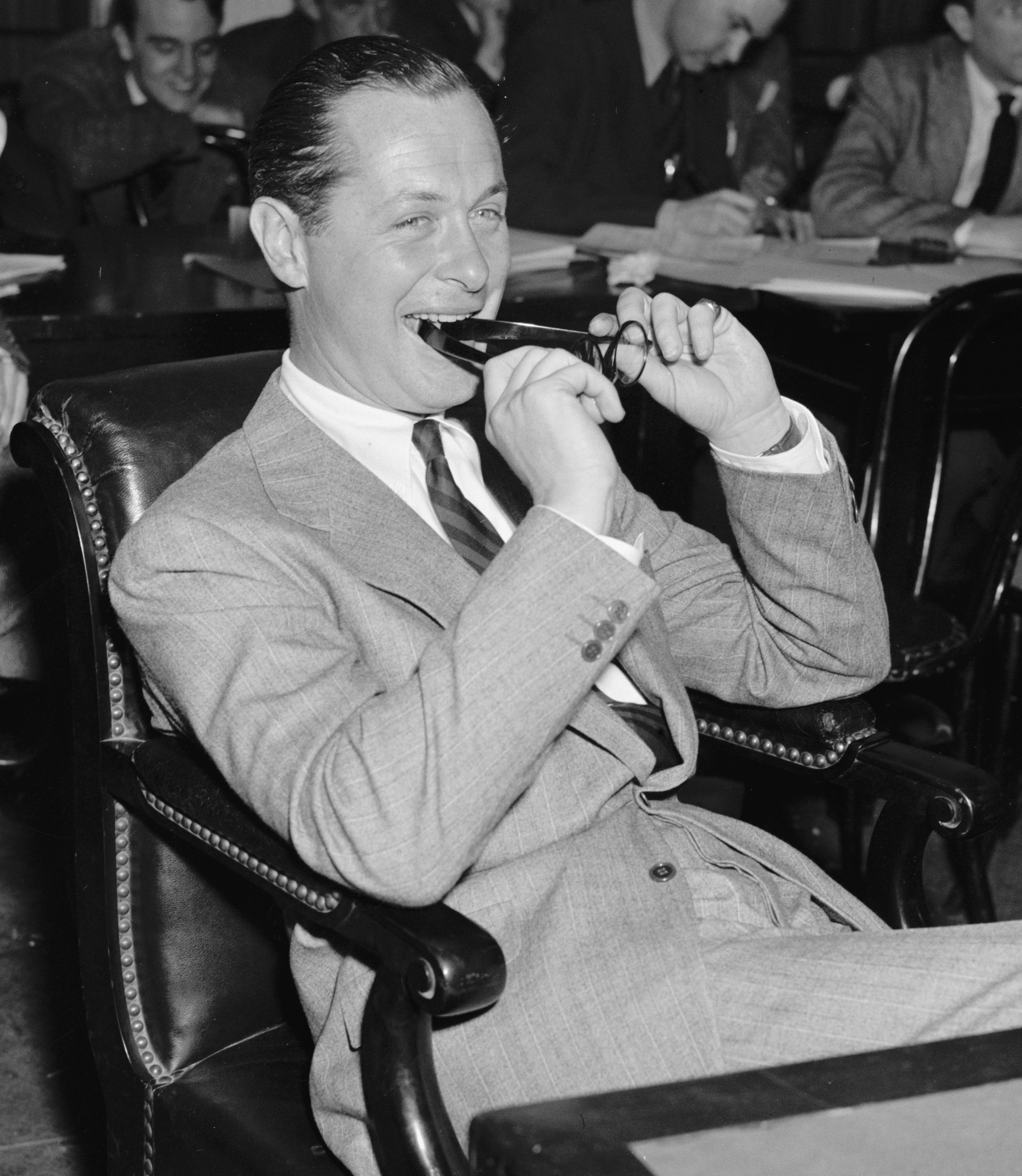
Robert Montgomery before a Senate committee in Washington, D.C., on April 3, 1939 to oppose a bill designed to prohibit block booking

Block booking is a system of selling multiple films to a theater as a unit. Block booking was the prevailing practice in the Hollywood studio system from the turn of the 1930s until it was ruled unlawful by the U.S. Supreme Court's decision in United States v. Paramount Pictures, Inc. (1948). Under block booking, "independent ('unaffiliated') theater owners were forced to take large numbers of a studio's pictures without knowing much about them. Those studios could then parcel out B movies along with A-class features and star vehicles, which made both production and distribution operations more economical." The element of the system involving the purchase of unseen pictures is known as blind bidding.

== Origins in the silent era ==
Paramount Pictures, under Adolph Zukor's leadership, was largely responsible for introducing the practice of block booking to Hollywood. General manager Al Lichtman suggested to Zukor that the studio produce 52 films a year and that they sell their yearly program in advance:

At a time when star prominence was the single most important factor determining a film's box-office success, Zukor had cornered the market. In a 1918 popularity poll ... the six top stars on the list—Mary Pickford, Marguerite Clark, Douglas Fairbanks, Harold Lockwood, William S. Hart, and Wallace Reid—were all under contract to Zukor.

Using this leverage, Paramount was able to insist that prospective exhibitors interested in, say, the Pickford films, acquire them in large blocks along with a quantity of less attractive titles. These block-booking arrangements typically included groups of from 13 to 52 or even 104 titles. Paramount salesmen offered a variety of different product lines, from the top-quality Artcraft releases of Pickford, Fairbanks, and Hart to the more modest Realart productions, in which stars such as Bebe Daniels were being developed. Because these films had not yet been produced, exhibitors were required to "buy blind" from a sketchy prospectus or campaign book.

The rest of the studio system, with the exception of United Artists, copied these policies to varying degrees. For much of the 1920s Paramount and Warner Bros., in particular, "relied heavily on block booking and blind bidding". In 1921 the Federal Trade Commission launched an investigation of the studios' booking practices that would last for 11 years. A 1927 cease and desist order was disregarded by the majors. Smaller distributors such as Associated Exhibitors that attempted to retain open booking were eventually driven to accept the practice.

== The system's growth ==
With Hollywood's conversion to sound film in the late 1920s, block booking increasingly became standard practice: in order to get access to a studio's attractive A pictures, many theaters were obliged to rent the company's entire output for a season. Paramount Pictures President Adolph Zukor obtained the Paramount-Publix chains of theaters that totaled in 1,200 screens, and insisted that the exhibitors and independent theaters sign a contract with their company if they wanted the exclusive, top-of-the-line Paramount productions. With a whole season's worth of films offered up on an all-or-nothing basis, theaters were not just bidding on movies they had not seen, but on many movies not yet even made. This was also called "blind bidding" because, other than knowing the genre, the actors and actresses, and a brief overview of the plot, the exhibitors knew nothing about the films they were acquiring. In one case, Zukor pressured theater operators to buy a block of 104 films each year and forced them to show two films per week for 52 consecutive weeks. With the B movies—less expensively produced films intended to run as the lower half of double features—rented at a flat fee (rather than the box office percentage basis of A films), rates could be set that essentially guaranteed the profitability of every B movie. Block booking and blind bidding meant that the majors did not have to worry over much about the quality of these B pictures:

Knowing that even the poorest picture would find an outlet, the studios could operate at full capacity. In the process, the majors shifted the risks of production financing to the independent exhibitor. The long-term effects of the policy also stifled competition by foreclosing the market to independent producers and distributors. In short, block booking allowed the majors to wrest the greatest amount of profits from the marketplace.

Life magazine, in a 1957 retrospective on the studio system, described the less-attractive films as "million-dollar mediocrities":

It wasn't good entertainment and it wasn't art, and most of the movies produced had a uniform mediocrity, but they were also uniformly profitable ... The million-dollar mediocrity was the very backbone of Hollywood.

Along with the blocks of features, exhibitors were required to take the major's shorts as well—a practice known as full-line forcing. The smaller Hollywood studios—known collectively as Poverty Row—did not have the big pictures with A-list stars that would have allowed them to compel theater owners to directly block book. Instead, they mostly sold exclusive regional distribution rights to so-called states' rights firms. These distributors in turn marketed blocks of movies to exhibitors, typically six or more pictures featuring the same star (given that the films' source was Poverty Row, a relatively minor star).

== End ==
In July 1938, the Justice Department's antitrust division filed a suit, United States v. Paramount Pictures, Inc. et al., charging the eight major Hollywood studios with violating the Sherman Antitrust Act.

The Sherman Antitrust Act of 1890 controlled the interstate commerce with different trust-busting provisions and were brought to bear against studio system monopolistic activities. Block booking and blind bidding were at the heart of the practices charged as illegally monopolistic. The Department of Justice filed suit against the distribution arms of Hollywood studios in the Famous Players–Lasky antitrust case of 1928. The Department of Justice charged the ten entities that controlled 98% of the domestic theatrical distribution. Appeals were filed and the studios were able to prevent charges from being followed through until 1929, due to the collapse of the stock market and the Great Depression happening at the same time, making this issue moot. The major studios controlled the programming of their theaters and also negotiated wide-ranging distribution deals that constricted the financial state of independent theaters.

On October 29, 1940, the Big Five studios (Loews Inc. (owner of MGM), Paramount, 20th Century-Fox, Warner Bros., and RKO—the majors that owned large theater chains) signed a consent decree in an attempt to settle the case. It provided, among other things, that "block booking would continue, but in blocks no larger than five films; trade shows would be held regularly to provide exhibitors with advance screenings; [and] forcing of shorts and newsreels was banned." The decree was approved by Judge Henry W. Goddard on November 20. The Little Three (Columbia, United Artists and Universal) did not join in the decree, although they did not own any theatres, and therefore the suit against them continued. Because the decree was forged after the September 1 beginning of the 1940–41 exhibition season, the new blocks-of-five arrangement did not go into effect until the 1941–42 season. When the consent decree lapsed in 1942, most of the majors continued with blocks of five, though MGM went with blocks of twelve for two years. In contrast, Warner Bros. abandoned blocks altogether in 1943. The practice was entirely outlawed by the Supreme Court's 1948 decision, United States v. Paramount, against the studios in the Paramount antitrust case.

In concurrence with decisions held by the lower courts, the Supreme Court ruled that all of the major movie studios had prevented domestic and foreign competition through their control over theaters. In its 1948 decision, the Supreme Court ordered the elimination of block booking and demanded a separation of theater holdings from production and distribution. Without control over block booking, studios feared that they could no longer force theaters to buy up to 400 movies each year. In anticipation of mass profit-loss, studios cut production schedules and terminated contracts with actors, producers, directors and other staff. Newly unemployed artists began pursuing careers in television, following earlier predecessors. As popular movie actors transitioned from the silver screen to the television screen, viewers followed their favorite artists to the new medium. In 1951, almost all cities with television stations saw a significant increase in movie theater closures corresponding with a simultaneous increase in television viewership.

== Sources ==
- Balio, Tino (1993). Grand Design: Hollywood as a Modern Business Enterprise, 1930-1939. Berkeley, Los Angeles, and London: University of California Press (published 1995). ISBN 0-520-20334-8.
- Barnouw, Erik (1990). Tube of Plenty: The Evolution of American Television (2nd Revised ed.). New York: Oxford University Press. ISBN 0-19-506484-4.
- Becker, Christine (2009). It's the Pictures That Got Small: Hollywood Film Stars on 1950s Television. Middletown, CT: Wesleyan University Press. ISBN 9780819568946.
- Koszarski, Richard (1990). An Evening's Entertainment: The Age of the Silent Feature Picture, 1915-1928. Berkeley, Los Angeles, and London: University of California Press (published 1994). ISBN 0-520-08535-3.
- Schatz, Thomas (1988). The Genius of the System: Hollywood Filmmaking in the Studio Era. London: Faber & Faber (published 1998). ISBN 0-571-19596-2.
- Schatz, Thomas (1997). Boom and Bust: American Cinema in the 1940s. Berkeley, Los Angeles, and London: University of California Press (published 1999). ISBN 0-520-22130-3.
- Taves, Brian (1993). "Chapter 8: The B Film: Hollywood's Other Half". In Balio, Tino (ed.). Grand Design: Hollywood as a Modern Business Enterprise, 1930-1939. Berkeley, Los Angeles, and London: University of California Press (published 1995). pp. 313–350. ISBN 0-520-20334-8.
- Torre, Paul J. (2009). "Block Booking Migrates to Television: The Rise and Fall of the International Output Deal". Television & New Media. 10 (6): 501–520. doi:10.1177/1527476409343797. ISSN 1527-4764. S2CID 154355283.
- Ward, Richard Lewis. When the Cock Crows: A History of the Pathé Exchange. SIU Press, 2016.
