= NetBank =

Defunct American financial services firm

NetBank, Inc.
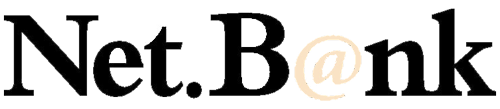
- Formerly: Atlanta Internet Bank (1996) and Net.B@nk (1998)
- Type: Public company
- Traded as: Nasdaq: NTBK (1997-2007)
- Industry: Financial services
- Founded: 1996
- Defunct: September 28, 2007; 19 years ago
- Fate: Closed by the Office of Thrift Supervision. Most of the deposits were acquired by ING Group.
- Headquarters: Alpharetta, Georgia, United States
- Key people: Steven F. Herbert, CEO
- Products: Retail banking Mortgage loans Vehicle insurance
- Services: Online banking
- Website: Archived August 20, 2007, at the Wayback Machine

NetBank, formerly named Atlanta Internet Bank (1996) and Net.B@nk (1998), was an American direct bank that operated between 1996 and 2007. Netbank suffered from bank failure and was closed by regulators on September 28, 2007.

Its deposits were acquired by ING Group and the Netbank.com domain name was acquired by Axos Financial.

== History ==
=== Foundation and IPO ===
The company was founded in February 1996 as Atlanta Internet Bank, one of the first direct banks in the United States. Using a business model typical of direct banks, NetBank paid higher than average interest rates in exchange for not having physical bank branches.

On July 29, 1997, NetBank Inc, completed its initial public offering, raising $42 million.

In 1998, the company changed its name to Net.B@nk.

In 1999, during the dot-com bubble, NetBank's stock price per share ranged from $3.50 to $83.

=== 2000-2006 Growth and acquisitions ===
In March 2001, the bank acquired deposit accounts from CompuBank.

In July 2001, the bank acquired Market Street Mortgage.

In 2002, the bank acquired Resource Bancshares Mortgage Group. Douglas K. Freeman was appointed CEO of the company as of March 31, 2002 and was appointed chairman as of January 29, 2003.

In November 2003, NetBank began offering vehicle insurance through sister company NetInsurance and began offering direct consumer auto loans through Florida auto dealerships. In December 2003, NetBank acquired Financial Technologies Inc., a provider of ATMs and retail transaction processing services.

In July 2004, NetBank acquired the assets of Beacon Credit Services, a provider of recreational vehicle, boat, and aircraft financing.

NetBank reported a loss in 2005 as a result of a provision for bad loans.

In 2006, Netbank began offering check deposit services via The UPS Store.

=== 2006 - 2007 Lead up to failure ===
In 2006, NetBank lowered its documentation and underwriting standards to increase loan production. NetBank sold many of its loans to other investors, with the loans being partially recourse to NetBank. In 2006, NetBank was forced to repurchase $182 million in bad loans that it sold previously.

In November 2006, the company's independent auditor, Ernst & Young, resigned.

For the full year 2006, the company reported a $202 million loss.

On May 1, 2007, the company sold NetBank Payment Systems, its ATM and merchant-servicing operation.

On May 21, 2007, NetBank reached an agreement to sell its core banking operation to EverBank. All accounts were to have been transferred by September 15, 2007, but the deal depended on NetBank coming up with some cash, which it expected to realize from the sale of other investments. NetBank was unable to sell those investments, and on September 17, 2007, EverBank terminated the agreement.

On May 15, 2007, NetBank received a warning from the NASDAQ because it was late in filing its quarterly report. NetBank received a similar notice from Nasdaq in March 2007 because it did not file its 2006 annual report on time as a result of the resignation of its auditor.

In February 2007, NetBank hired Porter Keadle Moore LLP as its new independent auditor and said it planned to file the annual and quarterly reports by the end of June 2007.

On July 3, 2007, NetBank Inc. received a deficiency notice from the NASDAQ because its stock for the previous 30 consecutive business days failed to close above the minimum bid price of $1 per share. On August 3, it was delisted from the Nasdaq.

=== 2007 - Closure and aftermath ===
On September 28, 2007, the Office of Thrift Supervision (OTS) announced that it had closed NetBank in conjunction with the Federal Deposit Insurance Corporation. The shutdown was the biggest failure of a savings and loan association since the savings and loan crisis in the 1980s. It was also the biggest bank failure in Georgia. All of its customers, including its $1.4 billion in FDIC-insured deposits, as well as some loan assets, were sold to ING Group for $14 million.

Customers with balances exceeding the FDIC limit received 50% of the excess balance and became creditors in the bank's receivership for the remainder.

In November 2007, NetBank Inc., parent of the savings-and-loan, filed for bankruptcy protection and announced intentions to liquidate, including selling its real estate in Columbia, South Carolina as well as its captive insurance subsidiary M.G. Reinsurance Inc. Federal savings and loan associations are prohibited from filing for bankruptcy protection and must be liquidated by the FDIC.

A class action lawsuit was filed by former shareholders against certain officers and directors of the company alleging that they inflated the stock price by making misleading statements. The lawsuits were settled in November 2011 for $12.5 million.
