= Agency banking model =

Function of certain Kenyan commercial banks

The agency banking model is a function of certain commercial banks in Kenya. The activity is regulated by the Central Bank of Kenya, which allows banks to contract third-party retail networks as a Banking agent. Upon successful application, vetting, and approval, these agents are authorized to offer selected products and services on behalf of the bank.

== Definition ==
A banking agent in Kenya is a commercial entity that has been contracted by a commercial bank and approved by the Central Bank of Kenya to provide specific services on behalf of the bank. This entity is equipped with the skills necessary to provide basic banking services according to standards set by the Bank.

This allows the banking agent entity to access financial products and services at a location nearest to the customer, thus breaking down certain barriers to financial inclusion such as cost and accessibility.

== Approved financial activities ==
Activities that a banking agent can engage in are determined by the contracting bank after assessment of the applying entity. Some of these include:

- Cash withdrawal
- Bill payment
- Cash deposits
- Funds transfer
- Balance inquiry
- Document collection for debit and credit cards, loan applications, and account opening
- Collecting bank correspondence and mail
- Mobile banking services

Agency banking transactions are denominated in Kenyan shillings.

== Prohibited activities ==
- Execute transactions during network and/or communication failure.
- Charge customers any fees
- Carry out agency banking business when an agent is no longer contracted by a bank
- Offer its own banking services apart from the sponsoring bank
- Perform anti-money laundering services
- Conduct foreign exchange transactions
- Deposit checks or engage in encashing
- Provision cash advances and loans
- Subcontract to any business to run its agency banking

When an agency continues to perform prohibited activities, their contract may be terminated.
