= CompuBank =

American financial company

CompuBank, N.A.
- Industry: Finance
- Founded: 1998
- Founder: Frank Goldberg
- Defunct: 2001
- Fate: Acquired by NetBank in 2001.
- Headquarters: Greenway Plaza; Houston, Texas, United States
- Products: retail banking, mortgage banking, and business finance
- Website: compubank.com

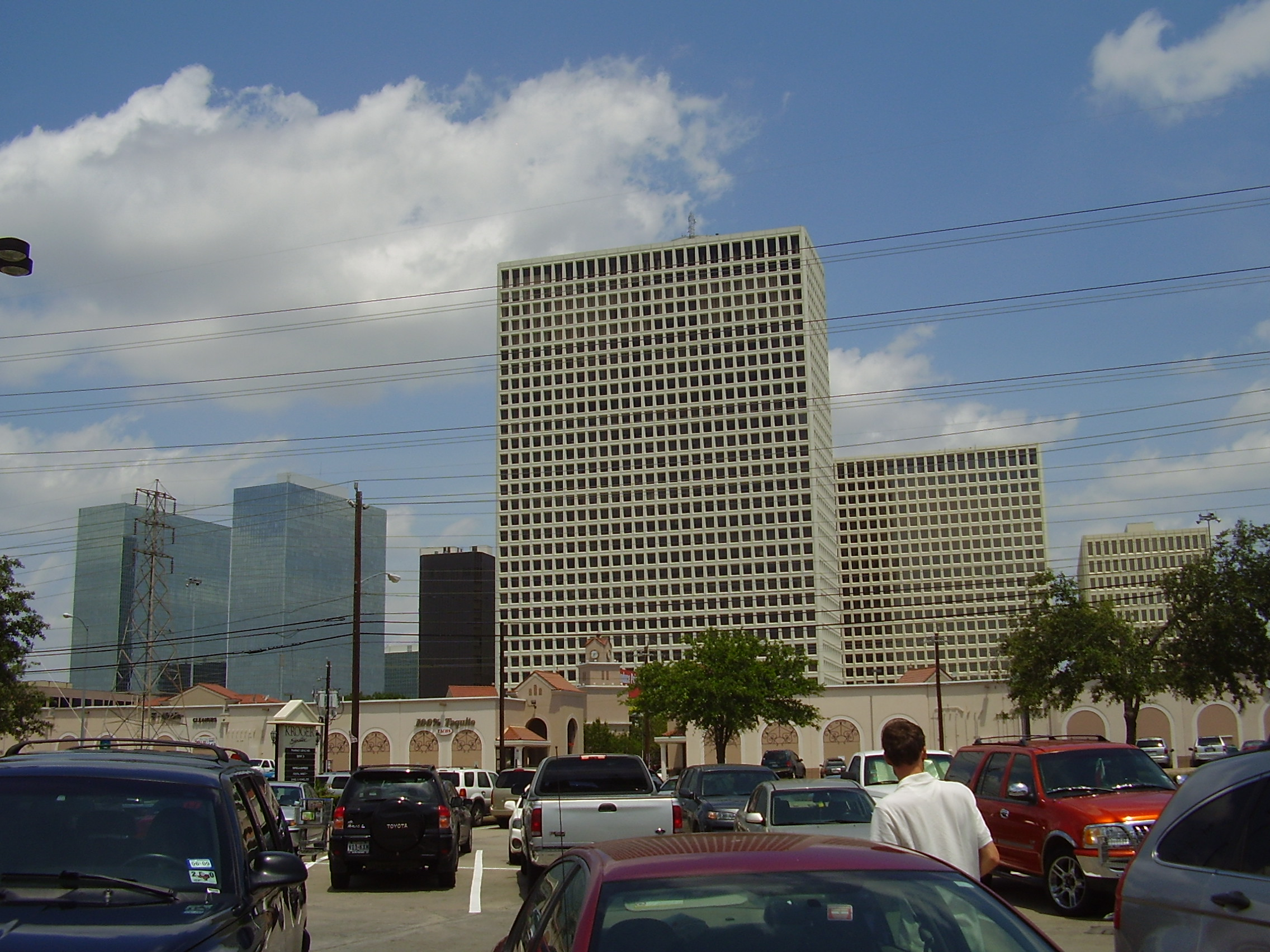
The headquarters of CompuBank was in Greenway Plaza

CompuBank, N.A. was a financial company engaged primarily in retail banking, mortgage banking, business finance and providing ATM and merchant processing services. CompuBank was founded in 1998 by banking veteran Frank Goldberg and launched on the internet in early October the same year. It was one of the pioneers of the Internet banking industry, and recognized as one of the first internet-only banks.

Headquartered in Suite in Suite 215 in 2 Greenway Plaza East, Houston, Texas, CompuBank was third internet-only bank, and the first American nationally chartered as a national bank by the Office of the Comptroller of the Currency operating solely on the internet. The previous two Net-only banks, Security First Network Bank (SFNB) and NetBank (formerly Atlanta Internet Bank), used thrift charters. CompuBank offered a variety of depository products and services including: basic checking, interest checking, savings, money market accounts, certificates of deposits, visa check cards, direct deposit and transfers, free domestic wire services, online check re-order, free bill payment and free ATM services.

Compubank was launched in late 1998. After a tough start with an amateurish web site which was basically a site map plus four buttons, the bank tried to remake itself into a small business bank. However, the bank ran into difficulties due to its lack of loan products, and was acquired by NetBank in early 2001.

== See also ==
- Online banking
- Telephone banking
