= EverBank Stadium =

Stadium in Jacksonville, Florida

- The Bank

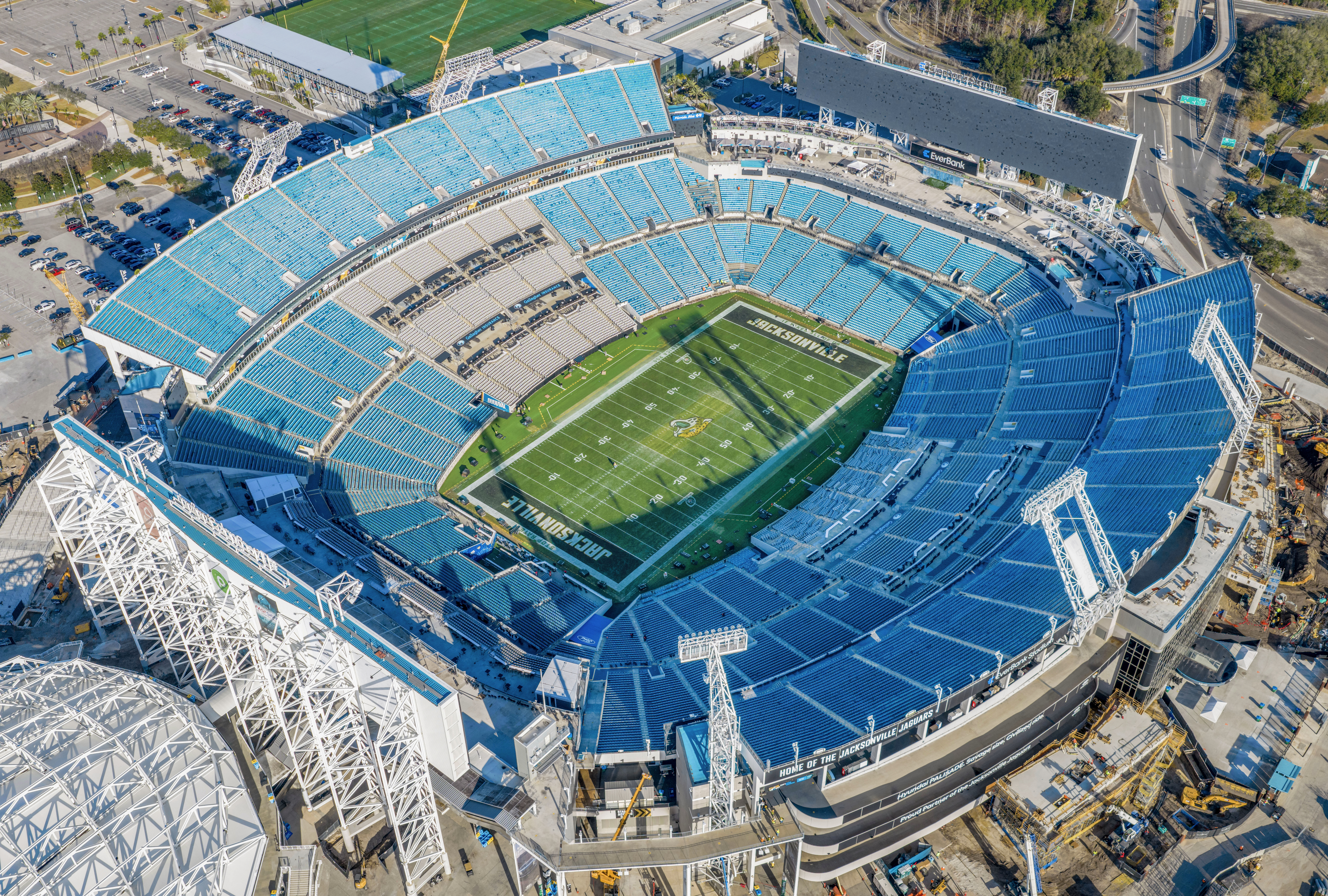
- EverBank Stadium in 2026

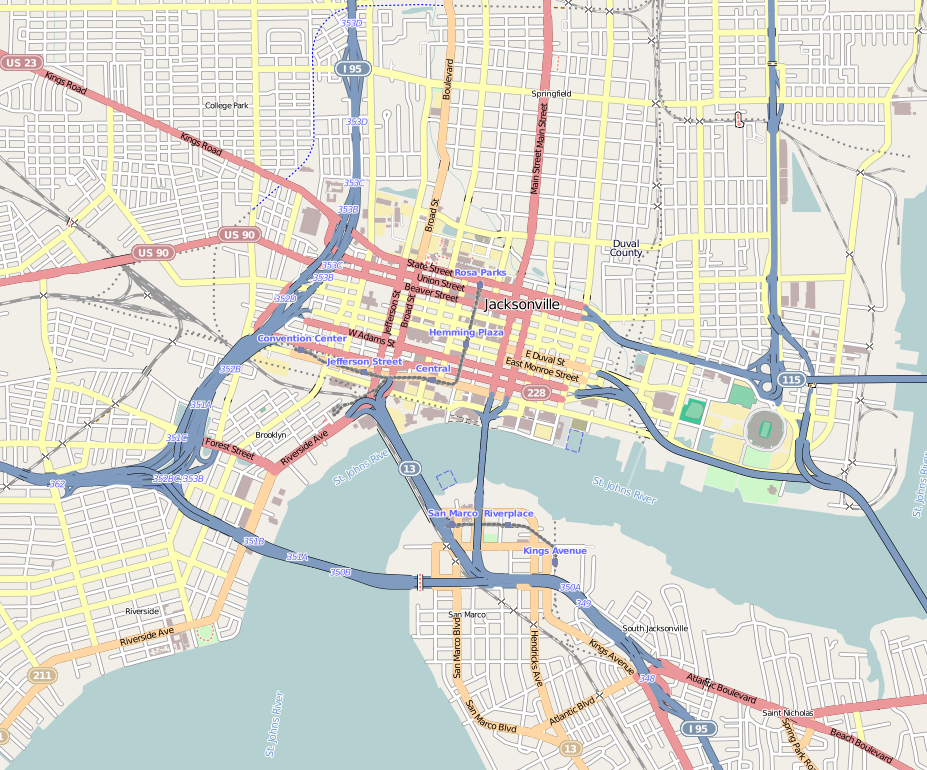
- Location in Jacksonville Location in Florida Location in the United States
- Former names: Jacksonville Municipal Stadium (1995–1996, 2007–2010); Alltel Stadium (1997–2006); EverBank Field (2010–2018); TIAA Bank Field (2018–2023)
- Address: 1 EverBank Stadium Drive
- Location: Jacksonville, Florida, U.S.
- Coordinates: 30°19′26″N 81°38′15″W
- Owner: City of Jacksonville
- Operator: ASM Global
- Capacity: 67,814 (expandable to 82,000); 42,507 (during renovations)
- Executive suites: 75
- Surface: Tifway 419 Bermuda Grass
- Record attendance: 85,413 (Florida State Seminoles vs. Alabama Crimson Tide, September 29, 2007)

Construction
- Groundbreaking: January 3, 1994
- Opened: August 18, 1995; 31 years ago
- Renovated: 2003–2004, 2014, 2016, 2025–2028
- Cost: US$121 million ($263 million in 2025 dollars)
- Architect: HOK Sport
- Structural engineers: Bliss and Nyitray, Inc
- Services engineers: M-E Engineers, Inc.
- General contractor: Huber, Hunt & Nichols

Tenants
- Jacksonville Jaguars (NFL) (1995–present); Gator Bowl (NCAA) (1996–present); Florida–Georgia football rivalry (NCAA) (1996–present); Jacksonville Armada FC (NASL) (2015)

Website
- everbankstadium.com

EverBank Stadium is an American football stadium in Jacksonville, Florida, United States. It is the home facility of the Jacksonville Jaguars of the National Football League (NFL), and the headquarters of the professional wrestling promotions All Elite Wrestling (AEW) and Ring of Honor (ROH).

The stadium opened in 1995 as Jacksonville Municipal Stadium on the site of the old Gator Bowl Stadium (erected 1927), and included some portions of the older stadium. Located on the St. Johns River, it sits on 10 acres (4.0 ha) of land in downtown Jacksonville. In addition to hosting the Jaguars, the stadium is regularly used for college football, concerts, and other events. It is the regular site of the annual Florida–Georgia football rivalry game, a matchup between the Florida Gators of the University of Florida and the Georgia Bulldogs of the University of Georgia. The stadium is also the home of the annual Gator Bowl, a post-season college bowl game. Additionally, the stadium hosted Super Bowl XXXIX in 2005 and is one of the venues used by the United States men's national soccer team.

From 1997 to 2006, the stadium was named Alltel Stadium after communications company Alltel purchased naming rights. The facility was renamed EverBank Field in 2010, following the approval of a five-year, naming rights deal with the financial services company EverBank. The agreement was extended in 2014 for an additional 10 years. The Jaguars announced in February 2018 the stadium would be renamed TIAA Bank Field for the 2018 NFL season after EverBank was acquired by New York–based Teachers Insurance and Annuity Association of America (TIAA). In June 2023, the Jaguars announced the team's home stadium would be renamed EverBank Stadium prior to the start of the season.

The stadium temporarily played host to the New Orleans Saints during the 2021 NFL season after the team was forced to relocate from Caesars Superdome owing to the aftermath of Hurricane Ida.

== Construction ==
EverBank Stadium is located in the Stadium District of downtown Jacksonville, which has been home to football fields since the early 20th century. In 1928 the first permanent football stadium, Fairfield Stadium, was constructed. In 1948 this was expanded and renamed Gator Bowl Stadium, in honor of the annual Gator Bowl game first played two years earlier.

The current structure was built using a few portions of the historic Gator Bowl Stadium. However, all of the elements included from the older stadium—the pedestrian ramp system and the more recent West Upper Deck section of the complex—dated back only to 1982. Construction started January 3, 1994, and the new stadium opened on August 18, 1995, with an exhibition game with the St. Louis Rams. Total construction time was under 20 months and total cost was US$134 million—$60 million of which was provided by the city of Jacksonville.

=== Planning ===
In January 1993, representatives from the University of Florida and University of Georgia began negotiating with Jacksonville representatives to renew the contract to host the Florida–Georgia game, the annual rivalry game between the college football teams of the two universities. The universities' five-year contract with the Gator Bowl ended after the 1994 game, and the Citrus Bowl had offered Florida and Georgia a larger sum of money than the Gator Bowl for the right to host the game.

To counter the Citrus Bowl's larger monetary offer, Jacksonville mayor Ed Austin proposed a $25.5 million renovation plan to Jacksonville's aging Gator Bowl Stadium, which had been built in 1949. Both teams had expressed concerns about the condition of the aging stadium, and renovations were considered key to enticing the teams to keep returning to Jacksonville, bringing tens of millions of dollars in consumer spending with them. Despite the promise of renovations, Georgia athletic director Vince Dooley was unswayed, so Austin widened the scope of the renovations, increasing their price tag to $49 million, and traveled to Athens, Georgia, to talk with Dooley in person. Austin's campaigning was partially successful. On March 23, 1993, the two universities announced they had signed a five-year contract with the Gator Bowl, running from 1997 to 2002. The contract was contingent on Austin successfully passing the $49 million renovation bond issue through the Jacksonville City Council and the city completing the renovations by the 1996 game. On Tuesday, May 11, the Jacksonville City Council approved a $219.5 million bond issue, including the $49 million for the renovation of the Gator Bowl.

=== NFL expansion ===
Soon after the approval of the bond issue, investors interested in attracting a new National Football League team to Jacksonville requested that another $30 million be added to the $49 million renovations in order to make the stadium more attractive for a professional team. That number climbed higher throughout the summer, and eventually the city reached an agreement with the leading group of investors hoping to attract an NFL team to Jacksonville. On July 1, the city and investors reached a lease agreement contingent on the city investing $112.3 million for improving the Gator Bowl. The lease agreement later collapsed when the Jacksonville City Council voted to send the lease back to a committee for further study rather than approving it. One month after the proposed deal fell through, city officials and investors tried again and were successful in negotiating a deal that included a pledge to spend $121 million on renovations to the Gator Bowl. Due to the expanded renovations, it was announced that the 1994 Florida-Georgia game would have to be moved out of the Gator Bowl, as had the 1995 game, in order to provide time for the newly expanded renovation plan to be completed before 1996. In the end, the expanded bond issue and renovation program proved to be successful, as Jacksonville was awarded the 30th NFL franchise—the Jacksonville Jaguars—on November 30, 1993.

Almost as soon as the celebration surrounding Jacksonville's new NFL team died down, a renovation contractor's plan to give 8% of the stadium work to minority-owned businesses drew criticism. The NAACP and another group said African-American businesses should have been awarded twice that amount of work.

== Current stadium ==
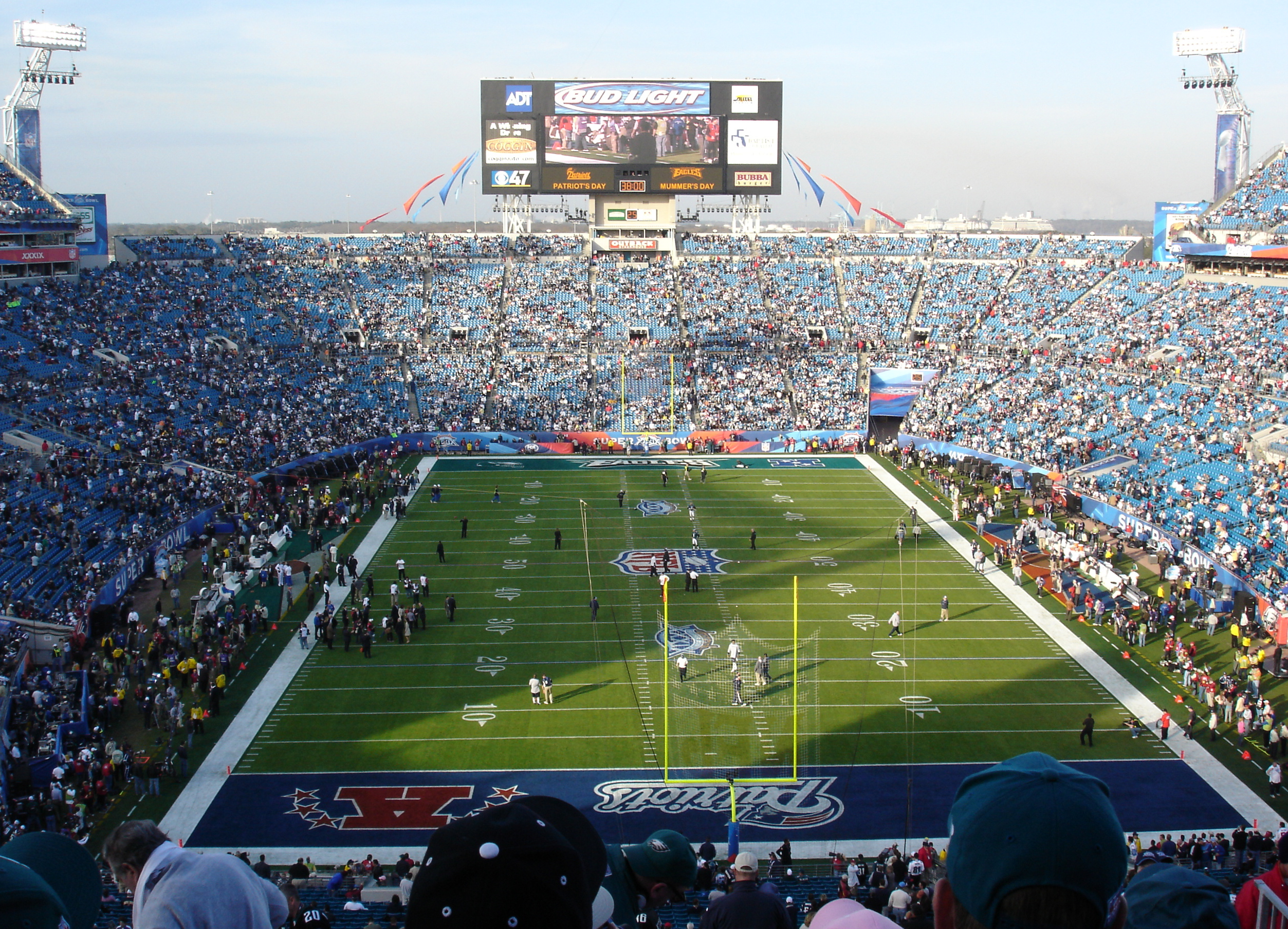
Super Bowl XXXIX

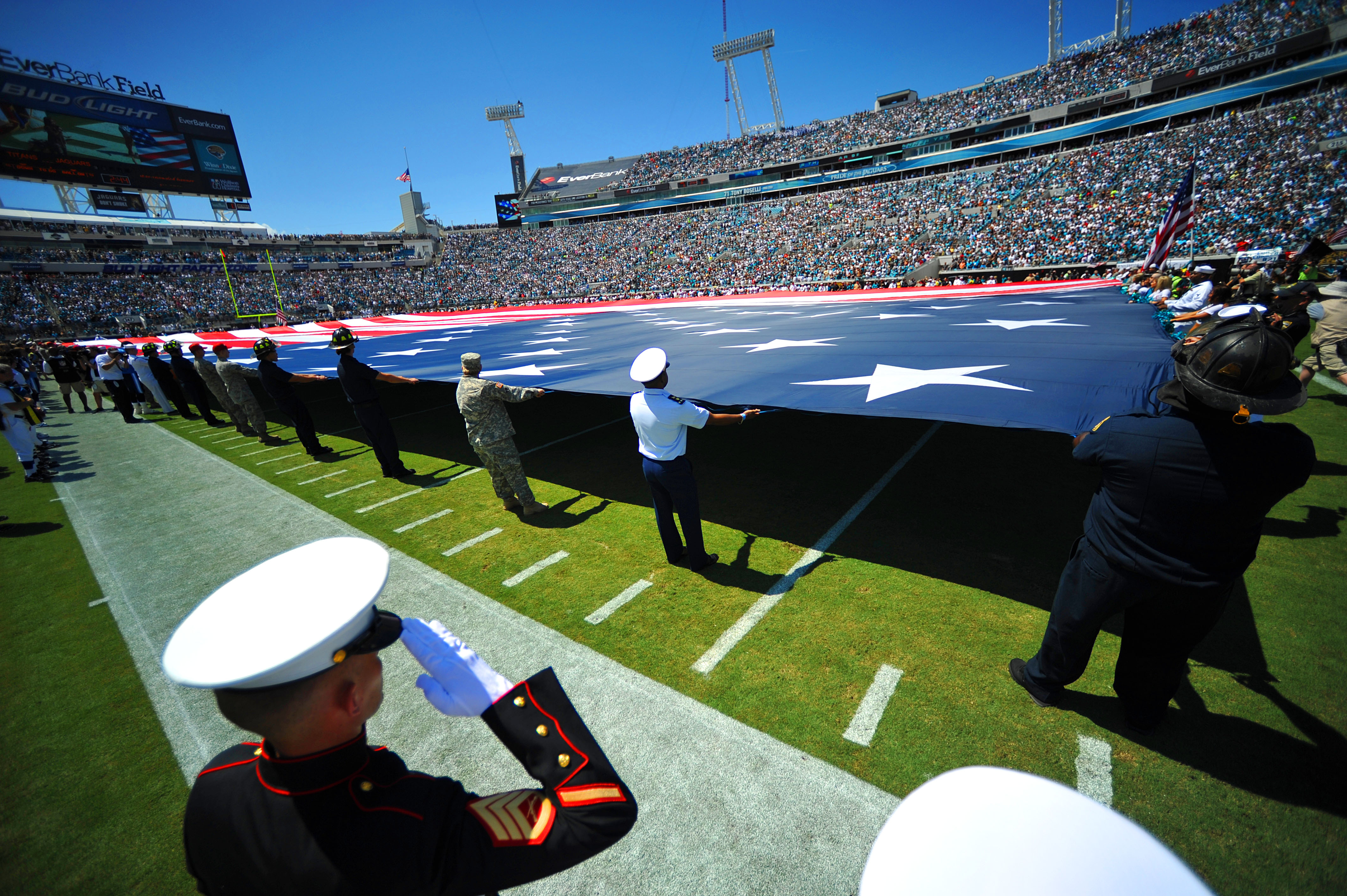
EverBank Stadium during 10th anniversary of 9/11

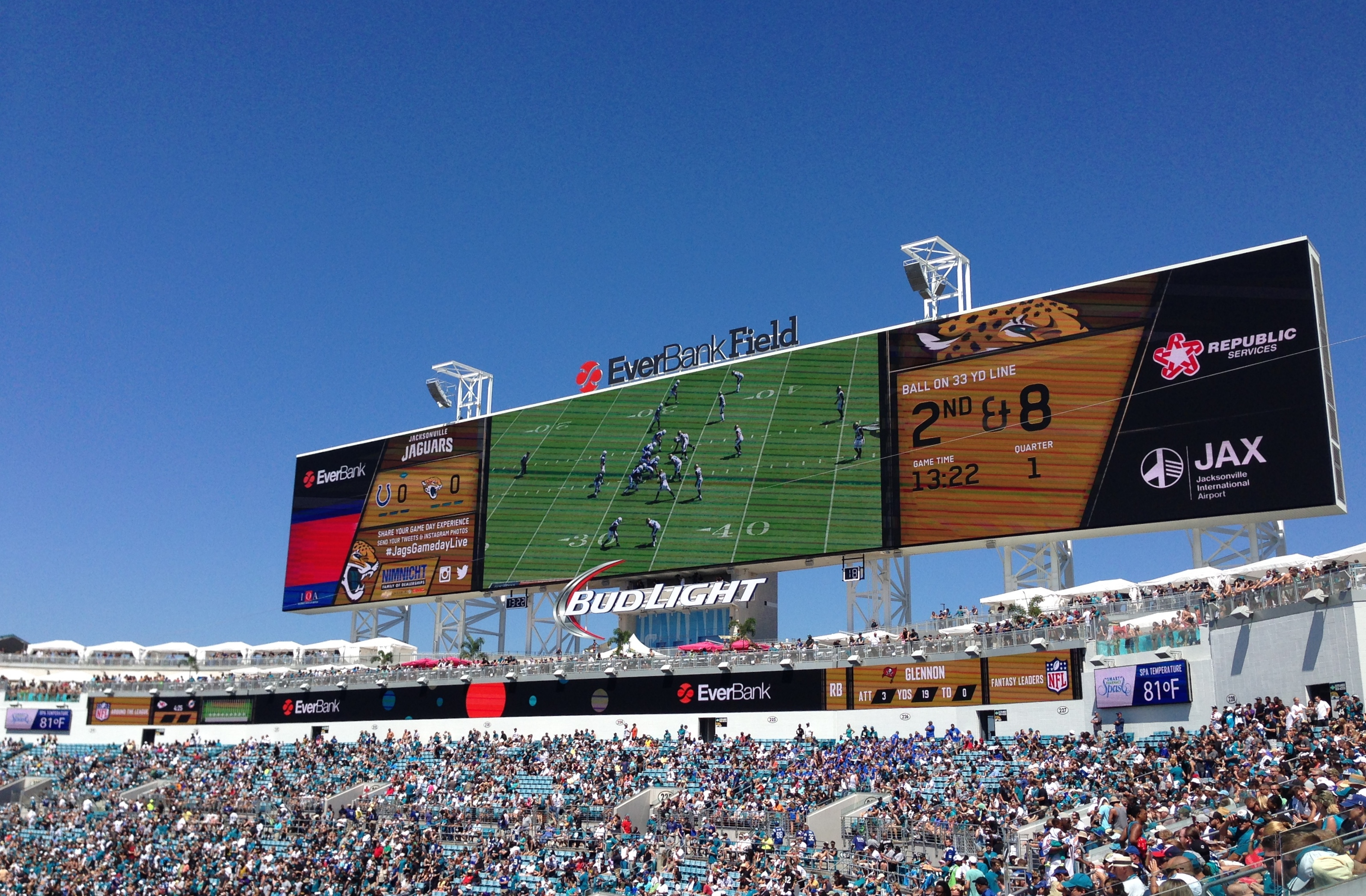
New scoreboard and party deck installed in 2014

The stadium's re-opening day was also the home debut of the Jaguars during the 1995 NFL season. It was the first time that an expansion NFL team had played its first game in a new facility; they played the Houston Oilers in the opener and lost 10–3. The Gator Bowl returned as a New Year's Day bowl game on January 1, 1996, following the 1995 NCAA season.

The stadium contains 11,200 club seats, 88 luxury suites, and a "super suite".

In 1997, the stadium changed its name to Alltel Stadium after naming rights were acquired by Alltel, a telecommunications company best known as a wireless carrier. The name Alltel Stadium stopped being used by the city after January 2007 when the contract expired; by that point, most of Alltel's assets had been purchased by Verizon.

In 2005, the stadium hosted Super Bowl XXXIX in which the New England Patriots defeated the Philadelphia Eagles 24–21 in front of 78,125, the largest Super Bowl in attendance since 1994. Paul McCartney performed at halftime, performing Beatles classics "Drive My Car", "Get Back", and "Hey Jude", as well as a firework-filled "Live and Let Die". In 2003 and 2004, $47 million in improvements to the stadium were implemented to prepare for the Super Bowl. These improvements included the addition of a unique sports bar in the south end zone called the "Bud Zone", a larger and wider video and scoring display from Daktronics, escalators in the north and south end zone, and a new "terrace suite" called the "Sky Patio" right above the "Bud Zone" in the south end zone.

Before the 2005 season, mainly due to low attendance figures and looming blackouts, team officials installed a series of tarps to reduce the seating capacity for Jaguars games. The covers were placed to block out seven sections in the upper north end zone and four in each upper deck section, located on the corners of each. This puts 9,703 seats out of service, leaving the stadium with 66,851 seats for the regular season. However, in the event the Jaguars make the AFC Championship Game, the stadium can easily be expanded to full capacity. Some believed that this was a sign that the city couldn't support an NFL team; the city is the second-smallest market in the league. However, the current capacity is actually very close to what Wayne Weaver included in his original proposal to bring the Gator Bowl up to NFL standards. The city council turned this plan down, mainly out of concern for not having enough seats to accommodate the annual Florida-Georgia game.

Despite the changes, however, blackouts have still occurred, including two of their first three home games in 2007 and nine of ten games in 2009. It is believed that the 2008 US financial crisis played a major part in the 2009 season blackouts, leading to insufficient ticket sales, with only the final home engagement of the regular season, with the Indianapolis Colts, managing to sell out. However, the Jaguars' 2010 season saw a huge turnaround in ticket sales, with no games being blacked out that year. The Jaguars avoided blackouts in all games in 2011 and 2012.

For the Super Bowl, Florida–Georgia game, and occasionally the Gator Bowl, temporary bleachers are put up in the south end zone, raising capacity to over 84,000.

The attendance record was set on September 29, 2007, when 85,413 watched Florida State defeat Alabama in what was dubbed the River City Showdown. Each school received nearly 36,000 tickets, and the Gator Bowl Association added 5,800 seats.

On July 26, 2010, naming rights to the stadium were bought by EverBank, one of the nation's largest privately held bank holding companies. On August 10, the deal was officially approved by the Jacksonville City Council with a 14–3 vote.

In November 2013, Jacksonville's City Council approved $63 million in improvements to EverBank Field. Jaguars owner Shahid Khan helped finance $20 million of the cost. Renovations included two end zone video scoreboards 362-foot (110 m) long that are the largest HD LED of their kind in the world, a platform area in the north end zone with two wading pools, unique food and beverage offerings, interactive activities, and 55,000 square feet (5,100 m^{2}) of HD video screens, which is a world record for a stadium. Construction of the platform resulted in the removal of approximately 7,000 seats, though temporary seating can be installed for major events that will require a larger stadium capacity. During the construction a live webcam was set up to view the progress of the new video scoreboards. The scoreboards were publicly unveiled on July 26, 2014.

In the middle of 2016, the Jaguars and the city of Jacksonville announced $90 million in improvements to the stadium. Phase 1 includes the improvements to club seating, sponsored by US Assure, new walkout patios at the 50-yard-line and the creation of a new south end zone tunnel that will be the new team entrance and create two new seating environments. Phase 2 includes the construction of an amphitheater (Daily's Place) and a covered flex field; both phases were completed in May 2017.

After the successful 2017 season which saw the Jaguars return to the playoffs for the first time since the 2007 season and host a playoff game for the first time since 1999, the Jaguars announced the removal of the last of the tarps on the upper levels. The removal adds 3,501 seats to the capacity of the stadium bringing total capacity to 67,814.

The stadium was temporarily rebranded to TrEverBank Stadium before the Jaguars' 2024 season 18–13 home opener loss against the Cleveland Browns, in an allusion to Jaguars quarterback Trevor Lawrence through a publicity stunt as part of his collaboration with EverBank.

== "Stadium of the Future" ==
The stadium is planned to undergo wholesale renovations around 2025 and 2026. This could force the Jaguars, the Gator Bowl, and the Florida–Georgia game to temporarily play elsewhere during the reconstruction. In June 2023, the Jaguars unveiled plans for the renovation. Dubbed the "Stadium of the Future", the plans include a 360-degree concourse, an energy-efficient facade, and a large canopy to provide shade. Capacity will be reduced to 62,000, expandable to 71,500 for college football games.

In October 2024 NFL owners voted unanimously to approve the renovation. The $1.4 billion project began in February 2025 and is projected to be completed before the start of the NFL season in 2028. While the Jaguars had initially planned to spend the 2026 and 2027 seasons away from the stadium, it was decided that it would be only the 2027 season that the team would be away at Camping World Stadium in Orlando, though the 2026 season will see capacity reduced to 42,507.

== Seating capacity ==
The seating capacity for Jaguars games has gone as follows:

Years	Capacity
1995–2001	73,000
2003–2004	76,877
2005–2009	67,164
2010–2013	67,246
2014	67,297
2015	66,851
2016–2017	64,428
2018–2025	67,814
2026	42,507

== Notable events ==
=== Soccer ===
Date	Winning Team	Result	Losing Team	Tournament	Spectators
June 17, 1997	United States	2–1	Israel	Friendly	8,436
February 6, 1999	United States	3–0	Germany	Friendly	17,259
May 26, 2012	United States	5–1	Scotland	Friendly	44,438
February 9, 2013	United States women	4–1	Scotland women	Women's friendly	18,656
June 7, 2014	United States	2–1	Nigeria	Friendly	52,033
September 6, 2016	United States	4–0	Trinidad and Tobago	2018 FIFA World Cup qualification	19,410
April 5, 2018	United States women	4–1	Mexico women	Women's friendly	14,360
November 10, 2019	United States women	6–0	Costa Rica women	Women's friendly	12,914

=== Concerts ===
Date	Artist	Opening act(s)	Tour / Concert name	Attendance	Revenue	Notes
November 12, 1997	U2	Third Eye Blind	PopMart Tour	—	—	
June 4, 1999	Shania Twain	Leahy	Come On Over Tour	—	—	
May 23, 2001	NSYNC	BBMak; 3LW; Lil' Romeo; Tony Lucca	PopOdyssey	42,218 / 71,256	$2,030,372	Postponed from May 18.
February 6, 2005	Paul McCartney	—	Super Bowl XXXIX			
June 14, 2014	Jason Aldean	Florida Georgia Line; Tyler Farr	Burn It Down Tour	—	—	
June 13, 2015	Zac Brown Band	—	Jekyll and Hyde Tour	—	—	These concerts were part of the Florida Country SuperFest.
June 14, 2015	Kenny Chesney	Brantley Gilbert	The Big Revival Tour	—	—	These concerts were part of the Florida Country SuperFest.
September 2, 2018	Lynyrd Skynyrd	Kid Rock; Jason Aldean; The Charlie Daniels Band; Blackberry Smoke the Marshall Tucker Band	The Last of the Street Survivors Farewell Tour	—	—	
July 19, 2019	The Rolling Stones	The Revivalists	No Filter Tour	50,358 / 50,358	$10,198,392	This concert was originally scheduled to take place on April 24, 2019 but was postponed due to Mick Jagger recovering from a heart procedure.
July 31, 2021	Green Day; Fall Out Boy; Weezer	The Interrupters	Hella Mega Tour	-	-	This concert was originally scheduled to take place on August 6, 2020 but was postponed due to the COVID-19 pandemic in Florida.
July 2, 2022	Def Leppard; Mötley Crüe	Poison; Joan Jett and the Blackhearts; Classless Act	The Stadium Tour	-	-	This concert was originally scheduled to take place on June 18, 2020 but was postponed until August 7, 2021 due to the COVID-19 pandemic in Florida. It was then postponed again the following year, also due to COVID-19.
May 3, 2024	Luke Combs		Growin' Up and Gettin' Old Tour			
May 4, 2024	Luke Combs		Growin' Up and Gettin' Old Tour			

== Gallery ==
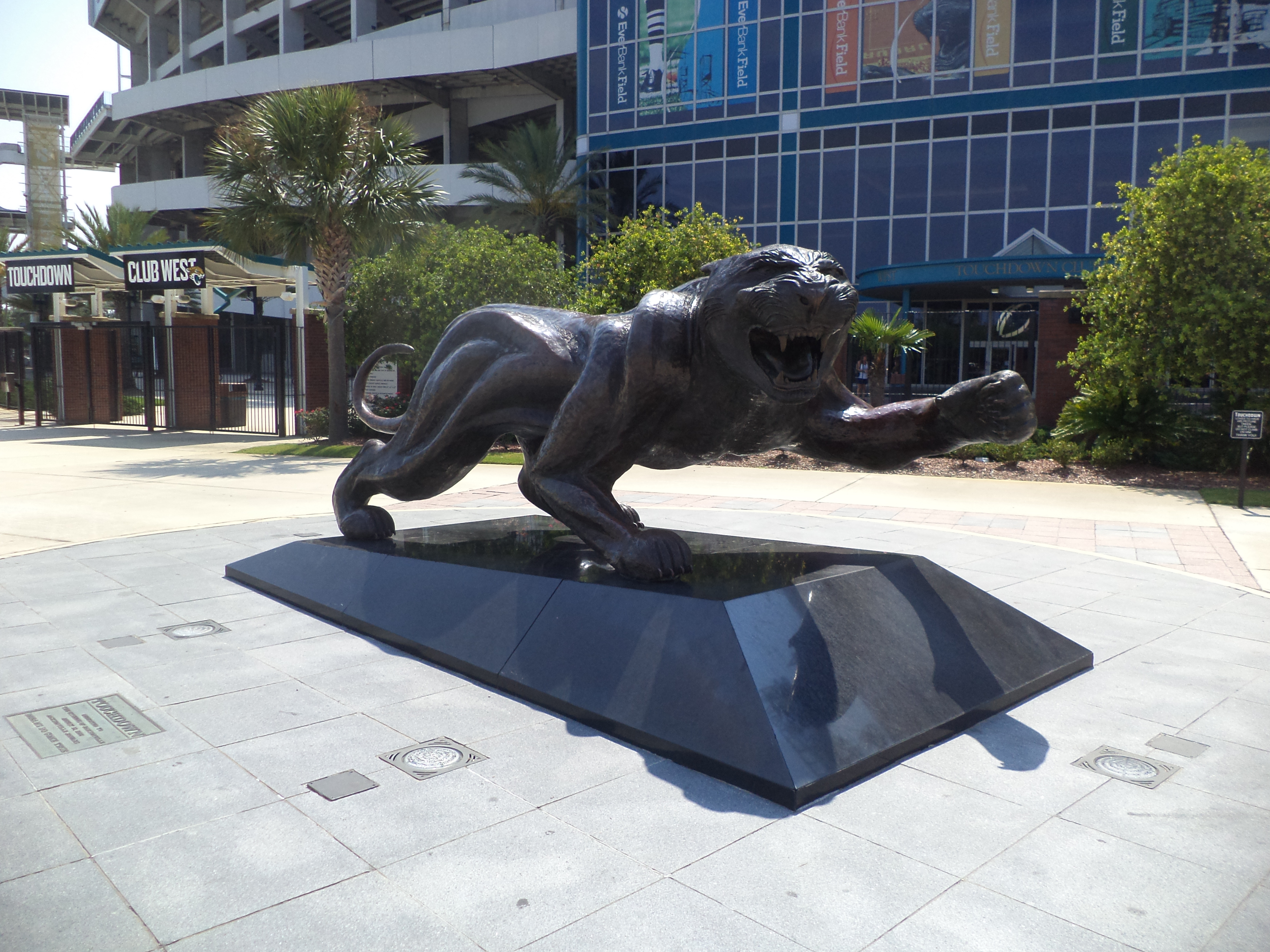
Jaguar statue in front of the stadium

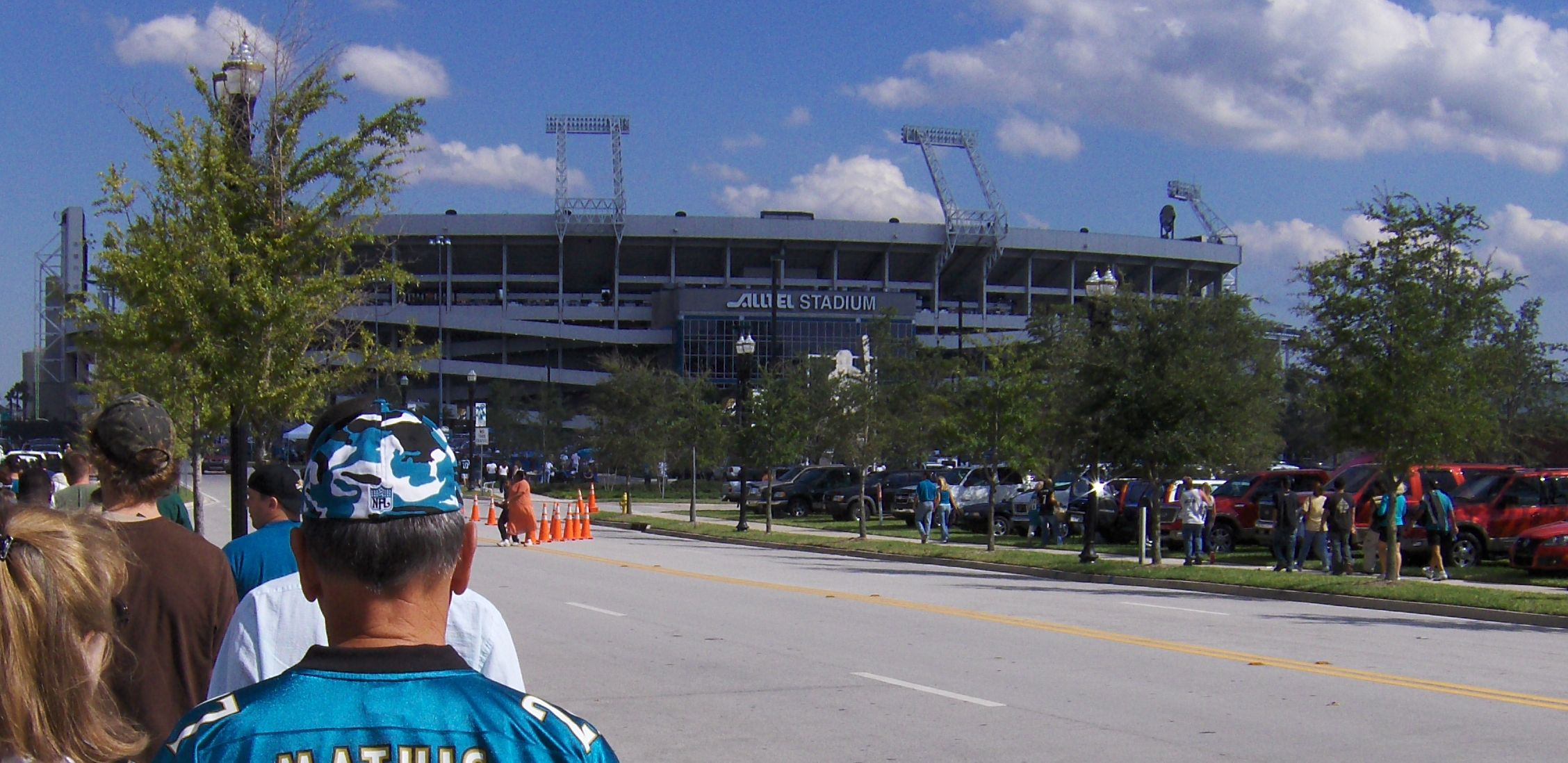
EverBank Stadium in 2006

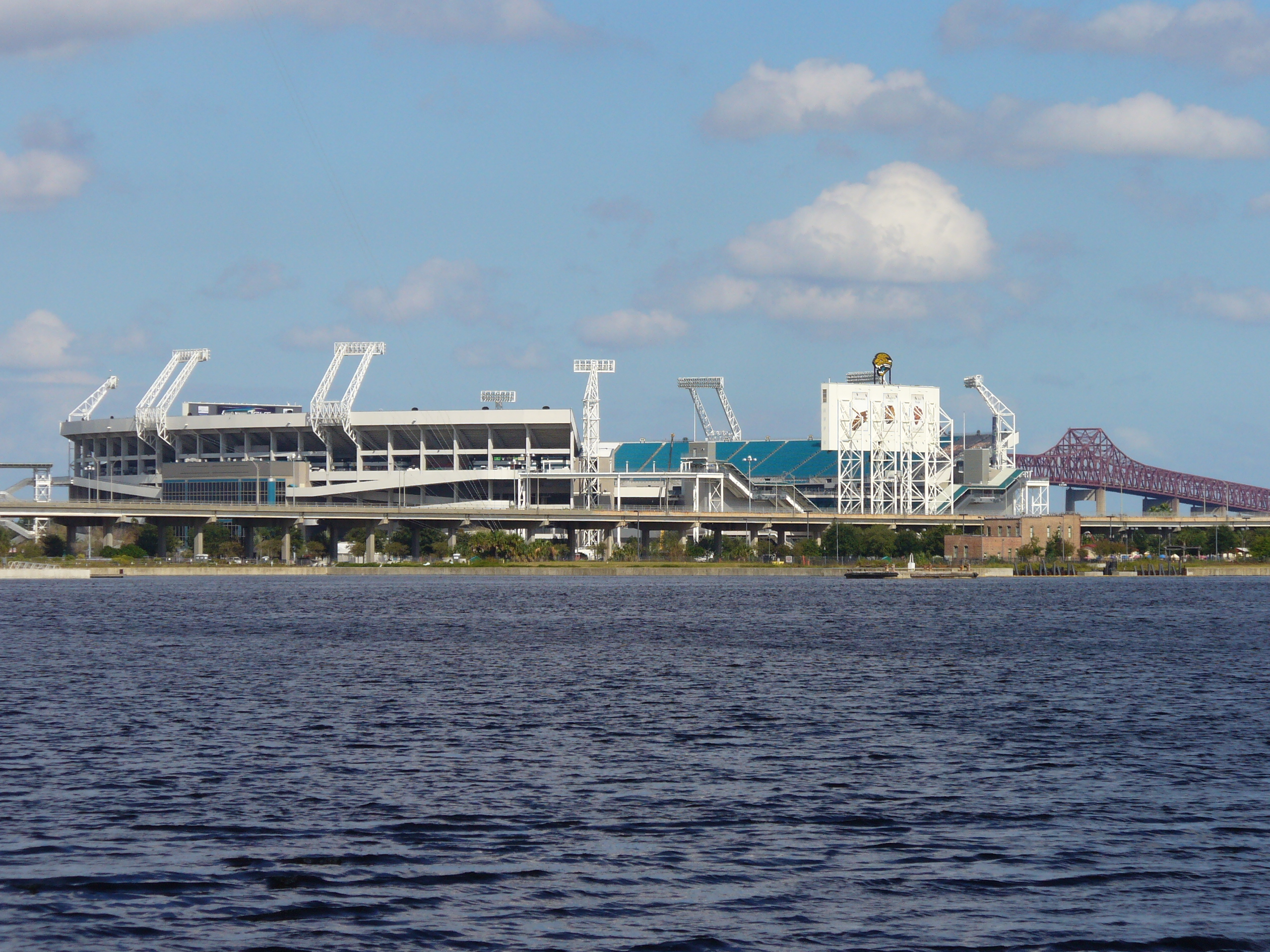
EverBank Stadium in 2008

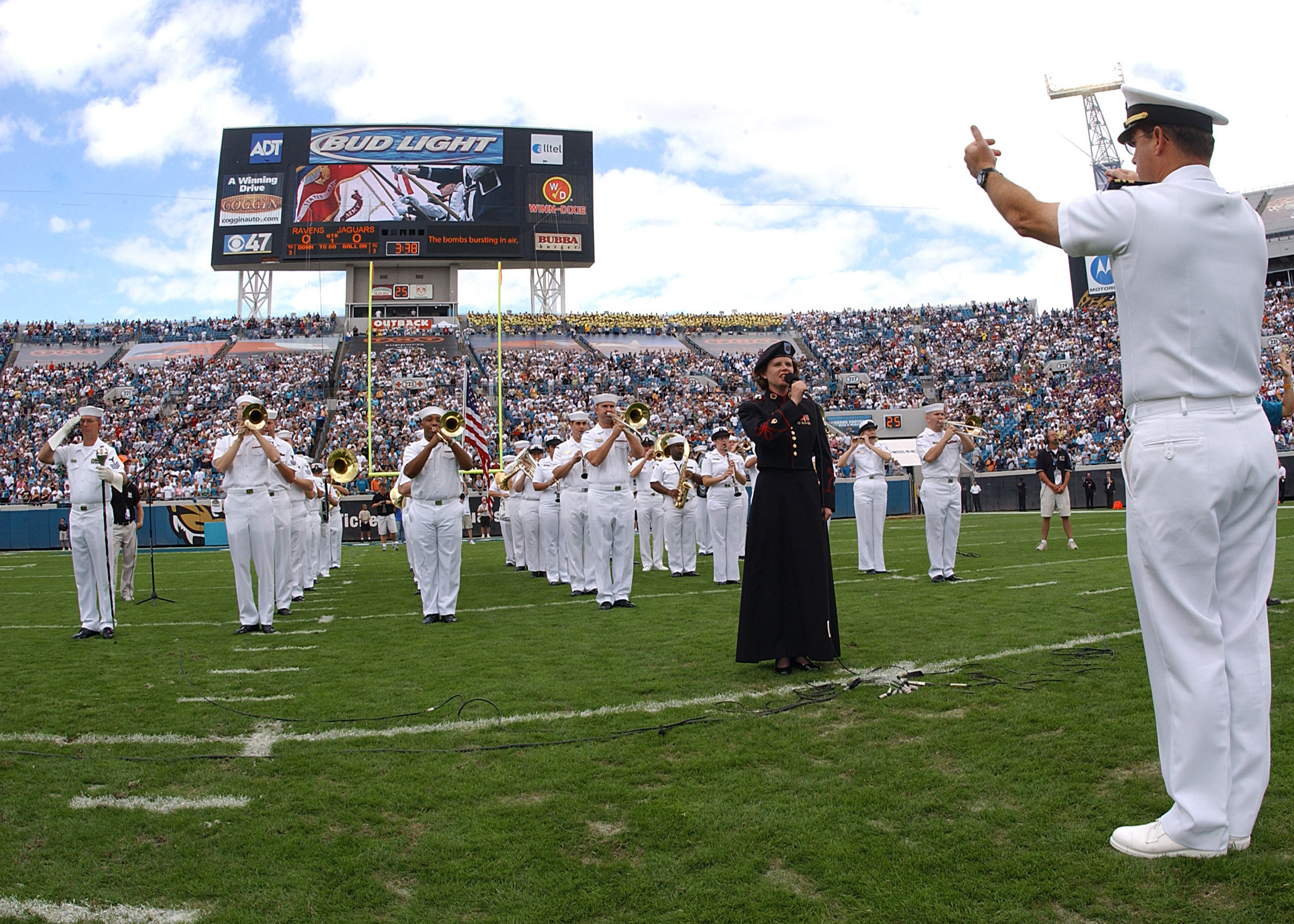
Navy band performing the national anthem before a Jaguars game.

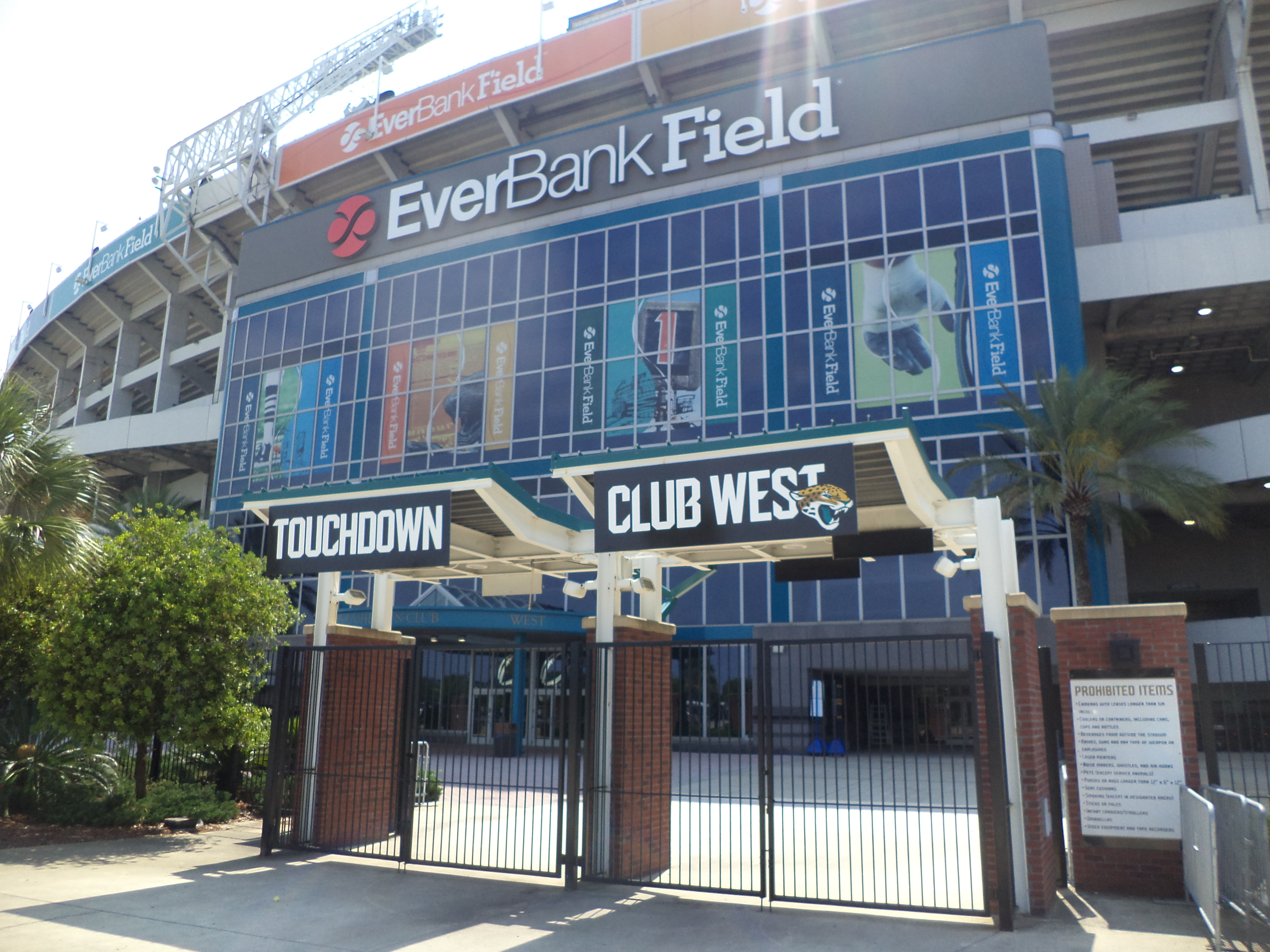
Western entrance into the stadium

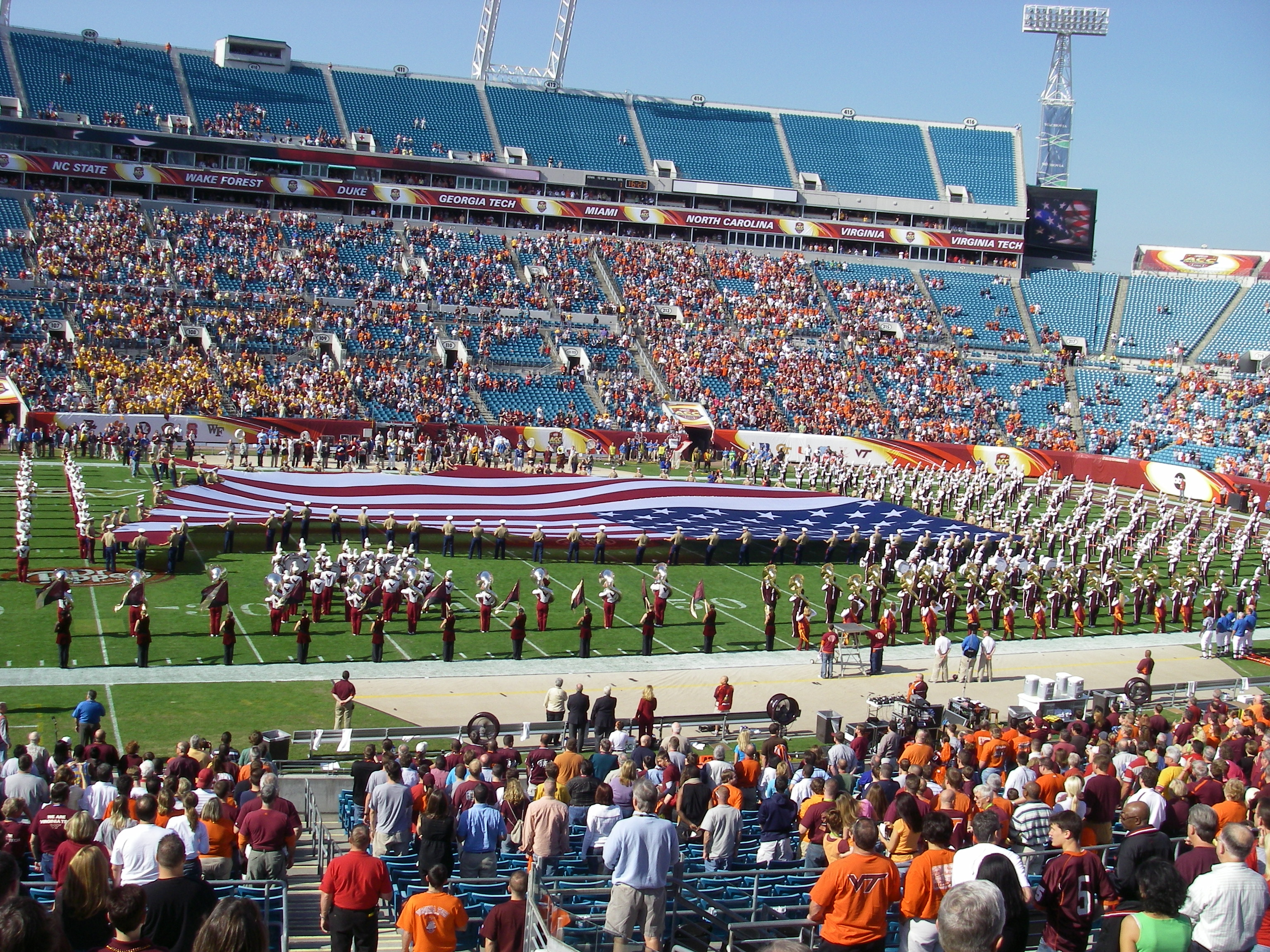
2007 ACC Championship Game

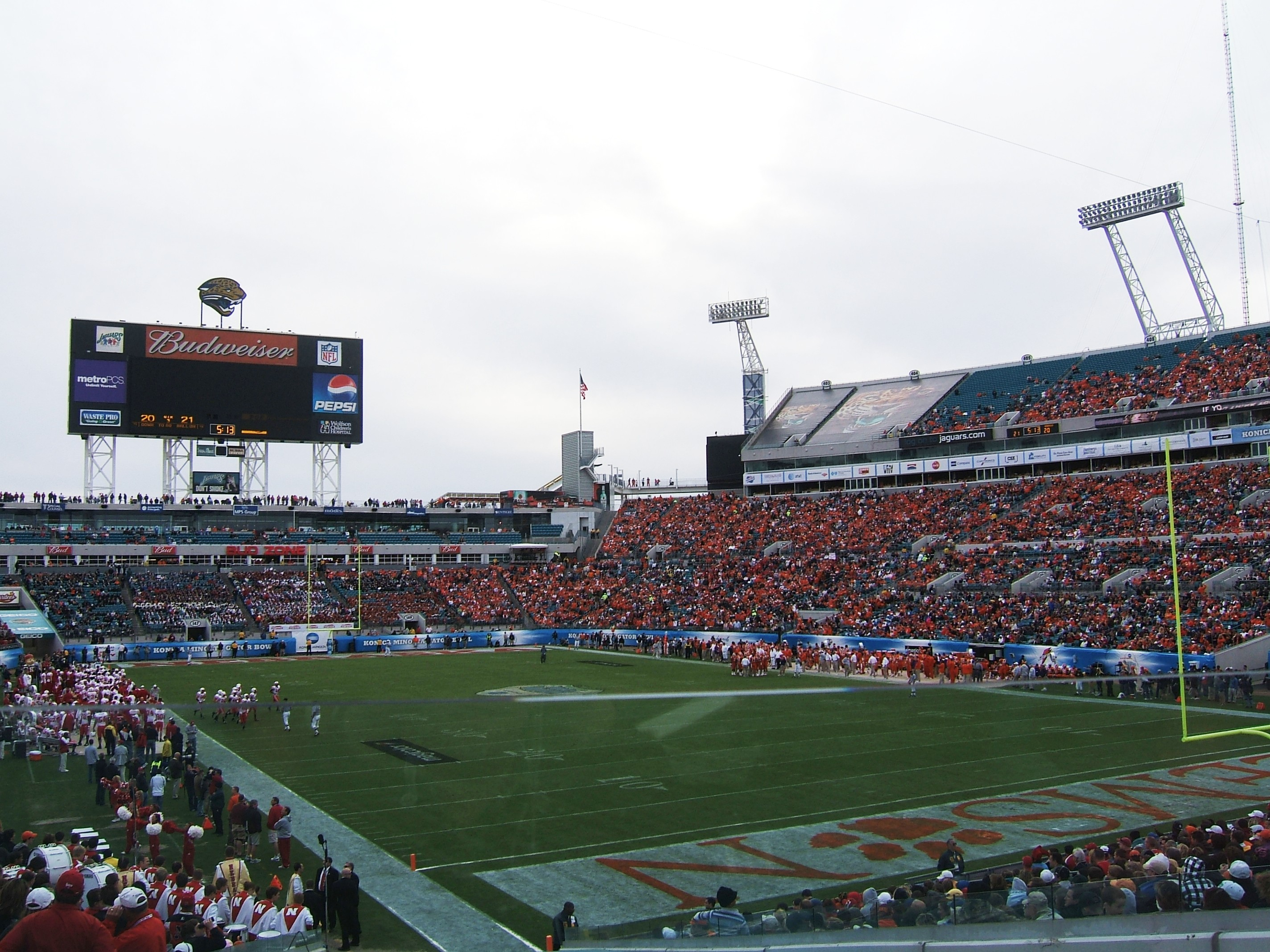
2009 Gator Bowl

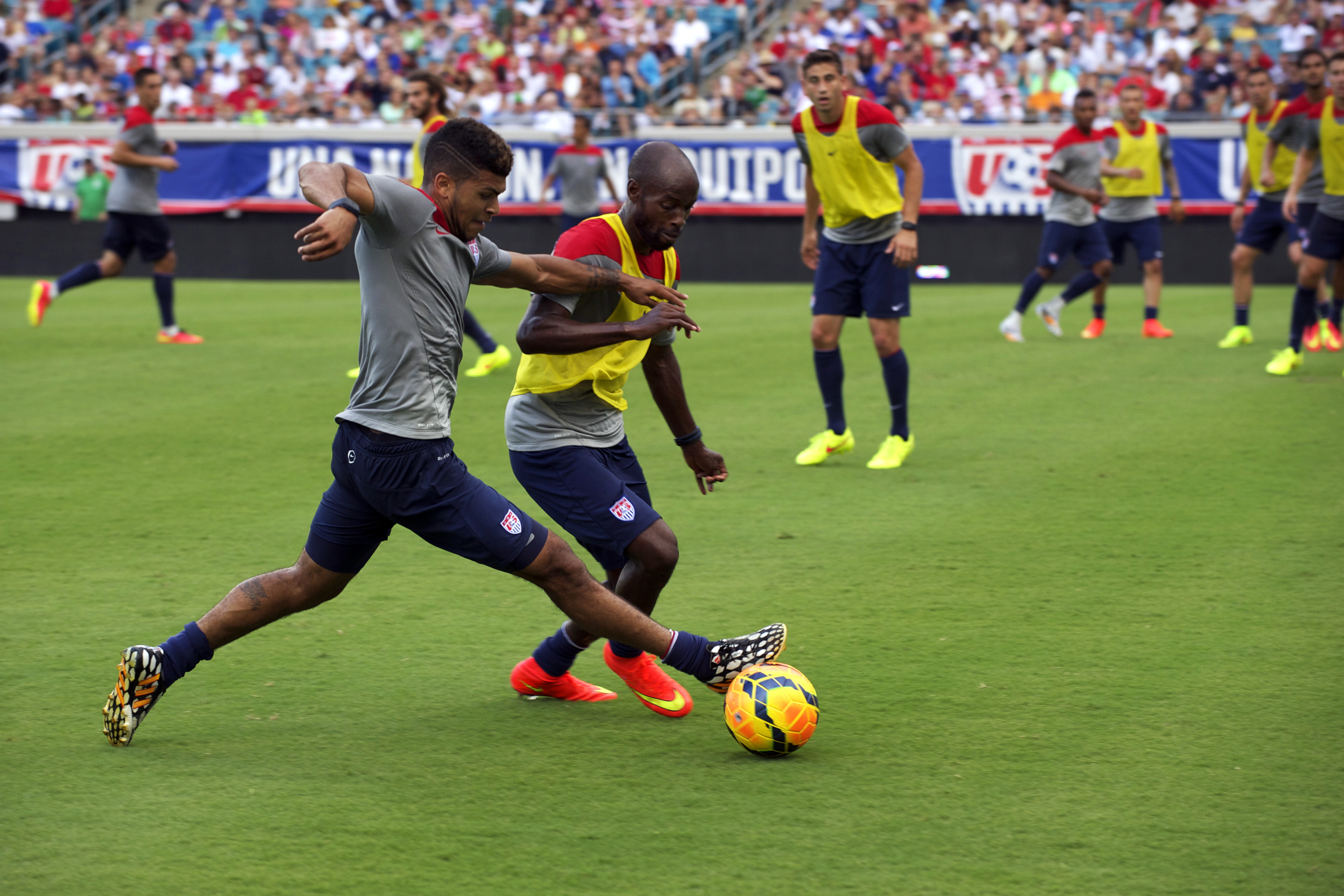
United States men's national soccer team open practice from 2014

== See also ==
- List of American football stadiums by capacity
- List of current NFL stadiums
- Lists of stadiums

Events and tenants
Preceded by Inaugural venue	Home of the Jacksonville Jaguars; 1995 – present	Succeeded by Current
Preceded by Ben Hill Griffin Stadium	Host of the TaxSlayer Bowl; 1995 – present	Succeeded by Current
Preceded by Reliant Stadium	Host of the Super Bowl; 2005 (XXXIX)	Succeeded by Ford Field
Preceded by first stadium	Host of the ACC Championship Game; 2005–2007	Succeeded by Raymond James Stadium
Preceded by Mile High Stadium	Host of AFC Championship Game; 2000	Succeeded by Network Associates Coliseum
