= SFNB =

SFNB may refer to:

- Seattle-First National Bank
- Security First Network Bank
