= EverBank =

American diversified financial services company

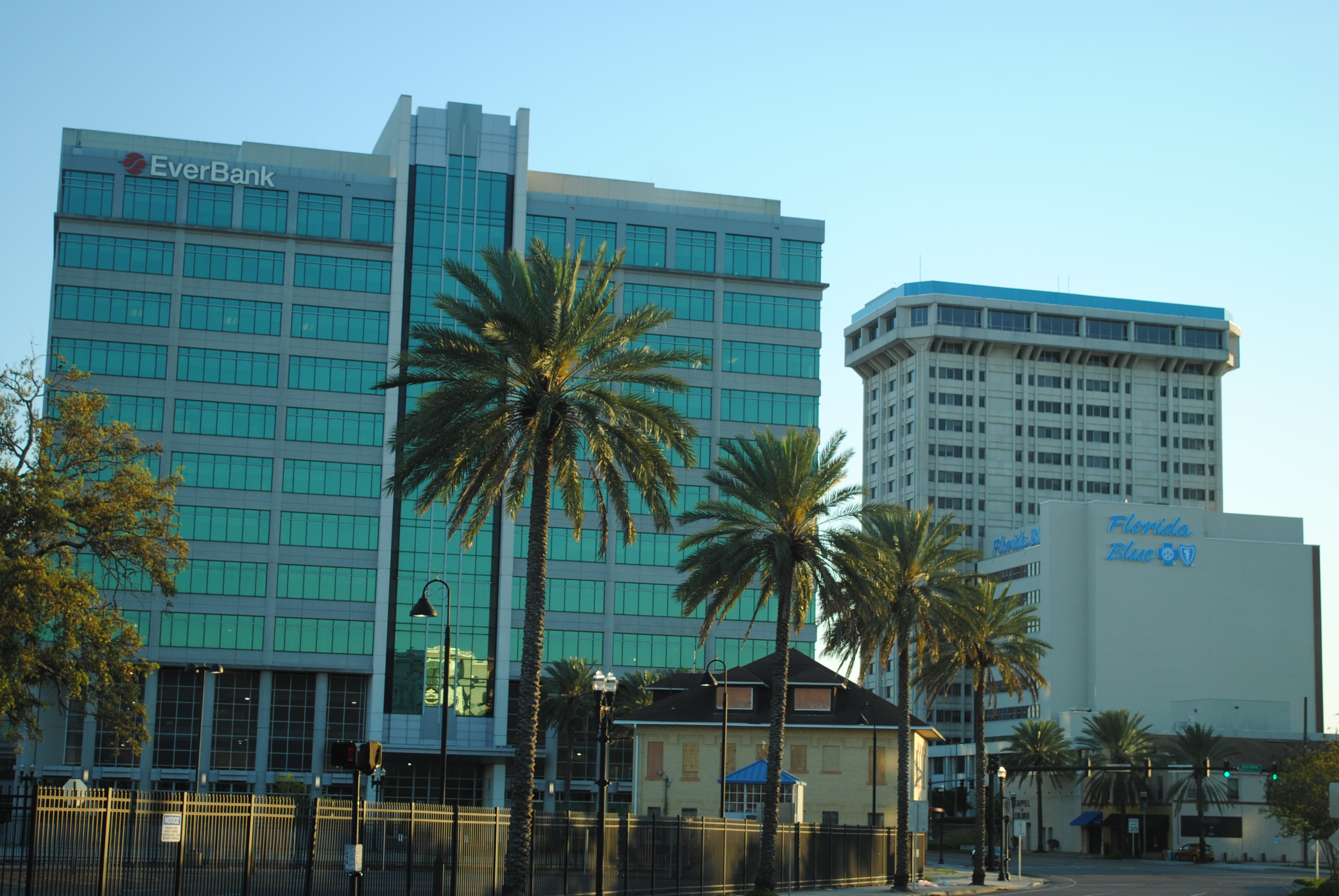
- Corporate headquarters on the left in the Brooklyn area of Downtown Jacksonville
- Type: Subsidiary
- Industry: Banking, Financial services
- Predecessors: First Alliance Bank
- Founded: October 1, 1998; 28 years ago in Jacksonville, Florida, U.S.
- Founder: Frank Trotter, Rob Foregger, Vincent Amato, and David Galland
- Headquarters: EverBank Plaza; 301 W Bay St; Jacksonville, Florida, U.S.
- Area served: Worldwide
- Key people: Greg Seibly, CEO; David DePillo, President
- Products: Consumer banking, corporate banking, credit cards, finance and insurance, foreign currency exchange, investment banking, private equity, wealth management
- Total assets: ▲US$44.4 billion (2025)
- Owner: Funds managed by Stone Point Capital, Warburg Pincus, Reverence Capital Partners, Sixth Street Partners, and Bayview Asset Management as well as TIAA.
- Website: www.everbank.com

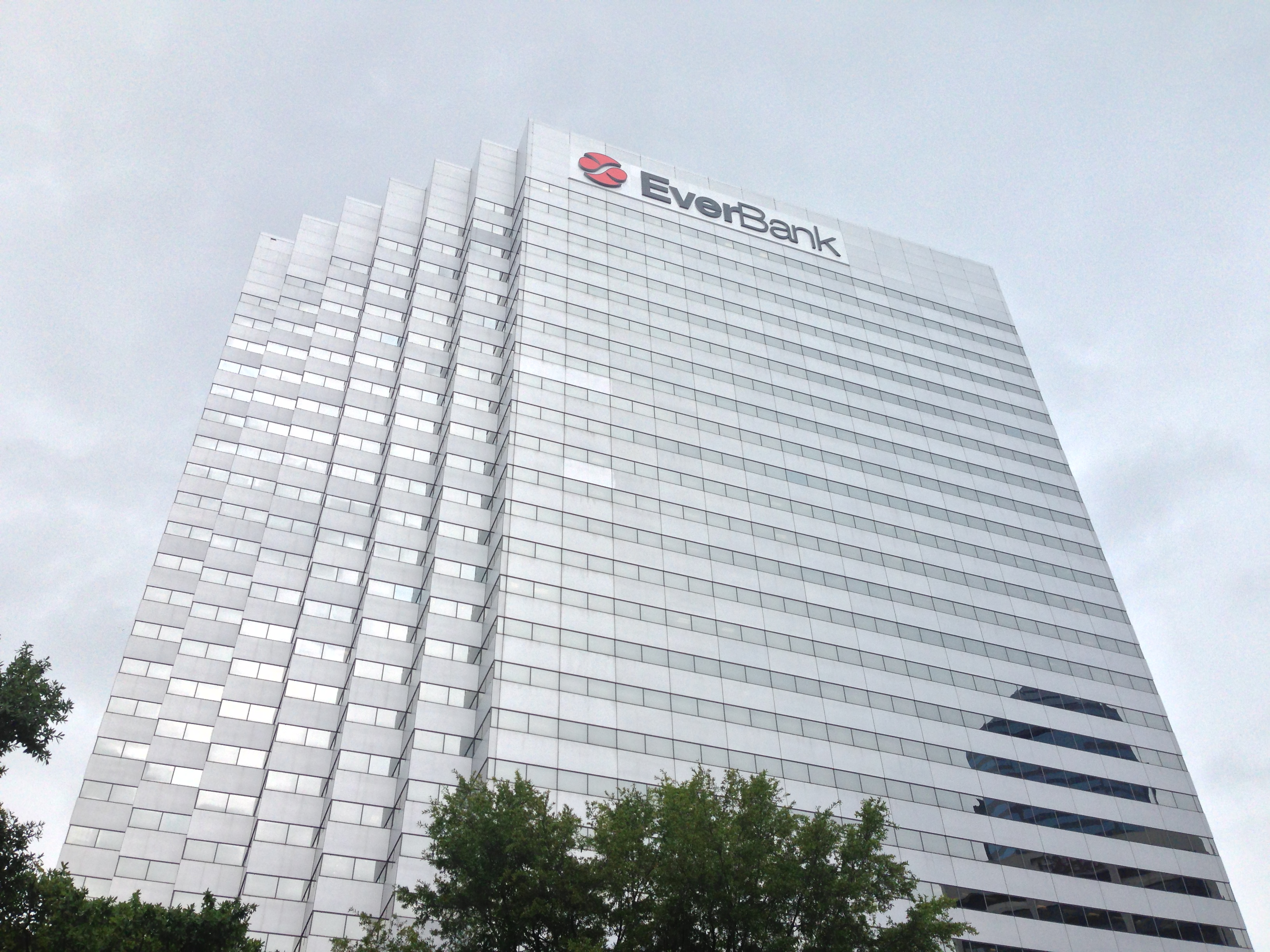
EverBank Center, Downtown Jacksonville

Old EverBank logo

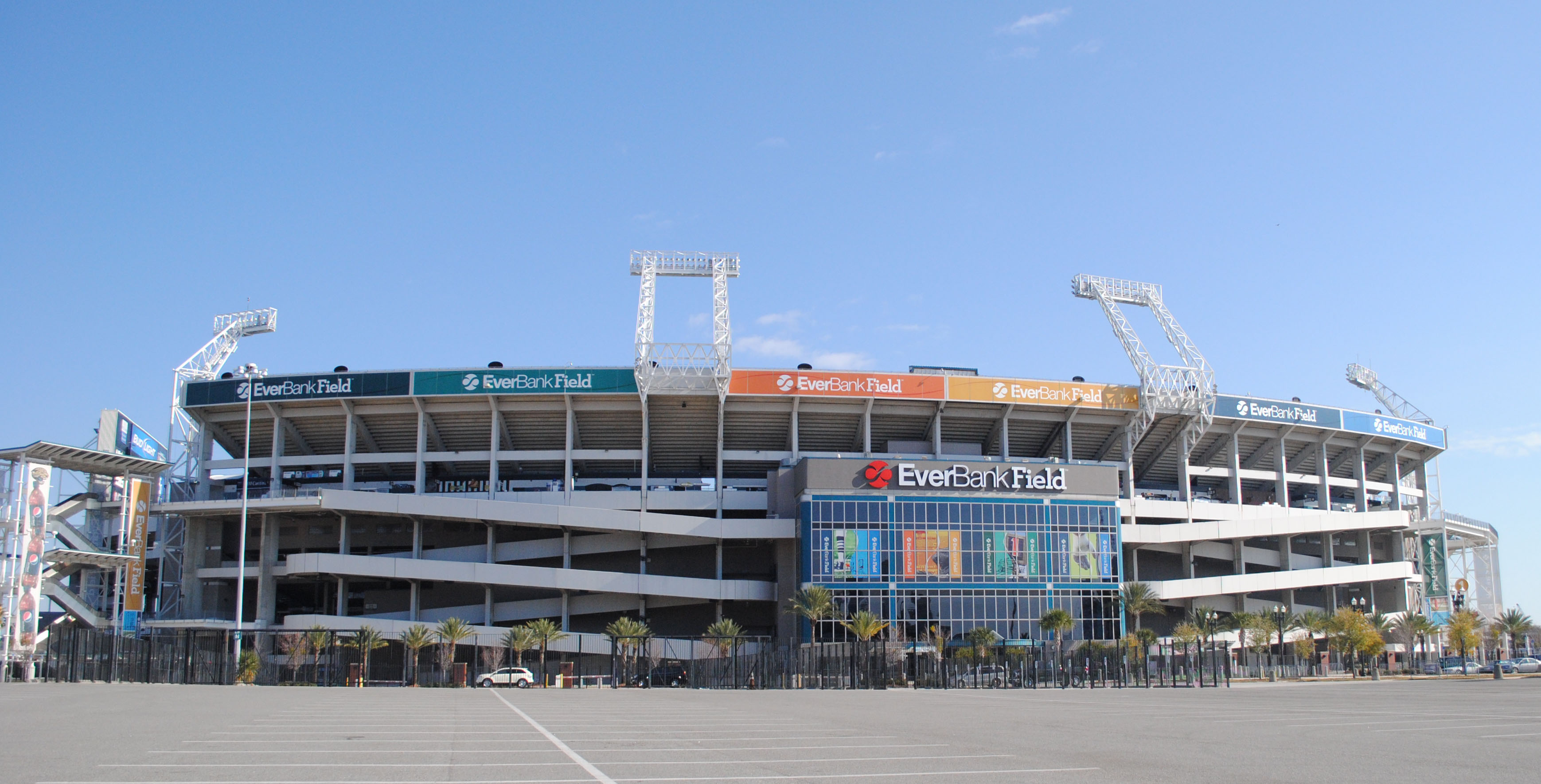
EverBank Field showing the EverBank signage in 2011

EverBank is an American diversified financial services company providing banking and investment services, primarily via a direct bank. It is based in Jacksonville, Florida. It is owned by funds managed by Stone Point Capital, Warburg Pincus, Reverence Capital Partners, Sixth Street Partners, and Bayview Asset Management as well as TIAA. It is on the list of largest banks in the United States.

Since 2010, the company has owned the naming rights to EverBank Stadium, under an agreement scheduled to expire in 2024.

== History ==
While the roots of EverBank stretch back to 1961, the current incarnation was formed in 1994 when Chairman Robert Clements led an investor group in acquiring Jacksonville, Florida–based Alliance Mortgage Company.

In 1998, Alliance Mortgage Company formed First Alliance Bank in Jacksonville, Florida.

In 1999, Frank Trotter and partners led an investor group to found EverBank. In April 1999, EverBank acquired the world currency division of Mercantile Bancorporation.

In 2001, First Alliance Bank acquired Marine National Bank, also of Jacksonville, Florida.

On November 5, 2002, First Alliance Bank acquired EverBank.

On February 2, 2004, the company took the name EverBank.

In May 2007, EverBank agreed to acquire NetBank's direct banking and small business financing divisions and mortgage servicing portfolio; however, in September 2007, Everbank terminated the agreement, claiming that NetBank had been unable to comply with provisions regarding certain cash levels due to the 2007 subprime mortgage financial crisis. Instead, EverBank acquired $700 million of NetBank's assets.

In May 2008, MetLife acquired the bank's reverse mortgage division.

In 2009, during the 2008–2011 Icelandic financial crisis, a class action lawsuit was filed against EverBank in the Superior Court of California on behalf of purchasers of certificates of deposit denominated in Icelandic Krona from the bank. The lawsuit alleged that EverBank, against the instructions of its customers, closed the accounts at an unreasonable exchange rate, resulting in a loss of much of the purchasers' principal. Judge Richard Seeborg in San Jose granted EverBank summary judgment on all of the lawsuit's claims, finding that EverBank did not act in bad faith and had the discretion to close the accounts due to exposure of approximately $12 million in losses had the currency not recovered. A federal appeals court remanded the case to district court in 2014 to determine if the bank breached the terms and conditions when it returned the value of the accounts to the class members. The case was settled in 2016.

In February 2010, EverBank acquired Tygris Commercial Finance Group, Inc., a provider of financing for business equipment.

In May 2010, EverBank acquired all the deposits, substantially all of the assets, and certain liabilities of the Bank of Florida from the Federal Deposit Insurance Corporation, bringing its total assets to approximately $11.5 billion.

In February 2012, the bank agreed to acquire the warehouse finance business of MetLife.

In October 2012, EverBank acquired Business Property Lending from GE Capital for $2.4 billion.

On June 9, 2017, TIAA acquired the bank; it was later renamed TIAA Bank.

In August 2023, the bank was acquired by funds managed by Stone Point Capital, Warburg Pincus, Reverence Capital Partners, Sixth Street Partners, and Bayview Asset Management; the name was returned to EverBank.

Also in August 2023, the bank paid $8.5 million to settle a class action lawsuit alleging failure to pay overtime wages; loan officers received an average of $17,000 each.

In April 2025, EverBank Financial Corp completed the acquisition of Sterling Bank and Trust, F.S.B., a publicly traded bank headquartered in Southfield, Michigan. The integration brought Sterling's operations and financial centers in California and New York City under the EverBank brand.

In September 2026, EverBank Financial Corp. agreed to merge with WaFd, Inc. in a transaction valued at approximately US$3.9 billion. The transaction is expected to close in 2027, subject to shareholder and regulatory approvals.
