= S1 Corporation =

American software company, 1994–2011

- Type: Public
- Traded as: Nasdaq: SONE
- Industry: Financial software
- Predecessor: Technology division of Security First Network Bank
- Founded: 1994
- Defunct: 2011
- Fate: Acquired by ACI Worldwide, Inc.
- Headquarters: Norcross, Georgia, United States
- Key people: Johann Dreyer (last CEO)
- Products: Payment processing software, ATM software, internet banking

S1 Corporation was an American software company based in Norcross, Georgia, specialising in payment processing and financial services software for automated teller machines, retail point of sale and online banking applications, serving banks, retailers and credit unions. S1 Corporation was acquired by competing payment software company ACI Worldwide, Inc. in 2011 for approximately $516 million.

== History ==
S1 Corporation originated as the technology division of Security First Network Bank, one of the first internet banks in the United States. It was spun off as an independent company, with James (Chip) S. Mahan III as chief executive officer from 1994. Mahan was succeeded in 2001 by Jaime Ellertson, who worked until 2005, after which Mahan was reappointed. Johann Dreyer, formerly CEO of Mosaic Software, became S1's last chief executive in 2006 and worked until the ACI Worldwide acquisition.

In 2004, S1 acquired South African banking software firm Mosaic Software. In March 2010, it acquired PM Systems Corporation, an internet banking company.

In 2011, S1 Corporation attempted to acquire Israeli banking services firm Fundtech Ltd, but private equity firm GTCR secured Fundtech instead. ACI Worldwide, Inc. subsequently made three successive acquisition bids for S1 before the deal was agreed. The acquisition, completed in October 2011, valued S1 at $9.95 per share, with a total transaction value of $515.7 million.
