= BASE24 =

Applications that support payments by financial institutions

- Developer: ACI Worldwide
- Operating system: Cross-platform
- Platform: HP NonStop, z/OS, UNIX, Linux
- License: Proprietary
- Website: www.aciworldwide.com

BASE24 is a series of applications produced by ACI Worldwide that support payment systems used by large financial institutions.

== History ==
ACI was founded in Omaha, Nebraska in 1975 and developed software for NonStop server computers adopted by banks and stock exchanges.

ACI states that early projects involved systems for ATMs and other high-uptime banking systems and that this work led to the first global product, BASE24.

ACI reports that its early customers were in the United States and that an Australian bank became a customer in 1981, being a first foreign customer. By 1986, the company had 131 customers in 14 countries.

The company became public in 1995, adopting the name ACI Worldwide in 1997.

== BASE24-atm ==
BASE24-atm is an EFT processing and switching system that provides ATM support and management including transaction routing and authorization, electronic data interchange, settlement, reporting, network control, and stored-value card functionality.

== BASE24-eps ==
BASE24-eps, formerly BASE24-es, is a payment engine that the financial payments industry uses. It is used to acquire, authenticate, route, switch, and authorize financial transactions across multiple channels. It is supported by mainframe computer platforms including z/OS, HP NonStop (Tandem), UNIX (IBM pSeries, Sun Sparc) and Linux (x86_64).

== BASE24-infobase ==
BASE24-infobase is used to collect ATM transactions, including EFT payments, and distribute operational data, such as automated software updates. It operates on HP NonStop and is able to receive data from a range of ATMs.

== BASE24-pos ==
BASE24-pos is a data integrity support application. It is supported by HP NonStop servers. It has a Stored Value Module component that provides online issuance and validation of stored-value card data. It also has an ACI Commerce Gateway component which serves as a firewall between internal servers and the Internet or other payment networks.
