= ACI Worldwide =

American payment systems company

ACI Worldwide Inc.

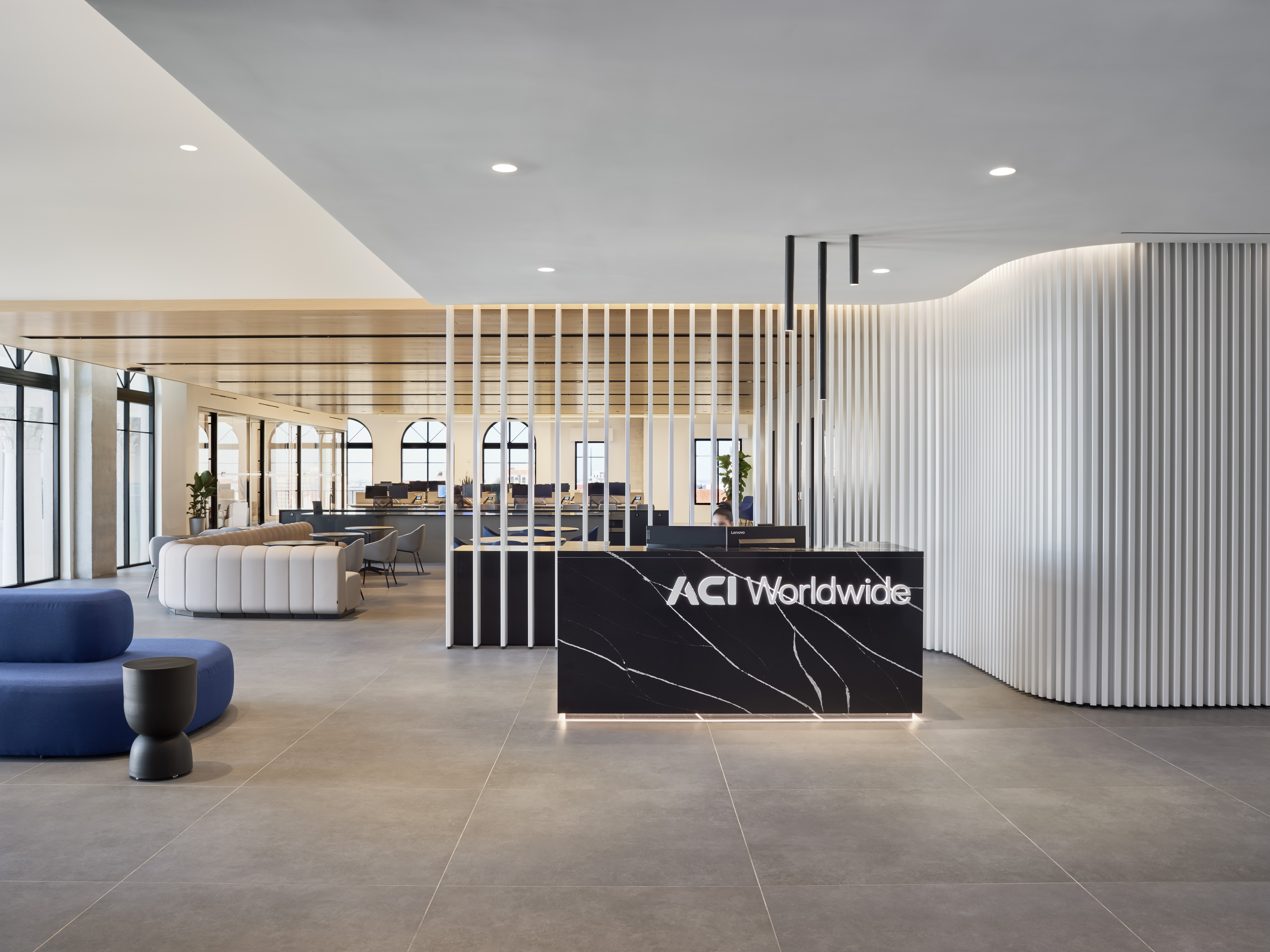
- Type: Public
- Traded as: Nasdaq: ACIW; S&P 600 Component
- Industry: Digital payments software; Financial services; Payment processor
- Founded: 1975; 51 years ago, in Omaha, Nebraska, U.S.
- Headquarters: Elkhorn, Nebraska, United States
- Area served: Worldwide
- Key people: Thomas W. Warsop, III (President (corporate title), and CEO); Scott Behrens (CFO); Phil Bruno (CSGO); Dennis Byrnes (Chief Legal and Risk Officer); Erich Litch (CTO); Craig Maki (Chief Development Officer)
- Services: Process and Manage Digital Payments; Enable Omni-Commerce Payments; Present and Process Bill Payments; Manage Fraud and Risk
- Revenue: ▲US$ $1.59 billion (2024)
- Operating income: ▲US$ 308.1 million (2024)
- Net income: ▲US$ 203 million (2024)
- Total assets: ▼US$ 3.02 billion (2024)
- Total equity: ▲US$ 1.4 billion (2024)
- Number of employees: >4,100 (2023)
- Website: aciworldwide.com

ACI Worldwide is a digital payments software company headquartered in Elkhorn, Nebraska, that processes billions of transactions daily equating to trillions of U.S. dollars for customers in 94 countries. Banks, financial institutions, merchants, billers, acquirers, issuers, and other third-party payment service providers use its intelligent solutions to deploy secure payment rails across all channels.

== Partnerships ==
ACI Worldwide has partnered with organizations like AWS, Google, Red Hat, IBM, Mastercard, Visa, and other fintech innovators to enable banks, merchants, and billers to easily and securely accept, transform, and transmit any payment instantly on a platform.

== History ==
ACI was founded in Omaha, Nebraska as Applied Communications Inc, on September 1, 1975, to develop software for communications applications using the new NonStop computers from Tandem Computers. The founders were James Cody, Dave Willadsen, and Dennis Gates. Chuck Hackett, Charly Foglesong, and Mike May began ACI's relationship with Tandem. Early projects involved building systems to handle ATMs and front ends for core banking systems, which led to the launch of the first product, BASE24, in 1982. BASE24 was coined by a salesman to represent "Baseline Software for 24 hour-per-day system operations".

BASE24 was expanded over time to service transactions from other channels, such as POS terminals and bank branch systems. The product portfolio grew to cover functions related to card transactions, such as clearing, settlement and fraud detection. The hardware support for these products was extended to suppliers IBM, HP, Stratus and Sun Microsystems.

In the 1990s, ACI's product range was expanded to cover wholesale banking payments with software for ACH transactions and wire transfers leading to the acquisition of IntraNet, Inc. in 1998, and adding the Money Transfer System product.

Since 1995, ACI has been publicly traded on NASDAQ, initially under the name Transaction Systems Architects (TSA), and, since July 2007, under the name ACI Worldwide, Inc. (ACIW). Prior to that ACI had periods of ownership by US West and Tandem, and as a private company.

=== Acquisitions ===
- 1998: IntraNet, Inc. was acquired by ACI Worldwide's predecessor Transaction Systems Architects, Inc. IntraNet, Inc. manufactured software systems to facilitate electronic payments.
- 2005: S2 Systems signed an agreement to sell substantially all its assets to Transaction Systems Architects, Inc.
- 2005: Restructuring of Transaction Systems Architects, Inc. into a highly focused organization, merging ACI, Insession, and IntraNet into one operating unit under the name ACI Worldwide. The name change became official in July 2007.
- 2006: P&H Solutions Inc., a provider of a Web-based corporate cash management product, was acquired by ACI Worldwide.
- 2006: Electronic Payment Systems AG (eps) was acquired.
- 2007: Stratasoft Sdn Bhd was acquired.
- 2007: Visual WEB Solutions Inc., a financial banking applications company, was acquired.
- 2009: Euronet Essentis was purchased by ACI to expand card issuing and merchant management capabilities
- 2011: The acquisition of ISD Corporation was announced to broaden the functionality of ACI's payments products for retailers.
- 2012: S1 Corporation was acquired to broaden ACI's suite of payment offerings for financial organizations, processors and retailers.
- 2012: North Data Uruguay S.A. was acquired.
- 2012: Distra Pty Ltd was acquired.
- 2013: Online Resources Corporation was acquired.
- 2013: Official Payments Holdings, a provider of electronic bill payment technology, was acquired. The company processed approximately 20 million payments, totaling over $9 billion annually.
- 2013: Profesionales en Transacciones Electronicas S.A. (PTESA) was acquired.
- 2014: An agreement to acquire Retail Decisions (ReD) was announced and completed on August 12, 2014.
- 2015: PAY.ON, which provides white-label hosted payment gateway services, was acquired.
- 2019: ACI enters agreement to acquire Speedpay, Western Union's U.S. bill pay business, for $750 million
- 2019: Walletron was acquired.

=== See also ===
- Payment system
- Payment gateway
- Payment service provider
- Digital banking
- Transaction banking
- Electronic billing
