= Online savings account =

Savings account managed over the Internet

An online savings account (OSA) is a savings account managed and funded primarily on the Internet.

== Features ==
OSAs are often characterized by higher interest rates or lower fees compared with traditional savings accounts. Many high-yield accounts have no minimum balance. Account holders may link their OSAs to external bank accounts for transfers, and some accounts provide ATM cards for direct access to funds.

== Deposits and withdrawals ==
Banks offering OSAs may operate without physical branches, so deposits are commonly made in the US via ACH transfer, check mailing or direct deposit. Withdrawals are typically conducted through ACH transfers to another account or by requesting a check.

== Changes in banking and investing ==
Inflation, recession fears, and stock market fluctuations have encouraged investors to use OSAs to balance their portfolios. In 2005, more than 8.5 million customers opened online savings accounts with leading U.S. banks, and some industry estimates projected that the market could grow from about $250 billion to $400 billion by 2010. In a 2026 survey by the American Bankers Association, 76% of people named online and mobile banking as their preferred method of banking.

== See also ==
- Direct bank
- Online banking

Specific examples:

- HSBC Direct
- ING Direct
