= Direct bank =

Bank that only offers services remotely

A direct bank (sometimes called a branch-less bank or virtual bank) is a bank that offers its services only via the Internet, mobile app, email, and other electronic means, often including telephone, online chat, and mobile check deposit. A direct bank has no branch network. It may offer access to an independent banking agent network and may also provide access via ATMs (often through interbank network alliances), and bank by mail. Direct banks eliminate the costs of maintaining a branch network while offering convenience to customers who prefer digital technology. Direct banks provide some but not all of the services offered by physical banks.

Direct bank transactions are conducted entirely online. Direct banks are not the same as "online banking". Online banking is an Internet-based option offered by regular banks.

In the United States, direct banks are defined as online/branchless institutions with federal banking charters, with either the Federal Reserve Board, the Office of the Comptroller of the Currency or the Federal Deposit Insurance Corporation (FDIC) as their primary regulator. Many direct banks are insured by the FDIC and offer the same level of protection for the customers' funds as traditional banks, although it is important to verify if this is true. As of 2022, 27% of banking customers in the United States use a direct (i.e., online-only) bank.

In the United States, direct banks are distinctly different from neobanks. Neobanks are online-only banking providers without federal banking charters, instead providing a website while relying on a partner bank to hold funds. Often, the partner banks will be Durbin exempt. Their customers tend to be younger people who are more price sensitive to bank fees.

== History ==
One of the world's first direct banks was First Direct, which launched telephone banking in the United Kingdom on 1 October 1989. A subsidiary of the then Midland Bank, it pioneered the concepts of no branches and 24-hour service through a call center. The commercialization of the Internet in the early 1990s was the biggest driver in the creation of fully direct banking models.

In the 1990s, internet-only banks or "virtual banks" appeared. These banks did not have a traditional banking infrastructure, such as a branch network, a cost-saving feature that allowed many of them to offer savings accounts with higher interest rates and loans with lower interest rates than most traditional banks. However, there was initial consumer hesitation in conducting monetary transactions over the Internet, especially with an entity that they could not deal with face-to-face.

One of the first direct banks in the United States was the Security First Network Bank (SFNB), launched in October 1995, and was the first direct bank to be insured by the Federal Deposit Insurance Corporation. While SFNB did not make much profit in its initial years, it demonstrated that the concept of direct banking could work.

Some direct banks focused only on online savings accounts, providing higher interest rates than traditional banks for customers who were happy to only have access to their account on the internet. One of the first and most successful adopters of this was ING Direct that launched Tangerine Bank in Canada in 1997, expanding this to the United Kingdom, Australia, and the United States before its owner sold them around 2010.

Asia's first direct bank was finatiQ, a division of the Oversea-Chinese Banking Corporation (OCBC) of Singapore, launched in April 2000. It was shut down in 2011 and its operations merged into the mainstream banking structure with its parent OCBC saying that "Internet Banking has since become a core part of OCBC Bank's multi-channel strategy – which also encompasses branches, ATMs and Mobile Banking".

The direct bank model was used by many of the challenger banks created in the UK during 2015–2018.

== See also ==
- Banking agent
- Online savings account
