= TIAA =

Financial services organization

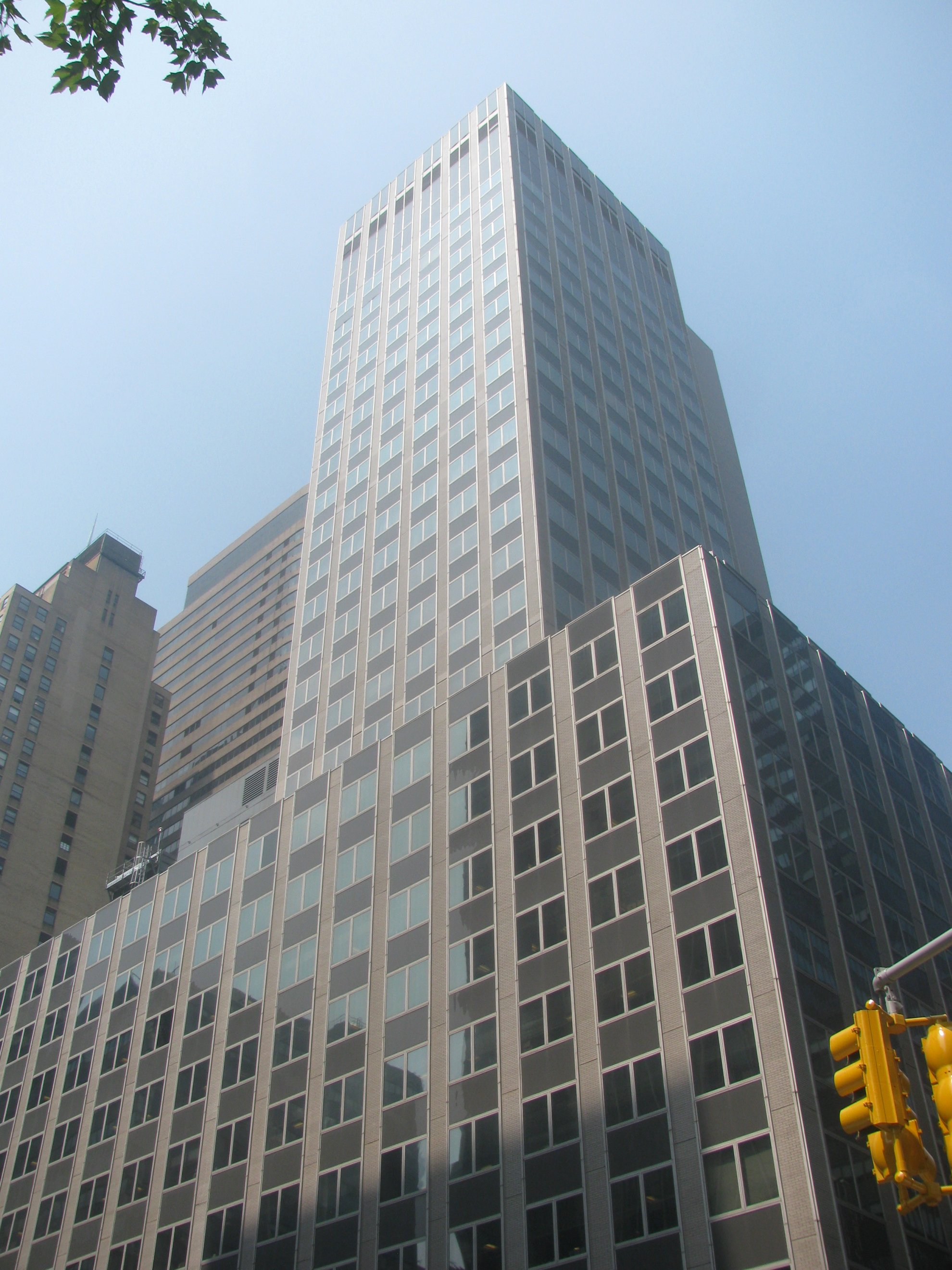
- Headquarters at 730 Third Avenue
- Type: Non-profit corporation owning subsidiaries for-profit
- Founded: 1918; 108 years ago
- Founder: Andrew Carnegie
- Headquarters: 730 Third Avenue, New York City, United States
- Key people: Thasunda Duckett; President and (CEO); Roger W. Ferguson Jr. (former CEO)
- Products: Financial services
- Revenue: US$40.454 billion (2020)
- Net income: US$1.492 billion (FY 2016)
- AUM: ▲US$1.3 trillion (2020)
- Total assets: ▲US$615.042 billion (2020)
- Total equity: ▲US$38.871 billion (2020)
- Number of employees: ▼16,533 (2020)
- Subsidiaries: Nuveen, TIAA Bank, Westchester Group
- Website: tiaa.org

The Teachers Insurance and Annuity Association of America-College Retirement Equities Fund (TIAA, formerly TIAA-CREF) is an American financial services organization that is a private provider of financial retirement services in the academic, research, medical, cultural and governmental fields. TIAA is listed on the Fortune 100 and serves over 5 million active and retired employees participating at more than 15,000 institutions and has $1 trillion in combined assets under management with holdings in more than 50 countries (as of December 31, 2017).

== Profile ==
Long organized as a tax-exempt non-profit organization, a 1997 tax bill removed TIAA's tax exemption. It is now organized as a non-profit organization, the TIAA Board of Governors, with taxable subsidiaries; all profits are returned to policyholders.

TIAA bought its Manhattan headquarters building, 730 Third Avenue, in 1955. It has major offices in Denver, Colorado; Charlotte, North Carolina; Chicago, Illinois; and Frisco, Texas; as well as 70 local offices throughout the U.S. In 2018, TIAA ranked 84th on Fortune's list of the 500 largest corporations in America. As of 2017, TIAA is the largest global investor in agriculture, the second-largest grower of wine grapes in the United States by acreage, and the third-largest commercial real estate manager in the world.

== History ==
In 1918, Andrew Carnegie and his Carnegie Foundation for the Advancement of Teaching, under the leadership of Henry S. Pritchett, created the Teachers Insurance and Annuity Association of America (TIAA), a fully funded system of pensions for professors. Funding was provided by a combination of grants from the foundation and the Carnegie Corporation of New York, as well as ongoing contributions from participating institutions and individuals. The policyholders voted in 1921 to implement policyholder representation on the TIAA board so that educators would have a role in running the organization.

TIAA's main investment/insurance product is the TIAA Traditional, which offers a contractually guaranteed return on principal and, at the discretion of the board of trustees on a periodic basis, additional profit/dividend interest over the guaranteed return. From the relatively illiquid and stable, long-term investments of its general account, TIAA has been able to consistently add some dividends to TIAA Traditional contributions since 1948.

=== Annuities and real estate ===
In 1952, TIAA created the College Retirement Equities Fund (CREF) a variable annuity, in order to diversify its retirement funds.

In 1995, TIAA introduced the TIAA Real Estate account, also a variable annuity, but more stable than equity investments and more flexible than TIAA Traditional.

=== 21st century ===
On June 15, 2007, TIAA became one of the first U.S. companies to voluntarily adopt, and the first to implement, a policyholder advisory vote on executive compensation policy.

On February 22, 2016, TIAA-CREF rebranded as simply TIAA as part of a new marketing and imaging campaign. CMO Connie Weaver explained that the old name was perceived by customers as being complicated, and that the new branding scheme was meant to portray a simpler and friendlier image of the organization.

Thasunda Brown Duckett was appointed president and CEO of TIAA in 2021, then becoming one of the two Black women leading a Fortune 500 company.

==== Environmental Impacts ====
In May 2021, TIAA announced its net zero by 2050 commitment for the General Account. In 2022, TIAA’s annual climate report, “Ensuring Our Future,” stated that TIAA views climate risk as investment risk. A November 2022 report from the Institute for Energy Economics and Financial Analysis (IEEFA) asserts that TIAA’s failure to divest its fossil fuel holdings to clear its portfolio of financial and environmental risk is strategically unsound.

On October 19, 2022, nearly 300 TIAA clients filed a complaint with the UN-supported Principles for Responsible Investment initiative (PRI), asking PRI to remove TIAA from its list of sustainable investors. TIAA is one of the world’s largest fossil fuel investors, with at least $78 billion invested in coal, oil and gas industries. TIAA is the fifth largest holder of coal bonds worldwide with $6.7 billion invested in companies that mine, transport, and burn coal for energy. PRI agreed to review the complaint but dismissed it after internal review.

In March 2024, a group of TIAA clients and university student activists published their response to TIAA sponsoring the Big 10 while utilizing harmful investing practices. The activists stated that land grabs, the spraying of toxic chemicals, and fossil fuel investments are contributing to the climate crisis.

==== Investments and diversification ====
- 2012: Bought Festival Place, a shopping center in Basingstoke, England for £280 million.
- 2013: Purchased a 50% stake in the Grand Canal Shoppes, including the Shoppes at the Palazzo, in Las Vegas, Nevada, for net proceeds of US$410 million as part of a new joint venture with General Growth Properties. GGP will continue to oversee the asset management of the project.
- 2014: Announced that it would acquire Nuveen Investments in a deal valued at $6.25 billion.
- 2016: Announced deal to buy EverBank Financial Corp. for $2.5 billion in cash; completed June 12, 2017. The combined bank's legal entity name is TIAA, FSB. Nearly a year after the acquisition of EverBank, TIAA began rebranding all of its banking activities under the TIAA Bank name on June 4, 2018. In November 2022, TIAA announced plans to sell TIAA Bank to private investors. TIAA Bank changed its name back to EverBank when the transaction was completed.
