= Banking agent =

Entity contracted to provide banking services on behalf of a financial institution

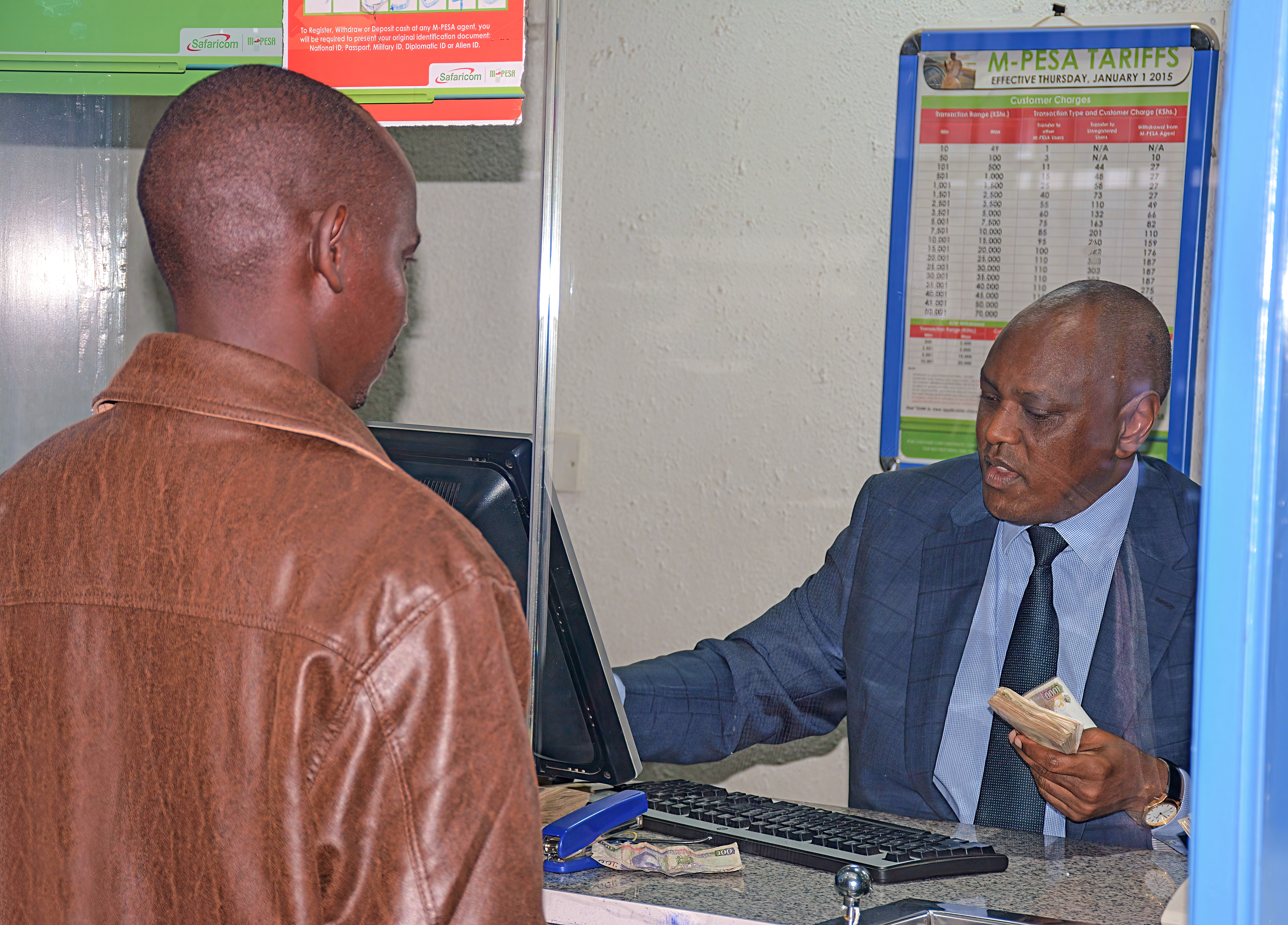
Banking agent serving customer in Kenya.

A banking agent is a retail or postal outlet contracted by a financial institution or a mobile network operator to process clients’ transactions. Rather than a branch teller, it is the owner or an employee of the retail outlet who conducts the transaction and lets clients deposit, withdraw, transfer funds, pay their bills, inquire about an account balance, or receive government benefits or a direct deposit from their employer. Banking agents can be pharmacies, supermarkets, convenience stores, lottery outlets, post offices, and more.

Globally, these retailers and post offices are increasingly utilized as important distribution channels for financial institutions. The points of service range from post offices in the Outback of Australia where clients from all banks can conduct their transactions, to rural France where the bank Crédit Agricole uses corner stores to provide financial services, to small lottery outlets in Brazil at which clients can receive their social payments and access their bank accounts. (Note: For more on the regulatory aspect on banking agent networks, please read CGAP. “Use of Agents in Branchless Banking for the Poor: Rewards, Risks, and Regulation.” CGAP Focus Note No. 38. CGAP: Washington DC. 2006,)

Banking agents are usually equipped with a combination of point-of-sale (POS) card reader, mobile phone, barcode scanner to scan bills for bill payment transactions, personal identification number (PIN) pads, and sometimes personal computers (PCs) that connect with the bank's server using a personal dial-up or other data connection. Clients that transact at the agent use a magstripe bank card or their mobile phone to access their bank account or e-wallet respectively. Identification of customers is normally done through a PIN, but could also involve biometrics. With regard to the transaction verification, authorization, and settlement platform, banking agents are similar to any other remote bank channel.

Local regulation will determine if financial institutions are allowed to work through retail outlets. Regulators generally determine what kind of, if any, financial institutions are permitted to contract banking agents, what products can be offered at the retail outlets, how financial institutions have to handle cash transport, know your customer requirements, consumer protection, and other operational areas.

== Rationale for banking agents ==
Banking agents help financial institutions to divert existing customers from crowded branches providing a “complementary”, often more convenient channel. Other financial institutions, especially in developing markets, use agents to reach an “additional” client segment or geography. Reaching poor clients in rural areas is often prohibitively expensive for financial institutions since transaction numbers and volumes do not cover the cost of a branch. In such environments banking agents that piggy back on existing retail infrastructure – and lower set up and running cost - can play a vital role in offering many low-income people their first-time access to a range of financial services. Also, low-income clients often feel more comfortable banking at their local store than walking into a marble branch.

Banking agents are the backbone of mobile banking, i.e., performing transactions over a mobile device, most often a mobile phone. To enable clients to convert cash into electronic money and vice versa which can then be sent over their mobile phone, clients will have to visit a branch, automated teller machine (ATM), or banking agent. Especially in remote and rural locations, where cash is still the most important way to pay and transact, a mobile banking service is dependent on banking agents to enable clients to effectively use the services.

Benefits of banking agents
For clients
- Lower transaction cost (closer to client’s home; clients will still visit convenience stores for groceries, etc.); longer opening hours, shorter lines than in branches; more accessible for illiterates and the very poor who might feel intimidated in branches.

For agents
- Increased sales from additional foot-traffic, Differentiation from other businesses, Reputation from affiliation with well-known financial institution, Additional revenue from commissions and incentives.

For financial institutions
- it serves as means to reach unbanked locations, around the globe.
- Increased customer base and market share; Increased coverage and penetration with low-cost solution in areas with potentially less number and volume of transactions; increased revenue from additional investment, interest, and fee income; improved indirect branch productivity by reducing congestion

== Transaction process ==
For the client, there is no difference in accessing his or her bank account at the agent or in a branch or at an ATM. However, besides signing a contract with the financial institution it will be working for, the banking agent also has to open a bank account at the same. In addition, the store has to deposit a certain amount of cash into that account which will serve as the banking agent's “working capital.” In many cases, rather than asking the agent to come up with the cash deposit, the financial institution will extend the store a credit line. The size of the credit line is normally not standardized, but adapted individually to each agent depending on its size, the expected volume of transactions and how long the agent has already been working with the bank. This is how the credit line will be used during each transaction:

- Client withdraws money (“cash-out” transaction): agent account is credited in same amount.
- Client deposits money (“cash-in” transaction): agent account is debited in same amount.

In case the agent's credit line had reached its limits, and the agent's bank account does not have sufficient funds, to cover the received funds, the POS will block and can only be deblocked if the funds have been deposited in the next bank account.

The transaction process for banking services using a bank card is simple:

1. An existing bank client presents his card at the agent and requests a specific transaction and the amount to be withdrawn, deposited, or transferred;
2. The agent selects the type of transaction on the POS device or personal computer, enters the amount, swipes the client's card through the device, and lets the client enter his PIN;
3. A General Packet Radio Service (GPRS), dial up, or satellite communication connects with the bank's server to authorize the transaction;
4. Once the transaction has been authorized, the device prints the client's receipt.

== Banking agent set ups ==
There are principally three ways that banks can set up their equipment and marketing material within a store:

=== Cashier ===
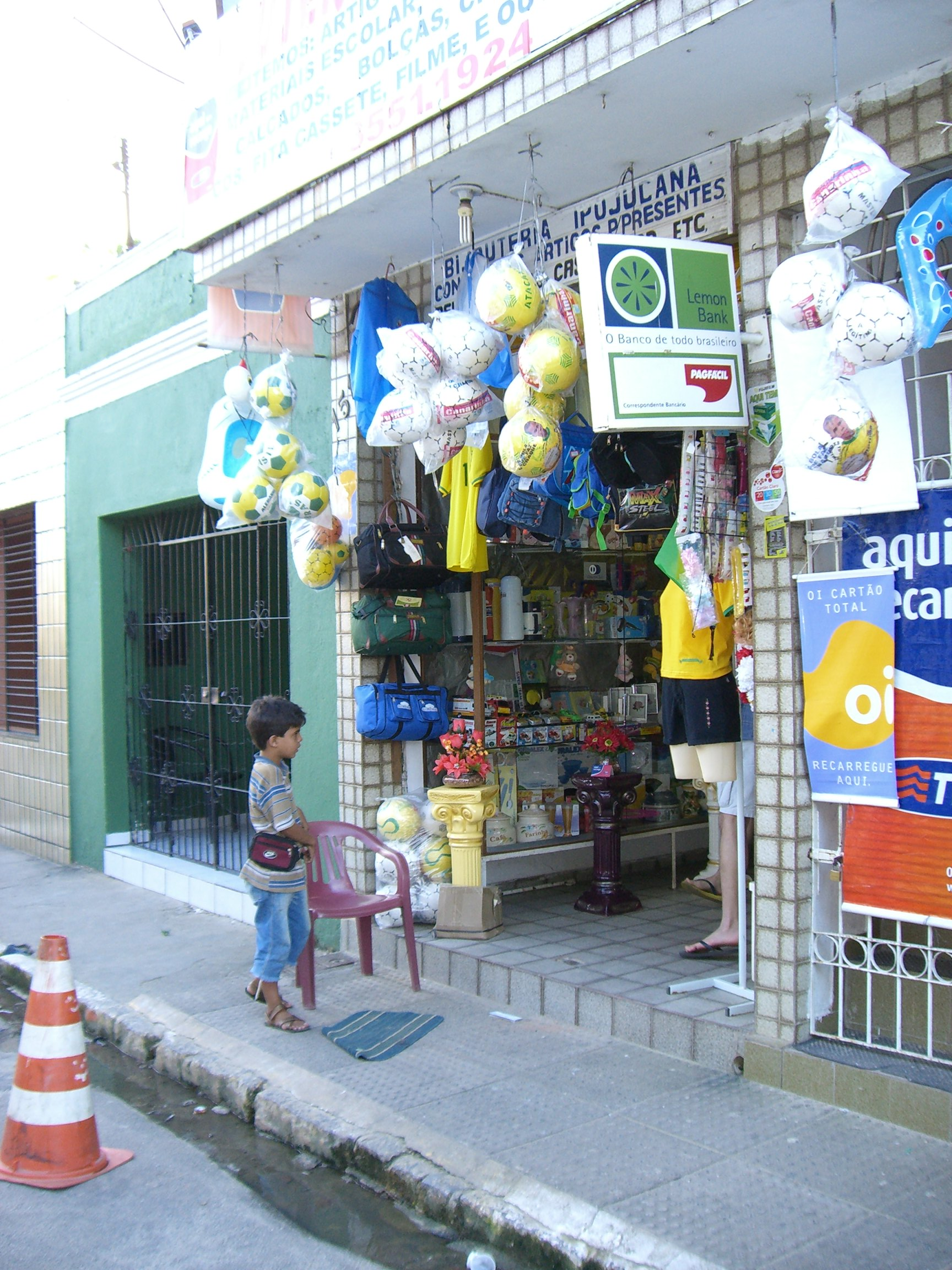
Cashier set up: Lemon Bank agent in small shop in Brazil

When transaction volumes are relatively low, a banking agent's staff may process banking transactions in addition to their normal sales. The banking equipment is located behind the store's general cashier. Posters and marketing material may be limited to a small display next to the EFTPOS terminal and a small sign outside the store.

=== Stand ===
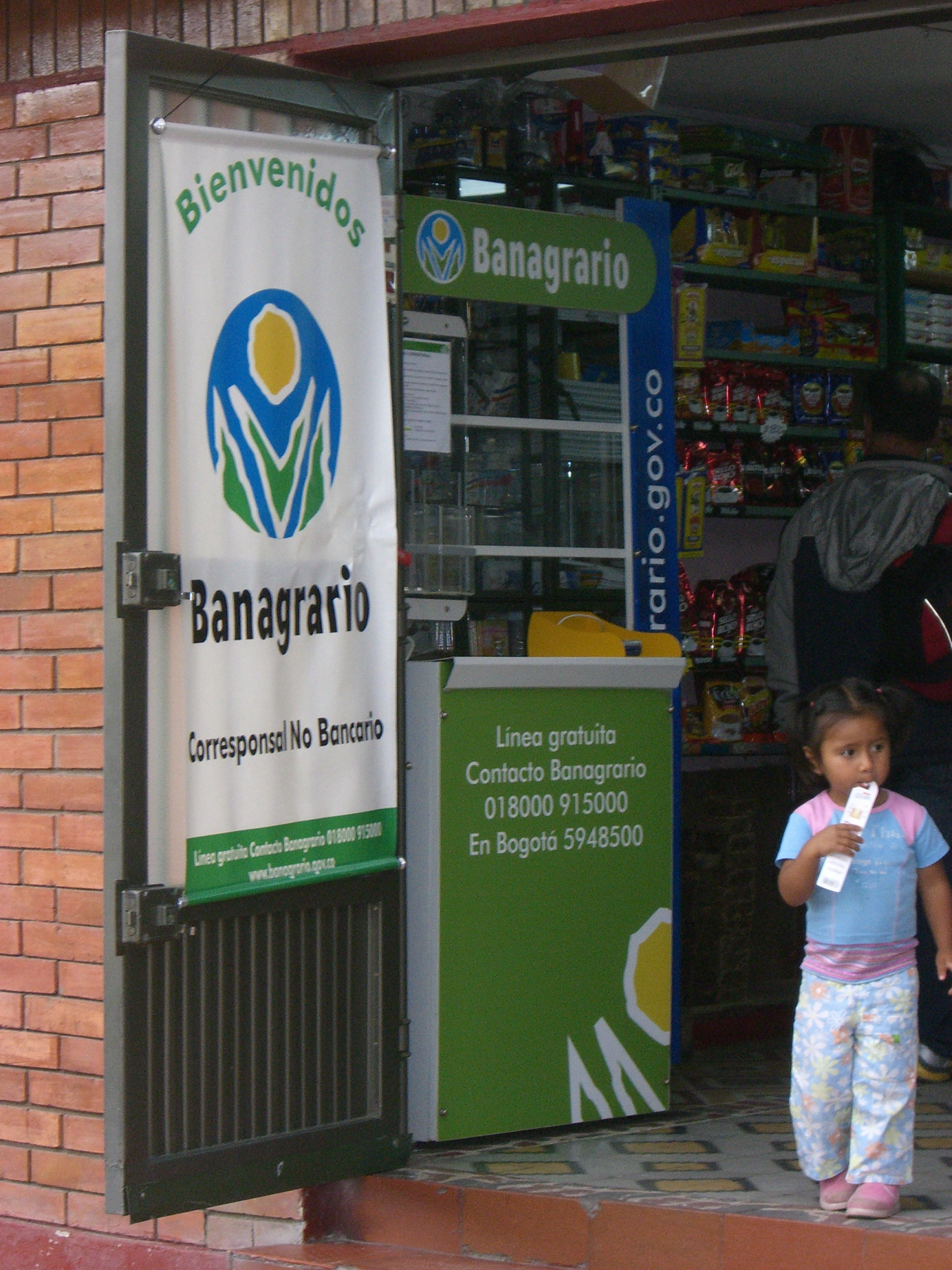
Stand set up: Banagrario banking agent in Colombia

If transaction volumes justify it, a banking agent may set up a stand within a store with dedicated staff. Some financial institutions prefer this set up since clients do not feel as much as “banking” in a store and the bank's brand is much more visible.

=== Dedicated store ===
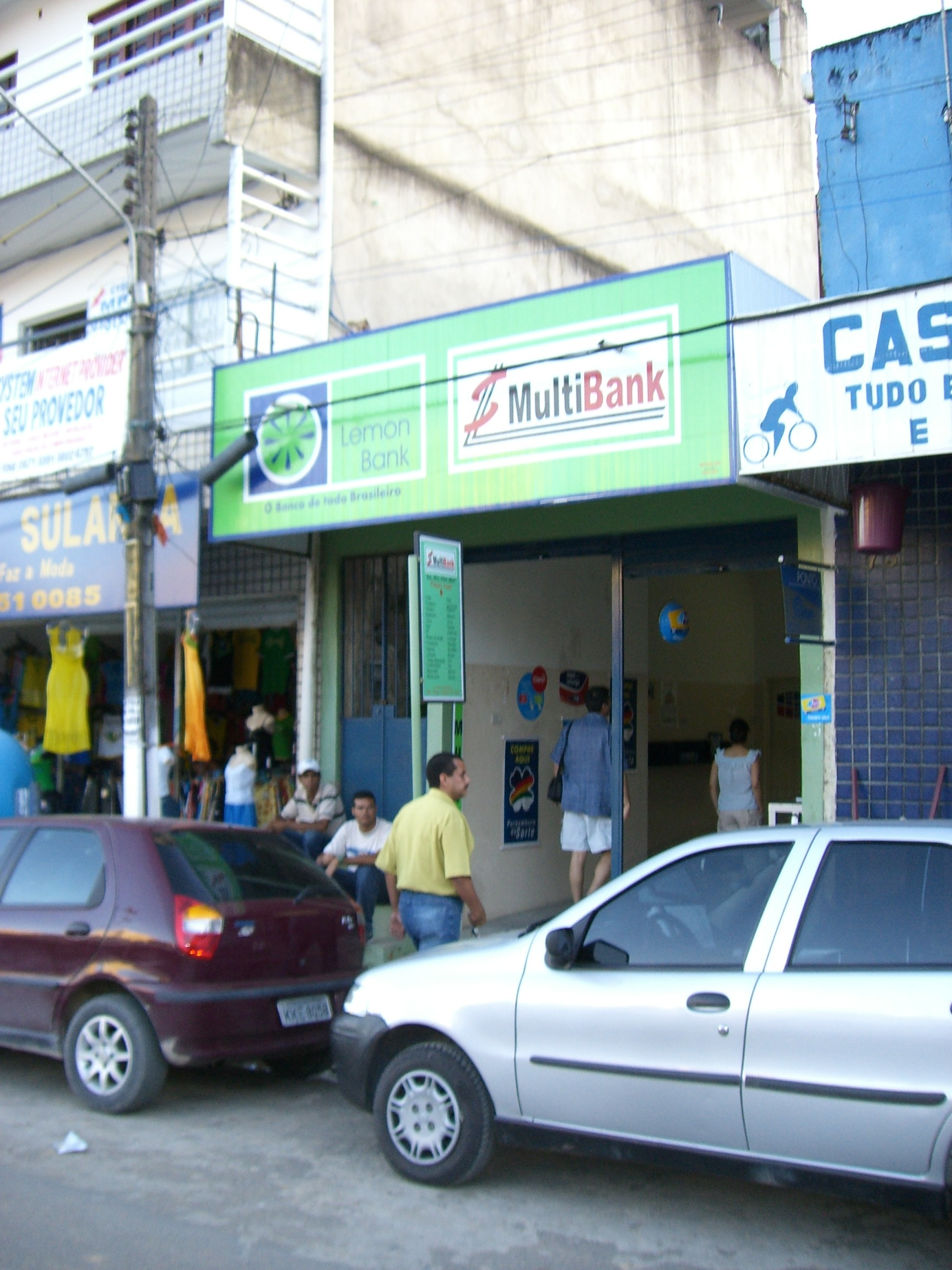
Store set up: Lemon Bank agent with own store

A banking agent may set up a dedicated store which is similar to a mini-branch, i.e., a small shop with around 1-3 tellers, but transactions are processed by non-bank staff. in most cases, the store will be branded by the bank to actually win the trust of the rural dwellers.

== Experience with banking agents ==
Pioneering banks, microfinance institutions, and mobile operators started to experiment with banking agent networks in various countries around the world such as Brazil, Peru, Colombia, Kenya, Mexico, Pakistan, the Philippines, and South Africa.

Brazil is probably the most developed market where banking agents have significantly increased financial system infrastructure. Seventy-four institutions are currently managing around 105,000 points of sale in Brazil that reach all 5,561 municipalities. Within only 5 years, the banking agent network facilitated 12.4m new bank accounts and today the network comprises 56 percent of all points of sale in the Brazilian financial system. Financial institutions in other Latin-American markets such as Peru, Colombia, and Mexico have started to learn from the Brazilian experience, adjusted their regulation, and established their own banking agent networks. Pioneers in other regions can be found in Kenya, Mongolia, South Africa, and the Philippines.
