= Security First Network Bank =

US Internet-only bank

- Industry: Banking
- Founded: October 1995; 30 years ago in Pineville, Kentucky
- Defunct: September 30, 1998
- Fate: Banking operations acquired by Royal Bank of Canada; Software development company spun off as S1 Corporation

Security First Network Bank (SFNB) was the first pure Internet bank in the United States. It had no physical branch bank offices and could only be accessed online. It was founded in Pineville, Kentucky, in October 1995 by Michael McChesney and James (Chip) S. Mahan III. Several months later, the bank relocated to Atlanta, Georgia.

It was initially established as a savings bank along with a wholly owned software company (Security First Technologies). Eventually teller services were added in Atlanta. On September 30, 1998, Royal Bank of Canada (RBC) acquired the banking portion of the Security First Network Bank, while the software development company was spun off as S1 Corporation. RBC subsequently acquired Centura Bank of North Carolina, rebranded the online banking segment as RBC Centura, and made several adjustments to customer terms of service at that time.

Before Security First, some banks had experimented with a variety of schemes for providing online banking. Usually this involved some kind of token that was placed in an account that could only be used on the Internet. The tokens were not protected by the Federal Deposit Insurance Corporation.

Security First allowed direct access to accounts, bill payment and the viewing of check images, all of which are commonplace today.
