= Grande Boulevard Mall (Florida) =

Former shopping mall in Jacksonville, Florida

- Location: Jacksonville, Florida, United States
- Coordinates: 30°13′20.10″N 81°33′12.91″W
- Address: 9911 Old Baymeadows Road
- Opened: November 17, 1983
- Closed: 1994
- Developer: National Capital Investments
- Num. of stores: 65
- Num. of anchor tenants: 1
- Floor area: 289,000 sq ft (26,800 m^{2})
- Floors: 2

Grande Boulevard Mall was an enclosed shopping mall in Jacksonville, Florida, United States. It opened on November 17, 1983, near Baymeadows Road and Southside Boulevard, and was anchored by Jacobson's.

The property was sold in 1994 to Florida Community College at Jacksonville, later Florida State College at Jacksonville, and converted into the Deerwood Center campus. Jacobson’s remained open until 2002.

== History ==
Grande Boulevard Mall was announced in 1982 by National Capital Investments. The project was planned as a two-story, 289,000 sq ft (26,800 m^{2}) mall with 65 retailers and an 80,000 sq ft (7,400 m^{2}) Jacobson's department store.

Saks Fifth Avenue, Neiman Marcus and Nordstrom were among the department stores expected to join the mall, but none ultimately opened there.

The mall opened with 65 retailers. By 1986, 24 stores remained open. By 1988, more than half of the mall’s leasable retail space was vacant.

According to The Jaxson, Grande Boulevard Mall was developed to target Jacksonville’s growing upscale suburban retail market, but its high-end positioning was later described as too ritzy for the local market.

In the early 1990s, Grande Boulevard Mall increasingly relied on entertainment and dining businesses, including Punch Line, T-Birds and Legal Tender. Within two years, 38 percent of its 60 available spaces were occupied.

The Avenues opened in Jacksonville in 1990. In 1994, Grande Boulevard Mall was sold to Florida Community College at Jacksonville for $4 million, excluding the Jacobson's store. The former mall space was converted into classrooms and open space. By 1995, it had become FCCJ Open Campus Deerwood Center.

Jacobson’s continued operating until 2002, when the chain filed for bankruptcy. The former mall is now part of Florida State College at Jacksonville's Deerwood Center.
