= Baymeadows (Jacksonville) =

Neighborhood of Jacksonville, Florida

- Neighborhood
- Baymeadows is shaded
- Country: United States
- State: Florida
- City: Jacksonville
- ZIP Code: 32256
- Area code(s): 904, 324

Baymeadows is a suburban neighborhood and economic hub of Jacksonville, Florida on the city's Southside, 10 miles from Downtown. The area offers an urban-suburban feel with a mixture of business parks, retail and residential. It has highway retail, planned developments, manufacturing, distribution, wetland ponds and lakes.

== Geography ==
The Baymeadows neighborhood begins at the interchange of Butler Boulevard and Southside, following Butler east to the CSX railroad west of Philips Highway, then turns south along the tracks to Sunbeam Road. The boundary goes WNW to Interstate 95, the follows the interstate south to the Southside Boulevard interchange, south down Southside to Deercreek Club Road; east to Interstate 295; turning north to the Baymeadows Road Interchange; along Baymeadows to Southside Boulevard; north to the starting point, forming an hourglass shape.

== History ==
The roots of Baymeadows began with the exclusive 900 acres (360 ha) Deerwood development and the 1960 Deerwood Country Club by Bryant Skinner Company. It was the first gated community in Florida and for decades was known as the Southside's upscale residential location. At the time, Interstate 95 in Florida was planned, but when Deerwood was created, it was isolated, accessible only from U.S. Highway 1 on a rural road named, San Clerc. The financers were Stockton, Whatley, Davin & Co. (SWD) was the largest insurance, mortgage banking and real estate firms in Northeast Florida. The developers donated land to enable Southside Boulevard to be constructed. Southside Blvd connected to Philips Highway about the same time the Avenues Mall opened in 1990. As usage increased, San Clerc was paved, then widened and was renamed Baymeadows Road which received an Interstate 95 interchange around the mid-1960s when the Interstate highway was built. Baymeadows Fire Station #44 was built in 1976. The Baymeadows Direct Delivery Center was established in 1990 by the United States Postal Service.

== Golf ==
Brother developers Paul & Jerome Fletcher took notice of Deerwood and acquired 500 acres (200 ha) a mile away from the future I-95 and Baymeadows Road interchange. Englishman Desmond Muirhead was engaged to design a golf course around a master-planned community with Gene Sarazen "consulting". Golfer and journalist Fred Seely wrote, "They got a magnificent layout through swampy land - it couldn't be built in today’s environmental-friendly society". The Baymeadows Golf Course opened in May 1968 as a private club where qualifiers for the U.S. Open were held. It was a premiere course in Jacksonville with 750 members to start because there were not enough courses to meet demand. Society began to change: in the 1940s and 1950s, people were excluded because of their heritage or color. Developers began including golf courses and club memberships with their homes. A private Baymeadows club could not survive financially, so it became semi-private and sold more and more condos. Eventually, it lost its appeal and became a tight course with condos and apartments everywhere. The 2000s United States housing bubble caused land values to soar, making the property more valuable as a development than a golf course. In 2005, D.R. Horton bought and closed the golf course with the goal of building 1,400 homes. Due to the scale and potential problems, the Baymeadows Community Council (BCC) was formed to provide a voice to existing residents in surrounding neighborhoods. That project garnered so much opposition it was vetoed. The 2008 financial crisis put the brakes on most development, so the project wasn't restarted until 2018. More than a dozen years after the original plan was shelved, developers resurrected Baymeadow Park to create an "urban village" by spending $15 million on a mixed-use development of 6-acres that will include a hotel with 100-rooms, commercial and retail space totaling 35,000 square feet (3,300 m^{2}), approximately 8,000 square feet (740 m^{2}) of office space on the second-floors, 552 townhomes and 147 homes.

== Shopping ==
When it became apparent that Deerwood would be successful, SWD began planning for the commercial amenities that would be required for the community. Jacksonville's KBJ Architects (KBJ) was engaged for the shopping center's design. The anchor tenants selected for the center were Publix and Eckerd Drugs. The buildings were designed to be similar in appearance to the lodge of the Deerwood developer, located across Southside Boulevard. Deerwood Village Mall (DVM) was one of Jacksonville's earliest suburban shopping centers, and it is still a popular retail location after 60+ years. The DVM opened in 1972 as a single level, open-air shopping center, rather than the newest trend, the enclosed mall, which premiered during 1958 at Edina, Minnesota. By 1974, Publix and Eckerd Drugs opened their doors as the mall’s two anchors.

Across the street, Grande Boulevard Mall opened in 1983 as a two-story enclosed mall anchored by Jacobson's. The center struggled with high vacancy by the late 1980s and was sold in 1994 to Florida Community College at Jacksonville, becoming the Deerwood Center campus.

The reality for the GBM set in when customers stayed away in droves; apparently the mall was too ritzy for northeast Florida. Over 50% of the mall was empty in 1988, and when the nearby Avenues Mall premiered in 1990, the GBM closed shortly after. The buildings were purchased by Florida Community College at Jacksonville in 1994 for $4 million, becoming the Deerwood Center.

Deerwood Village Mall has continued to prosper. The original Deerwood Village Publix, constructed 50 years earlier, closed in October 2024. The building was demolished, which included a CVS pharmacy, and replaced with a new 48,640 square feet (4,519 m^{2}) Publix Grocery, Publix Pharmacy and a Publix Liquors, separated as required by Florida law.

== Mass casualty event ==
On June 18, 1990, the office at 7870 Baymeadows Way was the auto loan customer center for General Motors Acceptance Corporation in Jacksonville. About 70 employees were working when 42-year-old James Edward Pough rushed into the office. The day laborer had a violent past, his marriage was failing, his 1988 Pontiac had been repossessed, and he received a bill with a balance due of $6,394. He brought a .30 caliber M1 carbine and a .38 S&W revolver with him, shooting three customers at the entrance, then walked through the office executing employees. Fourteen people were victims with nine dead. The shooter then killed himself. It was the worst mass shooting in Florida prior to the 2016 Pulse nightclub shooting in Orlando. GMAC's operation relocated, the building was gutted, rebuilt and renumbered 7840.

== Employers ==
Major employers in Baymeadows Southside include or have included: Florida Blue, Southeastern Grocers, Citigroup, Ring Power, Bombardier Capital, State Farm Insurance, JPMorgan Chase, Johnson & Johnson Vision, Gate Petroleum, Deutsche Bank, Catholic Diocese of St. Augustine, Southeast Toyota Distributors, Wounded Warrior Project, Pilot Pen, TOTE Maritime and Landstar System.

== Neighborhood ==
It is one of Jacksonville's major economic centers and commercial hubs, with business parks, abundant retail and dining and residential areas. There is apartment living with townhouses and condos as well as single family homes. Public transportation is available throughout the neighborhood. Although there are no recreational parks in Baymeadows itself, the Fort Family Regional Park, previously named 9A/Baymedows Regional Park, is situated across I-295 just east of Baymeadows at 8000 Baymeadows Road East. The city purchased the 52 acres in 2002 and the master plan was completed one year later. Turf baseball and soccer fields were added in 2023, including a concession stand and a new playground area. A Fishing Pier was constructed in 2025. Deerwood Rotary Children's Park is located just north of Fort Family. Duval Charter School Baymeadows is the only school in the neighborhood, but the Deerwood Center of Florida State College at Jacksonville is located there. There are no hospitals in the neighborhood, but several medical clinics and urgent care centers are.

== See also ==
- Neighborhoods of Jacksonville
- Southside, Jacksonville
