= Wilson Center for the Arts =

Wilson Center for the Arts may refer to the following places in the United States:

- Nathan H. Wilson Center for the Arts at Florida State College at Jacksonville, Florida
- Sharon Lynne Wilson Center for the Arts in Brookfield, Wisconsin
