= Florida State College =

Florida State College may refer to:

- Florida State College at Jacksonville, a state college in Jacksonville, Florida, U.S.
- Florida State University, previously known as Florida State College and Florida State College for Women
