= List of minor planets: 298001–299000 =

The following is a partial list of minor planets, running from minor-planet number 298001 through 299000, inclusive. The primary data for this and other partial lists is based on JPL's "Small-Body Orbital Elements" and data available from the Minor Planet Center. Critical list information is also provided by the MPC, unless otherwise specified from Lowell Observatory. A detailed description of the table's columns and additional sources are given on the main page including a complete list of every page in this series, and a statistical break-up on the dynamical classification of minor planets.

Also see the summary list of all named bodies in numerical and alphabetical order, and the corresponding naming citations for the number range of this particular list. New namings may only be added to this list after official publication, as the preannouncement of names is condemned by the Working Group for Small Bodies Nomenclature of the International Astronomical Union.

Near-Earth obj.	MBA (inner)	MBA (outer)	Centaur
Mars-crosser	MBA (middle)	Jupiter trojan	Trans-Neptunian obj.
Unclassified

== 298001–298100 ==
Designation			Discovery			Properties		Ref
Permanent	Provisional	Named after	Date	Site	Discoverer(s)	Category	Diam.	Ref
298001	2002 NQ_{75}	—	March 4, 2005	Socorro	LINEAR	·	2.4 km	MPC · JPL
298002	2002 OT_{4}	—	July 16, 2002	Haleakala	NEAT	·	2.5 km	MPC · JPL
298003	2002 ON_{14}	—	July 18, 2002	Socorro	LINEAR	EUN	1.6 km	MPC · JPL
298004	2002 OC_{15}	—	July 18, 2002	Socorro	LINEAR	·	3.0 km	MPC · JPL
298005	2002 OU_{27}	—	July 19, 2002	Palomar	NEAT	·	1.9 km	MPC · JPL
298006	2002 OA_{30}	—	July 30, 2002	Haleakala	NEAT	·	2.1 km	MPC · JPL
298007	2002 OA_{31}	—	July 29, 2002	Palomar	NEAT	·	2.5 km	MPC · JPL
298008	2002 OH_{32}	—	July 20, 2002	Palomar	NEAT	·	2.5 km	MPC · JPL
298009	2002 OR_{35}	—	November 17, 2007	Catalina	CSS	·	1.6 km	MPC · JPL
298010	2002 PG_{2}	—	August 3, 2002	Palomar	NEAT	·	2.1 km	MPC · JPL
298011	2002 PT_{2}	—	August 3, 2002	Palomar	NEAT	·	2.5 km	MPC · JPL
298012	2002 PY_{7}	—	August 3, 2002	Palomar	NEAT	·	1.6 km	MPC · JPL
298013	2002 PJ_{10}	—	August 5, 2002	Palomar	NEAT	·	2.3 km	MPC · JPL
298014	2002 PL_{10}	—	August 5, 2002	Palomar	NEAT	·	1.6 km	MPC · JPL
298015	2002 PN_{24}	—	August 6, 2002	Palomar	NEAT	·	2.1 km	MPC · JPL
298016	2002 PO_{25}	—	August 6, 2002	Palomar	NEAT	·	1.5 km	MPC · JPL
298017	2002 PB_{29}	—	August 6, 2002	Palomar	NEAT	·	1.9 km	MPC · JPL
298018	2002 PA_{31}	—	August 6, 2002	Palomar	NEAT	·	2.3 km	MPC · JPL
298019	2002 PY_{35}	—	August 6, 2002	Palomar	NEAT	·	2.7 km	MPC · JPL
298020	2002 PH_{53}	—	August 8, 2002	Palomar	NEAT	·	1.7 km	MPC · JPL
298021	2002 PW_{53}	—	August 8, 2002	Palomar	NEAT	·	2.4 km	MPC · JPL
298022	2002 PF_{78}	—	August 11, 2002	Palomar	NEAT	·	2.6 km	MPC · JPL
298023	2002 PH_{86}	—	August 13, 2002	Socorro	LINEAR	EUN	1.7 km	MPC · JPL
298024	2002 PF_{90}	—	August 11, 2002	Socorro	LINEAR	·	4.2 km	MPC · JPL
298025	2002 PR_{92}	—	August 14, 2002	Palomar	NEAT	·	2.8 km	MPC · JPL
298026	2002 PH_{102}	—	August 12, 2002	Socorro	LINEAR	·	2.3 km	MPC · JPL
298027	2002 PK_{105}	—	August 12, 2002	Socorro	LINEAR	·	2.8 km	MPC · JPL
298028	2002 PG_{119}	—	August 13, 2002	Anderson Mesa	LONEOS	·	1.7 km	MPC · JPL
298029	2002 PX_{119}	—	August 12, 2002	Socorro	LINEAR	·	2.4 km	MPC · JPL
298030	2002 PM_{141}	—	August 15, 2002	Socorro	LINEAR	·	3.4 km	MPC · JPL
298031	2002 PP_{141}	—	August 15, 2002	Socorro	LINEAR	·	3.8 km	MPC · JPL
298032	2002 PG_{142}	—	August 12, 2002	Anderson Mesa	LONEOS	·	2.4 km	MPC · JPL
298033	2002 PC_{152}	—	August 10, 2002	Cerro Tololo	M. W. Buie	·	2.3 km	MPC · JPL
298034	2002 PR_{156}	—	August 8, 2002	Palomar	S. F. Hönig	·	1.6 km	MPC · JPL
298035	2002 PN_{161}	—	August 8, 2002	Palomar	S. F. Hönig	·	1.4 km	MPC · JPL
298036	2002 PO_{162}	—	August 8, 2002	Palomar	S. F. Hönig	·	1.6 km	MPC · JPL
298037	2002 PW_{163}	—	August 8, 2002	Palomar	S. F. Hönig	MAR	1.4 km	MPC · JPL
298038	2002 PQ_{164}	—	August 8, 2002	Palomar	S. F. Hönig	·	1.5 km	MPC · JPL
298039	2002 PP_{168}	—	August 27, 2002	Palomar	NEAT	·	2.3 km	MPC · JPL
298040	2002 PO_{182}	—	August 11, 2002	Palomar	NEAT	·	2.7 km	MPC · JPL
298041	2002 PD_{191}	—	August 14, 2002	Palomar	NEAT	·	1.9 km	MPC · JPL
298042	2002 PR_{191}	—	August 15, 2002	Palomar	NEAT	·	2.6 km	MPC · JPL
298043	2002 PV_{193}	—	December 5, 2007	Catalina	CSS	·	2.0 km	MPC · JPL
298044	2002 PS_{197}	—	October 7, 2007	Mount Lemmon	Mount Lemmon Survey	·	1.4 km	MPC · JPL
298045	2002 QU_{3}	—	August 16, 2002	Palomar	NEAT	·	1.8 km	MPC · JPL
298046	2002 QF_{7}	—	August 16, 2002	Palomar	NEAT	·	1.8 km	MPC · JPL
298047	2002 QB_{8}	—	August 19, 2002	Palomar	NEAT	·	2.5 km	MPC · JPL
298048	2002 QL_{16}	—	August 26, 2002	Palomar	NEAT	EUN	1.4 km	MPC · JPL
298049	2002 QF_{35}	—	August 29, 2002	Palomar	NEAT	·	1.8 km	MPC · JPL
298050	2002 QP_{36}	—	August 28, 2002	Palomar	NEAT	MIS	3.0 km	MPC · JPL
298051	2002 QD_{37}	—	August 30, 2002	Kitt Peak	Spacewatch	·	2.0 km	MPC · JPL
298052	2002 QT_{39}	—	August 30, 2002	Palomar	NEAT	·	2.0 km	MPC · JPL
298053	2002 QW_{48}	—	August 20, 2002	Palomar	R. Matson	·	1.7 km	MPC · JPL
298054	2002 QH_{50}	—	August 30, 2002	Palomar	R. Matson	·	2.1 km	MPC · JPL
298055	2002 QM_{51}	—	August 29, 2002	Palomar	S. F. Hönig	·	3.6 km	MPC · JPL
298056	2002 QC_{54}	—	August 29, 2002	Palomar	S. F. Hönig	HNS	1.5 km	MPC · JPL
298057	2002 QN_{61}	—	August 17, 2002	Palomar	NEAT	·	1.6 km	MPC · JPL
298058	2002 QB_{81}	—	August 19, 2002	Palomar	NEAT	·	2.0 km	MPC · JPL
298059	2002 QO_{83}	—	August 17, 2002	Palomar	NEAT	·	1.6 km	MPC · JPL
298060	2002 QM_{84}	—	August 16, 2002	Palomar	NEAT	·	2.0 km	MPC · JPL
298061	2002 QN_{84}	—	August 16, 2002	Palomar	NEAT	·	2.2 km	MPC · JPL
298062	2002 QX_{85}	—	August 17, 2002	Palomar	NEAT	·	2.3 km	MPC · JPL
298063	2002 QW_{86}	—	August 17, 2002	Palomar	NEAT	WIT	960 m	MPC · JPL
298064	2002 QQ_{87}	—	August 27, 2002	Palomar	NEAT	·	2.2 km	MPC · JPL
298065	2002 QP_{96}	—	August 18, 2002	Palomar	NEAT	·	2.4 km	MPC · JPL
298066	2002 QR_{96}	—	August 18, 2002	Palomar	NEAT	·	2.1 km	MPC · JPL
298067	2002 QM_{98}	—	August 18, 2002	Palomar	NEAT	·	1.7 km	MPC · JPL
298068	2002 QG_{105}	—	August 27, 2002	Palomar	NEAT	·	1.6 km	MPC · JPL
298069	2002 QJ_{106}	—	August 19, 2002	Palomar	NEAT	·	2.5 km	MPC · JPL
298070	2002 QC_{107}	—	August 27, 2002	Palomar	NEAT	·	1.6 km	MPC · JPL
298071	2002 QV_{110}	—	August 18, 2002	Palomar	NEAT	·	1.7 km	MPC · JPL
298072	2002 QB_{113}	—	August 27, 2002	Palomar	NEAT	·	1.5 km	MPC · JPL
298073	2002 QZ_{114}	—	August 16, 2002	Palomar	NEAT	·	1.5 km	MPC · JPL
298074	2002 QW_{123}	—	August 27, 2002	Palomar	NEAT	MIS	2.7 km	MPC · JPL
298075	2002 QE_{129}	—	August 27, 2002	Palomar	NEAT	ADE	3.6 km	MPC · JPL
298076	2002 QK_{131}	—	August 30, 2002	Palomar	NEAT	HNS	1.7 km	MPC · JPL
298077	2002 QR_{131}	—	August 30, 2002	Palomar	NEAT	·	1.6 km	MPC · JPL
298078	2002 QU_{131}	—	August 30, 2002	Palomar	NEAT	·	1.5 km	MPC · JPL
298079	2002 QH_{133}	—	August 16, 2002	Palomar	NEAT	·	2.3 km	MPC · JPL
298080	2002 QA_{134}	—	August 30, 2002	Palomar	NEAT	·	1.7 km	MPC · JPL
298081	2002 QH_{135}	—	August 30, 2002	Palomar	NEAT	·	1.6 km	MPC · JPL
298082	2002 QL_{135}	—	August 19, 2002	Palomar	NEAT	·	2.0 km	MPC · JPL
298083	2002 QY_{139}	—	August 17, 2002	Palomar	NEAT	AGN	1.5 km	MPC · JPL
298084	2002 QC_{140}	—	August 17, 2002	Palomar	NEAT	·	1.4 km	MPC · JPL
298085	2002 QU_{142}	—	October 12, 2007	Kitt Peak	Spacewatch	·	2.0 km	MPC · JPL
298086	2002 QE_{147}	—	April 2, 2005	Mount Lemmon	Mount Lemmon Survey	·	1.8 km	MPC · JPL
298087	2002 RW_{2}	—	September 4, 2002	Anderson Mesa	LONEOS	·	2.4 km	MPC · JPL
298088	2002 RW_{4}	—	September 3, 2002	Palomar	NEAT	·	2.7 km	MPC · JPL
298089	2002 RF_{36}	—	September 5, 2002	Anderson Mesa	LONEOS	·	2.0 km	MPC · JPL
298090	2002 RM_{36}	—	September 5, 2002	Socorro	LINEAR	·	2.4 km	MPC · JPL
298091	2002 RY_{41}	—	September 5, 2002	Socorro	LINEAR	·	2.3 km	MPC · JPL
298092	2002 RH_{45}	—	September 5, 2002	Socorro	LINEAR	·	5.5 km	MPC · JPL
298093	2002 RQ_{46}	—	September 5, 2002	Socorro	LINEAR	·	2.3 km	MPC · JPL
298094	2002 RM_{58}	—	September 5, 2002	Anderson Mesa	LONEOS	·	2.2 km	MPC · JPL
298095	2002 RO_{60}	—	September 5, 2002	Socorro	LINEAR	·	2.5 km	MPC · JPL
298096	2002 RE_{68}	—	September 4, 2002	Anderson Mesa	LONEOS	·	2.6 km	MPC · JPL
298097	2002 RY_{76}	—	September 5, 2002	Socorro	LINEAR	·	2.6 km	MPC · JPL
298098	2002 RY_{79}	—	September 5, 2002	Socorro	LINEAR	·	2.2 km	MPC · JPL
298099	2002 RK_{99}	—	September 5, 2002	Socorro	LINEAR	·	2.7 km	MPC · JPL
298100	2002 RS_{108}	—	September 5, 2002	Haleakala	NEAT	·	2.4 km	MPC · JPL

== 298101–298200 ==
back to top

Designation			Discovery			Properties		Ref
Permanent	Provisional	Named after	Date	Site	Discoverer(s)	Category	Diam.	Ref
298101	2002 RC_{119}	—	September 5, 2002	Haleakala	NEAT	·	2.9 km	MPC · JPL
298102	2002 RO_{121}	—	September 7, 2002	Socorro	LINEAR	·	3.1 km	MPC · JPL
298103	2002 RP_{126}	—	September 9, 2002	Palomar	NEAT	EUN	1.7 km	MPC · JPL
298104	2002 RQ_{127}	—	September 10, 2002	Palomar	NEAT	·	2.4 km	MPC · JPL
298105	2002 RS_{127}	—	September 10, 2002	Palomar	NEAT	·	3.0 km	MPC · JPL
298106	2002 RR_{133}	—	September 10, 2002	Palomar	NEAT	·	2.5 km	MPC · JPL
298107	2002 RR_{139}	—	September 10, 2002	Palomar	NEAT	·	2.6 km	MPC · JPL
298108	2002 RV_{140}	—	September 10, 2002	Palomar	NEAT	·	2.8 km	MPC · JPL
298109	2002 RZ_{144}	—	September 11, 2002	Palomar	NEAT	·	2.1 km	MPC · JPL
298110	2002 RG_{146}	—	September 11, 2002	Palomar	NEAT	·	1.6 km	MPC · JPL
298111	2002 RJ_{152}	—	September 12, 2002	Palomar	NEAT	·	2.9 km	MPC · JPL
298112	2002 RC_{154}	—	September 13, 2002	Kitt Peak	Spacewatch	·	1.6 km	MPC · JPL
298113	2002 RN_{176}	—	September 13, 2002	Palomar	NEAT	·	2.1 km	MPC · JPL
298114	2002 RF_{177}	—	September 13, 2002	Palomar	NEAT	·	1.8 km	MPC · JPL
298115	2002 RR_{177}	—	September 13, 2002	Palomar	NEAT	·	2.0 km	MPC · JPL
298116	2002 RC_{199}	—	September 13, 2002	Palomar	NEAT	MIS	2.2 km	MPC · JPL
298117	2002 RB_{202}	—	September 13, 2002	Haleakala	NEAT	·	2.9 km	MPC · JPL
298118	2002 RF_{202}	—	September 13, 2002	Palomar	NEAT	·	2.1 km	MPC · JPL
298119	2002 RS_{206}	—	September 14, 2002	Palomar	NEAT	·	1.9 km	MPC · JPL
298120	2002 RV_{212}	—	September 15, 2002	Haleakala	NEAT	·	2.3 km	MPC · JPL
298121	2002 RP_{228}	—	September 14, 2002	Haleakala	NEAT	·	2.6 km	MPC · JPL
298122	2002 RP_{237}	—	September 15, 2002	Palomar	R. Matson	·	2.3 km	MPC · JPL
298123	2002 RW_{237}	—	September 15, 2002	Palomar	R. Matson	·	1.5 km	MPC · JPL
298124	2002 RE_{243}	—	September 14, 2002	Palomar	NEAT	·	1.9 km	MPC · JPL
298125	2002 RH_{247}	—	September 14, 2002	Palomar	NEAT	·	1.5 km	MPC · JPL
298126	2002 RB_{251}	—	September 15, 2002	Palomar	NEAT	fast	2.3 km	MPC · JPL
298127	2002 RF_{251}	—	September 4, 2002	Palomar	NEAT	·	2.7 km	MPC · JPL
298128	2002 RZ_{251}	—	September 12, 2002	Palomar	NEAT	·	1.8 km	MPC · JPL
298129	2002 RR_{253}	—	September 11, 2002	Palomar	NEAT	·	1.6 km	MPC · JPL
298130	2002 RD_{255}	—	September 15, 2002	Palomar	NEAT	·	2.2 km	MPC · JPL
298131	2002 RZ_{262}	—	September 13, 2002	Palomar	NEAT	·	2.6 km	MPC · JPL
298132	2002 RZ_{263}	—	September 15, 2002	Anderson Mesa	LONEOS	·	2.1 km	MPC · JPL
298133	2002 RR_{265}	—	September 5, 2002	Haleakala	NEAT	·	2.3 km	MPC · JPL
298134	2002 RD_{272}	—	September 4, 2002	Palomar	NEAT	·	2.2 km	MPC · JPL
298135	2002 RV_{272}	—	September 4, 2002	Palomar	NEAT	·	1.7 km	MPC · JPL
298136	2002 RD_{273}	—	September 14, 2002	Palomar	NEAT	(12739)	1.6 km	MPC · JPL
298137	2002 RZ_{277}	—	September 4, 2002	Palomar	NEAT	·	1.6 km	MPC · JPL
298138	2002 RH_{280}	—	September 14, 2002	Palomar	NEAT	·	2.1 km	MPC · JPL
298139	2002 RN_{290}	—	May 8, 2010	Mount Lemmon	Mount Lemmon Survey	·	1.8 km	MPC · JPL
298140	2002 SL_{1}	—	September 26, 2002	Palomar	NEAT	·	2.9 km	MPC · JPL
298141	2002 ST_{4}	—	September 27, 2002	Palomar	NEAT	·	2.0 km	MPC · JPL
298142	2002 SX_{20}	—	September 26, 2002	Palomar	NEAT	·	3.1 km	MPC · JPL
298143	2002 SN_{25}	—	September 28, 2002	Haleakala	NEAT	(21344)	2.5 km	MPC · JPL
298144	2002 SQ_{38}	—	September 30, 2002	Socorro	LINEAR	·	1.7 km	MPC · JPL
298145	2002 SH_{45}	—	September 29, 2002	Haleakala	NEAT	ADE	2.9 km	MPC · JPL
298146	2002 SX_{49}	—	September 30, 2002	Haleakala	NEAT	·	2.4 km	MPC · JPL
298147	2002 SD_{54}	—	September 30, 2002	Socorro	LINEAR	·	3.6 km	MPC · JPL
298148	2002 SO_{62}	—	September 26, 2002	Palomar	NEAT	(11882)	1.9 km	MPC · JPL
298149	2002 SE_{66}	—	September 16, 2002	Palomar	NEAT	·	2.1 km	MPC · JPL
298150	2002 SC_{69}	—	September 26, 2002	Palomar	NEAT	·	1.6 km	MPC · JPL
298151	2002 SJ_{72}	—	September 16, 2002	Palomar	NEAT	·	1.7 km	MPC · JPL
298152	2002 SG_{74}	—	September 26, 2002	Palomar	NEAT	·	2.2 km	MPC · JPL
298153	2002 TQ_{2}	—	October 1, 2002	Anderson Mesa	LONEOS	·	2.5 km	MPC · JPL
298154	2002 TG_{18}	—	October 2, 2002	Socorro	LINEAR	·	1.6 km	MPC · JPL
298155	2002 TV_{22}	—	October 2, 2002	Socorro	LINEAR	·	2.6 km	MPC · JPL
298156	2002 TW_{24}	—	October 2, 2002	Socorro	LINEAR	·	2.0 km	MPC · JPL
298157	2002 TA_{26}	—	October 2, 2002	Socorro	LINEAR	·	2.1 km	MPC · JPL
298158	2002 TU_{50}	—	October 2, 2002	Socorro	LINEAR	·	4.4 km	MPC · JPL
298159	2002 TZ_{55}	—	October 1, 2002	Anderson Mesa	LONEOS	·	2.2 km	MPC · JPL
298160	2002 TR_{56}	—	October 2, 2002	Socorro	LINEAR	·	2.5 km	MPC · JPL
298161	2002 TP_{62}	—	October 3, 2002	Campo Imperatore	CINEOS	·	2.0 km	MPC · JPL
298162	2002 TO_{67}	—	October 6, 2002	Uccle	T. Pauwels	DOR	1.9 km	MPC · JPL
298163	2002 TN_{101}	—	October 4, 2002	Socorro	LINEAR	·	2.6 km	MPC · JPL
298164	2002 TA_{102}	—	October 4, 2002	Socorro	LINEAR	·	2.0 km	MPC · JPL
298165	2002 TN_{103}	—	October 4, 2002	Socorro	LINEAR	PAD	2.0 km	MPC · JPL
298166	2002 TF_{110}	—	October 2, 2002	Haleakala	NEAT	·	2.5 km	MPC · JPL
298167	2002 TK_{119}	—	October 3, 2002	Palomar	NEAT	·	2.4 km	MPC · JPL
298168	2002 TU_{123}	—	October 4, 2002	Palomar	NEAT	·	3.0 km	MPC · JPL
298169	2002 TU_{141}	—	October 5, 2002	Socorro	LINEAR	·	4.1 km	MPC · JPL
298170	2002 TS_{145}	—	October 3, 2002	Campo Imperatore	CINEOS	EUN	1.7 km	MPC · JPL
298171	2002 TO_{154}	—	October 5, 2002	Palomar	NEAT	·	2.9 km	MPC · JPL
298172	2002 TV_{154}	—	October 5, 2002	Palomar	NEAT	·	2.8 km	MPC · JPL
298173	2002 TM_{161}	—	October 5, 2002	Palomar	NEAT	·	3.2 km	MPC · JPL
298174	2002 TM_{163}	—	October 5, 2002	Palomar	NEAT	·	2.7 km	MPC · JPL
298175	2002 TQ_{165}	—	October 3, 2002	Palomar	NEAT	·	1.8 km	MPC · JPL
298176	2002 TE_{166}	—	October 3, 2002	Palomar	NEAT	·	2.9 km	MPC · JPL
298177	2002 TM_{166}	—	October 3, 2002	Palomar	NEAT	·	2.6 km	MPC · JPL
298178	2002 TV_{166}	—	October 3, 2002	Palomar	NEAT	·	2.9 km	MPC · JPL
298179	2002 TO_{167}	—	October 3, 2002	Palomar	NEAT	EUN	1.9 km	MPC · JPL
298180	2002 TR_{169}	—	October 3, 2002	Socorro	LINEAR	GEF	1.6 km	MPC · JPL
298181	2002 TW_{172}	—	October 4, 2002	Socorro	LINEAR	·	3.0 km	MPC · JPL
298182	2002 TH_{175}	—	October 4, 2002	Socorro	LINEAR	JUN	1.4 km	MPC · JPL
298183	2002 TY_{189}	—	October 5, 2002	Socorro	LINEAR	·	2.3 km	MPC · JPL
298184	2002 TS_{193}	—	October 3, 2002	Socorro	LINEAR	·	2.7 km	MPC · JPL
298185	2002 TW_{196}	—	October 4, 2002	Palomar	NEAT	MRX	1.4 km	MPC · JPL
298186	2002 TD_{197}	—	October 4, 2002	Socorro	LINEAR	·	2.4 km	MPC · JPL
298187	2002 TP_{197}	—	October 4, 2002	Socorro	LINEAR	·	2.6 km	MPC · JPL
298188	2002 TO_{199}	—	October 3, 2002	Palomar	NEAT	·	3.4 km	MPC · JPL
298189	2002 TL_{203}	—	October 4, 2002	Socorro	LINEAR	·	2.9 km	MPC · JPL
298190	2002 TQ_{205}	—	October 4, 2002	Socorro	LINEAR	·	3.0 km	MPC · JPL
298191	2002 TL_{230}	—	October 6, 2002	Haleakala	NEAT	·	2.9 km	MPC · JPL
298192	2002 TV_{235}	—	October 6, 2002	Socorro	LINEAR	·	2.3 km	MPC · JPL
298193	2002 TL_{239}	—	October 9, 2002	Socorro	LINEAR	MRX	1.3 km	MPC · JPL
298194	2002 TO_{244}	—	October 10, 2002	Palomar	NEAT	·	2.0 km	MPC · JPL
298195	2002 TU_{256}	—	October 9, 2002	Socorro	LINEAR	·	4.1 km	MPC · JPL
298196	2002 TA_{262}	—	October 10, 2002	Palomar	NEAT	526	2.8 km	MPC · JPL
298197	2002 TG_{274}	—	October 9, 2002	Socorro	LINEAR	·	2.8 km	MPC · JPL
298198	2002 TH_{279}	—	October 10, 2002	Socorro	LINEAR	·	3.1 km	MPC · JPL
298199	2002 TT_{279}	—	October 10, 2002	Socorro	LINEAR	·	2.7 km	MPC · JPL
298200	2002 TP_{280}	—	October 10, 2002	Socorro	LINEAR	·	3.2 km	MPC · JPL

== 298201–298300 ==
back to top

Designation			Discovery			Properties		Ref
Permanent	Provisional	Named after	Date	Site	Discoverer(s)	Category	Diam.	Ref
298201	2002 TN_{282}	—	October 10, 2002	Socorro	LINEAR	·	4.9 km	MPC · JPL
298202	2002 TZ_{292}	—	October 10, 2002	Socorro	LINEAR	·	3.2 km	MPC · JPL
298203	2002 TC_{296}	—	October 13, 2002	Palomar	NEAT	·	4.8 km	MPC · JPL
298204	2002 TJ_{298}	—	October 12, 2002	Socorro	LINEAR	·	2.0 km	MPC · JPL
298205	2002 TS_{298}	—	October 12, 2002	Socorro	LINEAR	·	3.1 km	MPC · JPL
298206	2002 TR_{299}	—	October 15, 2002	Palomar	NEAT	·	2.4 km	MPC · JPL
298207	2002 TT_{311}	—	October 4, 2002	Apache Point	SDSS	EUN	1.8 km	MPC · JPL
298208	2002 TS_{318}	—	October 5, 2002	Apache Point	SDSS	·	1.9 km	MPC · JPL
298209	2002 TD_{330}	—	October 5, 2002	Apache Point	SDSS	GEF	1.3 km	MPC · JPL
298210	2002 TW_{339}	—	October 5, 2002	Apache Point	SDSS	HOF	3.1 km	MPC · JPL
298211	2002 TB_{351}	—	October 10, 2002	Apache Point	SDSS	·	2.1 km	MPC · JPL
298212	2002 TD_{354}	—	October 10, 2002	Apache Point	SDSS	·	1.8 km	MPC · JPL
298213	2002 TE_{355}	—	October 10, 2002	Apache Point	SDSS	MRX	960 m	MPC · JPL
298214	2002 TN_{355}	—	October 10, 2002	Apache Point	SDSS	·	2.0 km	MPC · JPL
298215	2002 TS_{374}	—	October 5, 2002	Socorro	LINEAR	·	2.7 km	MPC · JPL
298216	2002 TT_{375}	—	October 3, 2002	Socorro	LINEAR	DOR	4.3 km	MPC · JPL
298217	2002 TF_{382}	—	October 1, 2002	Anderson Mesa	LONEOS	·	2.7 km	MPC · JPL
298218	2002 TT_{382}	—	October 15, 2002	Palomar	NEAT	·	2.3 km	MPC · JPL
298219	2002 TF_{385}	—	October 10, 2002	Apache Point	SDSS	HOF	3.4 km	MPC · JPL
298220	2002 UF_{6}	—	October 28, 2002	Palomar	NEAT	·	3.3 km	MPC · JPL
298221	2002 UD_{7}	—	October 28, 2002	Palomar	NEAT	·	3.1 km	MPC · JPL
298222	2002 UT_{24}	—	October 29, 2002	Kitt Peak	Spacewatch	·	2.5 km	MPC · JPL
298223	2002 UB_{33}	—	October 31, 2002	Anderson Mesa	LONEOS	DOR	2.7 km	MPC · JPL
298224	2002 UC_{36}	—	October 31, 2002	Palomar	NEAT	·	2.9 km	MPC · JPL
298225	2002 UR_{43}	—	October 30, 2002	Kitt Peak	Spacewatch	·	2.4 km	MPC · JPL
298226	2002 UA_{45}	—	October 31, 2002	Socorro	LINEAR	DOR	2.5 km	MPC · JPL
298227	2002 UO_{46}	—	October 31, 2002	Needville	J. Dellinger, W. G. Dillon	GEF	1.6 km	MPC · JPL
298228	2002 UY_{46}	—	October 31, 2002	Socorro	LINEAR	DOR	2.8 km	MPC · JPL
298229	2002 UG_{63}	—	October 30, 2002	Apache Point	SDSS	PAD	1.5 km	MPC · JPL
298230	2002 UU_{63}	—	October 30, 2002	Apache Point	SDSS	·	2.3 km	MPC · JPL
298231	2002 UL_{75}	—	October 31, 2002	Palomar	NEAT	·	2.0 km	MPC · JPL
298232 Ericlimburg	2002 UA_{77}	Ericlimburg	October 31, 2002	Palomar	NEAT	·	2.1 km	MPC · JPL
298233	2002 UH_{77}	—	October 18, 2002	Palomar	NEAT	·	2.4 km	MPC · JPL
298234	2002 UE_{78}	—	October 29, 2002	Palomar	NEAT	·	2.9 km	MPC · JPL
298235	2002 VC_{4}	—	November 1, 2002	Haleakala	NEAT	·	2.4 km	MPC · JPL
298236	2002 VQ_{7}	—	November 1, 2002	Palomar	NEAT	(32418)	3.2 km	MPC · JPL
298237	2002 VM_{13}	—	November 4, 2002	Kitt Peak	Spacewatch	·	2.9 km	MPC · JPL
298238	2002 VP_{13}	—	November 4, 2002	Kitt Peak	Spacewatch	·	3.6 km	MPC · JPL
298239	2002 VB_{16}	—	November 4, 2002	Anderson Mesa	LONEOS	·	2.5 km	MPC · JPL
298240	2002 VS_{22}	—	November 5, 2002	Socorro	LINEAR	DOR	2.9 km	MPC · JPL
298241	2002 VC_{28}	—	November 5, 2002	Anderson Mesa	LONEOS	·	3.2 km	MPC · JPL
298242	2002 VP_{36}	—	November 5, 2002	Anderson Mesa	LONEOS	·	2.3 km	MPC · JPL
298243	2002 VY_{42}	—	November 4, 2002	Palomar	NEAT	·	2.7 km	MPC · JPL
298244	2002 VB_{44}	—	November 4, 2002	Palomar	NEAT	·	4.1 km	MPC · JPL
298245	2002 VC_{44}	—	November 4, 2002	Haleakala	NEAT	GEF	1.6 km	MPC · JPL
298246	2002 VW_{50}	—	November 6, 2002	Socorro	LINEAR	·	2.2 km	MPC · JPL
298247	2002 VL_{51}	—	November 6, 2002	Anderson Mesa	LONEOS	·	3.0 km	MPC · JPL
298248	2002 VE_{52}	—	November 6, 2002	Anderson Mesa	LONEOS	·	2.9 km	MPC · JPL
298249	2002 VZ_{53}	—	November 6, 2002	Socorro	LINEAR	·	2.8 km	MPC · JPL
298250	2002 VO_{54}	—	November 6, 2002	Anderson Mesa	LONEOS	·	5.1 km	MPC · JPL
298251	2002 VP_{58}	—	November 6, 2002	Haleakala	NEAT	·	3.1 km	MPC · JPL
298252	2002 VE_{61}	—	November 5, 2002	Socorro	LINEAR	PAD	2.3 km	MPC · JPL
298253	2002 VF_{61}	—	November 5, 2002	Socorro	LINEAR	·	2.8 km	MPC · JPL
298254	2002 VG_{78}	—	November 7, 2002	Socorro	LINEAR	L5	10 km	MPC · JPL
298255	2002 VS_{87}	—	November 8, 2002	Socorro	LINEAR	MRX	1.6 km	MPC · JPL
298256	2002 VP_{96}	—	November 11, 2002	Anderson Mesa	LONEOS	·	2.2 km	MPC · JPL
298257	2002 VZ_{96}	—	November 12, 2002	Anderson Mesa	LONEOS	·	3.1 km	MPC · JPL
298258	2002 VT_{102}	—	November 12, 2002	Socorro	LINEAR	·	2.9 km	MPC · JPL
298259	2002 VW_{117}	—	November 13, 2002	Socorro	LINEAR	·	3.1 km	MPC · JPL
298260	2002 VS_{123}	—	November 14, 2002	Palomar	NEAT	·	3.0 km	MPC · JPL
298261	2002 VA_{143}	—	November 15, 2002	Palomar	NEAT	·	2.5 km	MPC · JPL
298262	2002 VD_{144}	—	November 4, 2002	Palomar	NEAT	AST	2.3 km	MPC · JPL
298263	2002 WN_{15}	—	November 28, 2002	Anderson Mesa	LONEOS	DOR	2.8 km	MPC · JPL
298264	2002 WH_{16}	—	November 28, 2002	Haleakala	NEAT	·	3.2 km	MPC · JPL
298265	2002 WS_{16}	—	November 28, 2002	Haleakala	NEAT	DOR	2.8 km	MPC · JPL
298266	2002 WU_{18}	—	November 30, 2002	Socorro	LINEAR	·	2.2 km	MPC · JPL
298267	2002 WL_{20}	—	November 25, 2002	Kitt Peak	Spacewatch	·	2.6 km	MPC · JPL
298268	2002 XG	—	December 1, 2002	Emerald Lane	L. Ball	MRX	1.4 km	MPC · JPL
298269	2002 XY	—	December 1, 2002	Haleakala	NEAT	·	4.3 km	MPC · JPL
298270	2002 XW_{2}	—	December 1, 2002	Socorro	LINEAR	·	2.7 km	MPC · JPL
298271	2002 XY_{5}	—	December 1, 2002	Socorro	LINEAR	·	3.1 km	MPC · JPL
298272	2002 XY_{6}	—	December 2, 2002	Socorro	LINEAR	·	3.0 km	MPC · JPL
298273	2002 XJ_{12}	—	December 3, 2002	Palomar	NEAT	·	3.7 km	MPC · JPL
298274	2002 XY_{23}	—	December 5, 2002	Socorro	LINEAR	GEF	1.9 km	MPC · JPL
298275	2002 XF_{30}	—	December 6, 2002	Socorro	LINEAR	·	2.7 km	MPC · JPL
298276	2002 XE_{33}	—	December 6, 2002	Palomar	NEAT	DOR	3.1 km	MPC · JPL
298277	2002 XG_{46}	—	December 7, 2002	Socorro	LINEAR	·	3.3 km	MPC · JPL
298278	2002 XL_{54}	—	December 10, 2002	Palomar	NEAT	·	3.3 km	MPC · JPL
298279	2002 XV_{66}	—	December 10, 2002	Desert Eagle	W. K. Y. Yeung	DOR	3.4 km	MPC · JPL
298280	2002 XZ_{83}	—	December 13, 2002	Palomar	NEAT	·	2.6 km	MPC · JPL
298281	2002 XD_{94}	—	December 3, 2002	Palomar	S. F. Hönig	fast	2.9 km	MPC · JPL
298282	2002 XL_{98}	—	December 5, 2002	Socorro	LINEAR	·	2.5 km	MPC · JPL
298283	2002 XW_{100}	—	December 5, 2002	Socorro	LINEAR	·	2.1 km	MPC · JPL
298284	2002 YC_{13}	—	December 31, 2002	Socorro	LINEAR	·	2.9 km	MPC · JPL
298285	2002 YD_{31}	—	December 31, 2002	Socorro	LINEAR	EOS	2.8 km	MPC · JPL
298286	2003 AG_{3}	—	January 1, 2003	Kitt Peak	Spacewatch	·	3.5 km	MPC · JPL
298287	2003 AF_{22}	—	January 5, 2003	Socorro	LINEAR	·	2.9 km	MPC · JPL
298288	2003 AC_{68}	—	January 8, 2003	Socorro	LINEAR	·	2.7 km	MPC · JPL
298289	2003 AF_{70}	—	January 8, 2003	Socorro	LINEAR	·	4.1 km	MPC · JPL
298290	2003 AZ_{72}	—	January 10, 2003	Socorro	LINEAR	·	2.6 km	MPC · JPL
298291	2003 AL_{86}	—	January 1, 2003	Socorro	LINEAR	(18466)	3.3 km	MPC · JPL
298292	2003 AC_{90}	—	January 5, 2003	Kitt Peak	Spacewatch	·	2.4 km	MPC · JPL
298293	2003 BA_{10}	—	January 26, 2003	Palomar	NEAT	·	4.5 km	MPC · JPL
298294	2003 BX_{11}	—	January 26, 2003	Anderson Mesa	LONEOS	·	4.0 km	MPC · JPL
298295	2003 BW_{18}	—	January 26, 2003	Palomar	NEAT	·	5.7 km	MPC · JPL
298296	2003 BC_{27}	—	January 26, 2003	Anderson Mesa	LONEOS	·	3.5 km	MPC · JPL
298297	2003 BF_{32}	—	January 27, 2003	Socorro	LINEAR	EOS	2.7 km	MPC · JPL
298298	2003 BH_{39}	—	January 27, 2003	Socorro	LINEAR	·	3.1 km	MPC · JPL
298299	2003 BH_{62}	—	January 28, 2003	Kitt Peak	Spacewatch	·	3.7 km	MPC · JPL
298300	2003 BL_{78}	—	January 31, 2003	Anderson Mesa	LONEOS	·	2.2 km	MPC · JPL

== 298301–298400 ==
back to top

Designation			Discovery			Properties		Ref
Permanent	Provisional	Named after	Date	Site	Discoverer(s)	Category	Diam.	Ref
298301	2003 BH_{94}	—	February 27, 2009	Kitt Peak	Spacewatch	EOS	2.6 km	MPC · JPL
298302	2003 CW_{11}	—	February 1, 2003	Socorro	LINEAR	·	2.2 km	MPC · JPL
298303	2003 CY_{16}	—	February 7, 2003	Desert Eagle	W. K. Y. Yeung	·	3.0 km	MPC · JPL
298304	2003 CN_{18}	—	February 6, 2003	Kitt Peak	Spacewatch	·	890 m	MPC · JPL
298305	2003 DO	—	January 31, 2003	Socorro	LINEAR	·	990 m	MPC · JPL
298306	2003 DG_{1}	—	February 21, 2003	Palomar	NEAT	·	1.1 km	MPC · JPL
298307	2003 DZ_{7}	—	February 22, 2003	Kitt Peak	Spacewatch	·	1.7 km	MPC · JPL
298308	2003 DR_{12}	—	February 26, 2003	Campo Imperatore	CINEOS	·	3.9 km	MPC · JPL
298309	2003 DK_{18}	—	February 19, 2003	Palomar	NEAT	EOS	2.7 km	MPC · JPL
298310	2003 EV_{3}	—	March 6, 2003	Palomar	NEAT	·	960 m	MPC · JPL
298311	2003 EJ_{11}	—	March 6, 2003	Socorro	LINEAR	·	790 m	MPC · JPL
298312	2003 EE_{18}	—	March 6, 2003	Anderson Mesa	LONEOS	·	5.0 km	MPC · JPL
298313	2003 EV_{26}	—	March 6, 2003	Anderson Mesa	LONEOS	·	4.2 km	MPC · JPL
298314	2003 ED_{33}	—	March 7, 2003	Anderson Mesa	LONEOS	·	3.4 km	MPC · JPL
298315	2003 EG_{35}	—	March 7, 2003	Socorro	LINEAR	·	4.0 km	MPC · JPL
298316	2003 ET_{38}	—	March 8, 2003	Anderson Mesa	LONEOS	·	5.4 km	MPC · JPL
298317	2003 EL_{43}	—	March 7, 2003	Anderson Mesa	LONEOS	·	7.2 km	MPC · JPL
298318	2003 ES_{44}	—	March 7, 2003	Anderson Mesa	LONEOS	·	910 m	MPC · JPL
298319	2003 EC_{45}	—	March 7, 2003	Socorro	LINEAR	·	1.5 km	MPC · JPL
298320	2003 EK_{50}	—	March 10, 2003	Campo Imperatore	CINEOS	·	5.6 km	MPC · JPL
298321	2003 ED_{56}	—	March 11, 2003	Kitt Peak	Spacewatch	T_{j} (2.97) · CYB	5.6 km	MPC · JPL
298322	2003 ER_{61}	—	March 6, 2003	Anderson Mesa	LONEOS	·	3.2 km	MPC · JPL
298323	2003 FG_{30}	—	March 25, 2003	Haleakala	NEAT	·	5.0 km	MPC · JPL
298324	2003 FY_{32}	—	March 23, 2003	Kitt Peak	Spacewatch	PHO	1.3 km	MPC · JPL
298325	2003 FB_{38}	—	March 23, 2003	Kitt Peak	Spacewatch	·	3.4 km	MPC · JPL
298326	2003 FB_{41}	—	March 25, 2003	Palomar	NEAT	·	3.8 km	MPC · JPL
298327	2003 FK_{46}	—	March 24, 2003	Kitt Peak	Spacewatch	·	4.1 km	MPC · JPL
298328	2003 FY_{47}	—	March 24, 2003	Kitt Peak	Spacewatch	·	1.5 km	MPC · JPL
298329	2003 FV_{50}	—	March 25, 2003	Palomar	NEAT	·	1.3 km	MPC · JPL
298330	2003 FR_{59}	—	March 26, 2003	Palomar	NEAT	·	1.6 km	MPC · JPL
298331	2003 FZ_{86}	—	March 28, 2003	Kitt Peak	Spacewatch	·	1.1 km	MPC · JPL
298332	2003 FA_{111}	—	March 31, 2003	Anderson Mesa	LONEOS	·	1.9 km	MPC · JPL
298333	2003 FF_{111}	—	March 31, 2003	Kitt Peak	Spacewatch	·	3.6 km	MPC · JPL
298334	2003 FQ_{113}	—	March 31, 2003	Socorro	LINEAR	·	3.2 km	MPC · JPL
298335	2003 FL_{121}	—	March 25, 2003	Anderson Mesa	LONEOS	·	870 m	MPC · JPL
298336	2003 FP_{123}	—	March 27, 2003	Kitt Peak	Spacewatch	NYS	1.1 km	MPC · JPL
298337	2003 FZ_{130}	—	March 31, 2003	Palomar	NEAT	·	3.7 km	MPC · JPL
298338	2003 GG_{2}	—	April 1, 2003	Palomar	NEAT	·	2.3 km	MPC · JPL
298339	2003 GK_{9}	—	April 2, 2003	Socorro	LINEAR	·	1.5 km	MPC · JPL
298340	2003 GN_{12}	—	April 1, 2003	Socorro	LINEAR	fast	3.2 km	MPC · JPL
298341	2003 GK_{31}	—	April 8, 2003	Kitt Peak	Spacewatch	·	1.4 km	MPC · JPL
298342	2003 GM_{52}	—	April 1, 2003	Kitt Peak	M. W. Buie	·	1.0 km	MPC · JPL
298343	2003 HV_{6}	—	April 24, 2003	Kitt Peak	Spacewatch	·	3.1 km	MPC · JPL
298344	2003 HF_{10}	—	April 25, 2003	Kitt Peak	Spacewatch	NYS	1.0 km	MPC · JPL
298345	2003 HK_{21}	—	April 26, 2003	Kitt Peak	Spacewatch	·	3.2 km	MPC · JPL
298346	2003 HH_{31}	—	April 26, 2003	Kitt Peak	Spacewatch	NYS	1.1 km	MPC · JPL
298347	2003 HD_{42}	—	April 27, 2003	Socorro	LINEAR	·	2.6 km	MPC · JPL
298348	2003 HT_{43}	—	April 30, 2003	Kitt Peak	Spacewatch	·	3.6 km	MPC · JPL
298349	2003 JW_{10}	—	May 4, 2003	Kleť	J. Tichá, M. Tichý	·	970 m	MPC · JPL
298350	2003 JY_{14}	—	May 5, 2003	Kitt Peak	Spacewatch	·	850 m	MPC · JPL
298351	2003 KU_{9}	—	May 26, 2003	Kitt Peak	Spacewatch	·	1.3 km	MPC · JPL
298352	2003 KC_{11}	—	May 25, 2003	Haleakala	NEAT	·	2.0 km	MPC · JPL
298353	2003 KU_{16}	—	May 28, 2003	Emerald Lane	L. Ball	·	4.1 km	MPC · JPL
298354	2003 KW_{32}	—	May 27, 2003	Kitt Peak	Spacewatch	·	1.3 km	MPC · JPL
298355	2003 LD_{4}	—	June 3, 2003	Socorro	LINEAR	PHO	2.5 km	MPC · JPL
298356	2003 OE_{26}	—	July 24, 2003	Palomar	NEAT	·	1.9 km	MPC · JPL
298357	2003 OL_{32}	—	July 29, 2003	Mauna Kea	Torres, Y.	·	1.3 km	MPC · JPL
298358	2003 PQ_{8}	—	August 4, 2003	Socorro	LINEAR	·	1.8 km	MPC · JPL
298359	2003 QG_{29}	—	August 23, 2003	Palomar	NEAT	·	1.4 km	MPC · JPL
298360	2003 QV_{57}	—	August 23, 2003	Palomar	NEAT	H	650 m	MPC · JPL
298361	2003 QR_{59}	—	August 23, 2003	Socorro	LINEAR	·	1.5 km	MPC · JPL
298362	2003 QJ_{73}	—	August 25, 2003	Socorro	LINEAR	H	680 m	MPC · JPL
298363	2003 QH_{89}	—	August 26, 2003	Socorro	LINEAR	·	1.6 km	MPC · JPL
298364	2003 QM_{89}	—	August 26, 2003	Črni Vrh	Mikuž, H.	·	1.4 km	MPC · JPL
298365	2003 QQ_{92}	—	August 29, 2003	Haleakala	NEAT	·	1.7 km	MPC · JPL
298366	2003 QX_{95}	—	August 30, 2003	Kitt Peak	Spacewatch	RAF	810 m	MPC · JPL
298367	2003 QB_{103}	—	August 31, 2003	Kitt Peak	Spacewatch	H	550 m	MPC · JPL
298368	2003 QL_{105}	—	August 31, 2003	Haleakala	NEAT	H	740 m	MPC · JPL
298369	2003 QW_{109}	—	August 27, 2003	Palomar	NEAT	H	820 m	MPC · JPL
298370	2003 RK_{2}	—	September 3, 2003	Socorro	LINEAR	·	1.6 km	MPC · JPL
298371	2003 RY_{7}	—	September 4, 2003	Socorro	LINEAR	H	800 m	MPC · JPL
298372	2003 RW_{17}	—	September 15, 2003	Palomar	NEAT	NYS	1.5 km	MPC · JPL
298373	2003 SX_{2}	—	September 16, 2003	Palomar	NEAT	·	2.7 km	MPC · JPL
298374	2003 SZ_{3}	—	September 16, 2003	Kitt Peak	Spacewatch	·	1.4 km	MPC · JPL
298375	2003 SO_{31}	—	September 18, 2003	Kitt Peak	Spacewatch	·	1.2 km	MPC · JPL
298376	2003 SU_{45}	—	September 16, 2003	Anderson Mesa	LONEOS	T_{j} (2.97) · HIL · 3:2 · (6124)	6.1 km	MPC · JPL
298377	2003 SZ_{49}	—	September 18, 2003	Palomar	NEAT	·	3.2 km	MPC · JPL
298378	2003 SM_{51}	—	September 18, 2003	Palomar	NEAT	·	2.2 km	MPC · JPL
298379	2003 SP_{51}	—	September 18, 2003	Palomar	NEAT	·	1.8 km	MPC · JPL
298380	2003 ST_{58}	—	September 17, 2003	Anderson Mesa	LONEOS	·	1.5 km	MPC · JPL
298381	2003 SK_{72}	—	September 18, 2003	Kitt Peak	Spacewatch	H	840 m	MPC · JPL
298382	2003 SC_{76}	—	September 18, 2003	Kitt Peak	Spacewatch	·	1.1 km	MPC · JPL
298383	2003 SD_{101}	—	September 20, 2003	Palomar	NEAT	EUN	1.4 km	MPC · JPL
298384	2003 SA_{116}	—	September 16, 2003	Anderson Mesa	LONEOS	·	1.6 km	MPC · JPL
298385	2003 SU_{127}	—	September 20, 2003	Socorro	LINEAR	H	750 m	MPC · JPL
298386	2003 SQ_{134}	—	September 18, 2003	Haleakala	NEAT	H	690 m	MPC · JPL
298387	2003 SV_{148}	—	September 16, 2003	Kitt Peak	Spacewatch	·	1.3 km	MPC · JPL
298388	2003 SS_{149}	—	August 31, 2003	Haleakala	NEAT	·	1.4 km	MPC · JPL
298389	2003 SM_{166}	—	September 21, 2003	Kitt Peak	Spacewatch	·	1.4 km	MPC · JPL
298390	2003 SV_{171}	—	September 18, 2003	Kitt Peak	Spacewatch	·	1.9 km	MPC · JPL
298391	2003 SJ_{180}	—	September 19, 2003	Kitt Peak	Spacewatch	·	1.1 km	MPC · JPL
298392	2003 ST_{188}	—	September 22, 2003	Anderson Mesa	LONEOS	·	2.2 km	MPC · JPL
298393	2003 SW_{193}	—	September 20, 2003	Socorro	LINEAR	T_{j} (2.96) · 3:2	6.6 km	MPC · JPL
298394	2003 SN_{201}	—	September 26, 2003	Socorro	LINEAR	H	690 m	MPC · JPL
298395	2003 SA_{207}	—	September 26, 2003	Socorro	LINEAR	·	1.2 km	MPC · JPL
298396	2003 SE_{236}	—	September 26, 2003	Socorro	LINEAR	·	1.9 km	MPC · JPL
298397	2003 SE_{242}	—	September 27, 2003	Kitt Peak	Spacewatch	·	1.6 km	MPC · JPL
298398	2003 SM_{242}	—	September 27, 2003	Kitt Peak	Spacewatch	·	1.0 km	MPC · JPL
298399	2003 SR_{243}	—	September 28, 2003	Kitt Peak	Spacewatch	·	920 m	MPC · JPL
298400	2003 SR_{253}	—	September 27, 2003	Socorro	LINEAR	·	670 m	MPC · JPL

== 298401–298500 ==
back to top

Designation			Discovery			Properties		Ref
Permanent	Provisional	Named after	Date	Site	Discoverer(s)	Category	Diam.	Ref
298401	2003 SS_{261}	—	September 27, 2003	Socorro	LINEAR	·	3.2 km	MPC · JPL
298402	2003 SC_{263}	—	September 28, 2003	Socorro	LINEAR	·	1.8 km	MPC · JPL
298403	2003 SK_{268}	—	September 29, 2003	Kitt Peak	Spacewatch	(5)	1.1 km	MPC · JPL
298404	2003 SD_{269}	—	September 25, 2003	Uccle	T. Pauwels	·	1.0 km	MPC · JPL
298405	2003 SE_{270}	—	September 24, 2003	Haleakala	NEAT	·	1.3 km	MPC · JPL
298406	2003 SZ_{270}	—	September 25, 2003	Palomar	NEAT	·	1.4 km	MPC · JPL
298407	2003 SU_{271}	—	September 26, 2003	Palomar	NEAT	·	1.7 km	MPC · JPL
298408	2003 SL_{280}	—	September 18, 2003	Palomar	NEAT	·	1.5 km	MPC · JPL
298409	2003 SR_{294}	—	September 28, 2003	Socorro	LINEAR	·	2.3 km	MPC · JPL
298410	2003 SK_{296}	—	September 29, 2003	Anderson Mesa	LONEOS	·	3.2 km	MPC · JPL
298411	2003 SQ_{296}	—	September 29, 2003	Anderson Mesa	LONEOS	·	2.0 km	MPC · JPL
298412	2003 SB_{304}	—	September 17, 2003	Palomar	NEAT	·	2.0 km	MPC · JPL
298413	2003 SH_{307}	—	September 26, 2003	Socorro	LINEAR	·	2.1 km	MPC · JPL
298414	2003 ST_{307}	—	September 27, 2003	Socorro	LINEAR	fast	1.3 km	MPC · JPL
298415	2003 SF_{322}	—	September 27, 2003	Apache Point	SDSS	·	2.0 km	MPC · JPL
298416	2003 SO_{322}	—	September 30, 2003	Kitt Peak	Spacewatch	·	1.6 km	MPC · JPL
298417	2003 SK_{325}	—	September 17, 2003	Kitt Peak	Spacewatch	3:2	4.7 km	MPC · JPL
298418	2003 SW_{331}	—	September 27, 2003	Socorro	LINEAR	·	1.7 km	MPC · JPL
298419	2003 SP_{346}	—	September 18, 2003	Kitt Peak	Spacewatch	·	1.3 km	MPC · JPL
298420	2003 SO_{361}	—	September 22, 2003	Kitt Peak	Spacewatch	3:2	7.6 km	MPC · JPL
298421	2003 SR_{380}	—	September 26, 2003	Apache Point	SDSS	·	1.2 km	MPC · JPL
298422	2003 SV_{406}	—	September 27, 2003	Apache Point	SDSS	·	2.0 km	MPC · JPL
298423	2003 SB_{407}	—	September 27, 2003	Apache Point	SDSS	·	2.7 km	MPC · JPL
298424	2003 SG_{423}	—	September 19, 2003	Kitt Peak	Spacewatch	·	1.5 km	MPC · JPL
298425	2003 TU	—	October 3, 2003	Kingsnake	J. V. McClusky	H	950 m	MPC · JPL
298426	2003 TJ_{12}	—	October 14, 2003	Anderson Mesa	LONEOS	(5)	1.1 km	MPC · JPL
298427	2003 TW_{15}	—	October 15, 2003	Anderson Mesa	LONEOS	·	1.5 km	MPC · JPL
298428	2003 TR_{51}	—	October 5, 2003	Socorro	LINEAR	H	890 m	MPC · JPL
298429	2003 TN_{53}	—	October 5, 2003	Kitt Peak	Spacewatch	·	1.6 km	MPC · JPL
298430	2003 TF_{57}	—	October 5, 2003	Socorro	LINEAR	·	2.1 km	MPC · JPL
298431	2003 TO_{58}	—	October 5, 2003	Socorro	LINEAR	·	1.4 km	MPC · JPL
298432	2003 UY_{1}	—	October 16, 2003	Kitt Peak	Spacewatch	·	1.8 km	MPC · JPL
298433	2003 US_{10}	—	October 19, 2003	Palomar	NEAT	·	2.2 km	MPC · JPL
298434	2003 UT_{10}	—	October 19, 2003	Palomar	NEAT	·	1.1 km	MPC · JPL
298435	2003 UO_{13}	—	October 19, 2003	Palomar	NEAT	H	750 m	MPC · JPL
298436	2003 UG_{16}	—	October 16, 2003	Anderson Mesa	LONEOS	·	2.2 km	MPC · JPL
298437	2003 UN_{19}	—	October 20, 2003	Kingsnake	J. V. McClusky	EUN	1.3 km	MPC · JPL
298438	2003 UU_{20}	—	October 21, 2003	Socorro	LINEAR	H	1.1 km	MPC · JPL
298439	2003 UB_{24}	—	October 23, 2003	Junk Bond	Junk Bond	(5)	1.3 km	MPC · JPL
298440	2003 UQ_{28}	—	October 19, 2003	Kitt Peak	Spacewatch	·	1.6 km	MPC · JPL
298441	2003 UW_{31}	—	October 16, 2003	Kitt Peak	Spacewatch	EUN	880 m	MPC · JPL
298442	2003 UQ_{34}	—	October 17, 2003	Kitt Peak	Spacewatch	·	1.1 km	MPC · JPL
298443	2003 UV_{36}	—	October 16, 2003	Palomar	NEAT	EUN	1.7 km	MPC · JPL
298444	2003 UD_{46}	—	October 18, 2003	Kitt Peak	Spacewatch	·	2.4 km	MPC · JPL
298445	2003 US_{53}	—	October 18, 2003	Palomar	NEAT	·	1.4 km	MPC · JPL
298446	2003 UQ_{55}	—	October 18, 2003	Palomar	NEAT	(5)	1.4 km	MPC · JPL
298447	2003 UE_{56}	—	October 19, 2003	Goodricke-Pigott	R. A. Tucker	·	1.1 km	MPC · JPL
298448	2003 UM_{58}	—	October 16, 2003	Kitt Peak	Spacewatch	·	1.8 km	MPC · JPL
298449	2003 US_{64}	—	October 16, 2003	Anderson Mesa	LONEOS	·	2.0 km	MPC · JPL
298450	2003 UH_{68}	—	October 16, 2003	Kitt Peak	Spacewatch	·	1.5 km	MPC · JPL
298451	2003 UF_{73}	—	October 19, 2003	Kitt Peak	Spacewatch	·	1.3 km	MPC · JPL
298452	2003 UF_{76}	—	October 17, 2003	Anderson Mesa	LONEOS	·	1.3 km	MPC · JPL
298453	2003 UA_{78}	—	October 17, 2003	Kitt Peak	Spacewatch	(5)	1.6 km	MPC · JPL
298454	2003 UG_{84}	—	October 18, 2003	Kitt Peak	Spacewatch	·	1.2 km	MPC · JPL
298455	2003 UC_{89}	—	October 19, 2003	Kitt Peak	Spacewatch	(194)	1.6 km	MPC · JPL
298456	2003 UV_{95}	—	October 18, 2003	Kitt Peak	Spacewatch	3:2	5.8 km	MPC · JPL
298457	2003 UF_{109}	—	October 19, 2003	Palomar	NEAT	·	1.7 km	MPC · JPL
298458	2003 UX_{119}	—	October 18, 2003	Kitt Peak	Spacewatch	(5)	1.3 km	MPC · JPL
298459	2003 UY_{126}	—	October 21, 2003	Kitt Peak	Spacewatch	·	1.5 km	MPC · JPL
298460	2003 UF_{128}	—	October 21, 2003	Kitt Peak	Spacewatch	·	1.9 km	MPC · JPL
298461	2003 UV_{128}	—	October 21, 2003	Kitt Peak	Spacewatch	(5)	840 m	MPC · JPL
298462	2003 UJ_{142}	—	October 18, 2003	Anderson Mesa	LONEOS	(194)	2.0 km	MPC · JPL
298463	2003 UM_{145}	—	October 18, 2003	Anderson Mesa	LONEOS	·	1.2 km	MPC · JPL
298464	2003 UL_{150}	—	October 20, 2003	Kitt Peak	Spacewatch	·	1.3 km	MPC · JPL
298465	2003 UG_{151}	—	October 21, 2003	Kitt Peak	Spacewatch	·	1.8 km	MPC · JPL
298466	2003 UQ_{158}	—	October 20, 2003	Kitt Peak	Spacewatch	EUN	1.4 km	MPC · JPL
298467	2003 UW_{169}	—	October 22, 2003	Kitt Peak	Spacewatch	·	1.1 km	MPC · JPL
298468	2003 UW_{188}	—	October 22, 2003	Kitt Peak	Spacewatch	·	2.2 km	MPC · JPL
298469	2003 UE_{197}	—	October 21, 2003	Kitt Peak	Spacewatch	·	1.4 km	MPC · JPL
298470	2003 UY_{199}	—	October 21, 2003	Socorro	LINEAR	·	1.1 km	MPC · JPL
298471	2003 UA_{201}	—	October 21, 2003	Socorro	LINEAR	·	1.8 km	MPC · JPL
298472	2003 UO_{202}	—	October 21, 2003	Socorro	LINEAR	·	1.4 km	MPC · JPL
298473	2003 UT_{205}	—	October 22, 2003	Socorro	LINEAR	·	1.3 km	MPC · JPL
298474	2003 UW_{205}	—	October 22, 2003	Socorro	LINEAR	·	4.8 km	MPC · JPL
298475	2003 UY_{211}	—	October 23, 2003	Kitt Peak	Spacewatch	·	1.8 km	MPC · JPL
298476	2003 UE_{212}	—	October 23, 2003	Kitt Peak	Spacewatch	·	1.8 km	MPC · JPL
298477	2003 UZ_{215}	—	October 21, 2003	Kitt Peak	Spacewatch	(5)	1.1 km	MPC · JPL
298478	2003 UR_{218}	—	October 21, 2003	Socorro	LINEAR	·	1.6 km	MPC · JPL
298479	2003 UH_{225}	—	October 22, 2003	Kitt Peak	Spacewatch	·	1.7 km	MPC · JPL
298480	2003 UN_{227}	—	October 23, 2003	Kitt Peak	Spacewatch	·	1.5 km	MPC · JPL
298481	2003 UZ_{232}	—	October 24, 2003	Socorro	LINEAR	·	1.1 km	MPC · JPL
298482	2003 UW_{238}	—	October 24, 2003	Socorro	LINEAR	·	1.7 km	MPC · JPL
298483	2003 UL_{249}	—	October 25, 2003	Socorro	LINEAR	·	1.3 km	MPC · JPL
298484	2003 UQ_{261}	—	October 26, 2003	Kitt Peak	Spacewatch	HIL · 3:2	5.9 km	MPC · JPL
298485	2003 UT_{261}	—	October 26, 2003	Kitt Peak	Spacewatch	·	1.7 km	MPC · JPL
298486	2003 UK_{264}	—	October 27, 2003	Socorro	LINEAR	·	1.5 km	MPC · JPL
298487	2003 US_{264}	—	October 27, 2003	Socorro	LINEAR	·	2.5 km	MPC · JPL
298488	2003 UY_{265}	—	October 27, 2003	Haleakala	NEAT	(5)	1.5 km	MPC · JPL
298489	2003 UX_{266}	—	October 28, 2003	Socorro	LINEAR	·	1.4 km	MPC · JPL
298490	2003 UR_{268}	—	October 28, 2003	Socorro	LINEAR	·	1.3 km	MPC · JPL
298491	2003 UD_{276}	—	October 29, 2003	Catalina	CSS	BRG	2.3 km	MPC · JPL
298492	2003 UO_{276}	—	October 30, 2003	Socorro	LINEAR	(5)	1.5 km	MPC · JPL
298493	2003 UP_{280}	—	October 27, 2003	Socorro	LINEAR	(5)	1.5 km	MPC · JPL
298494	2003 US_{282}	—	October 29, 2003	Anderson Mesa	LONEOS	·	2.4 km	MPC · JPL
298495	2003 UB_{287}	—	October 22, 2003	Kitt Peak	M. W. Buie	·	1.6 km	MPC · JPL
298496	2003 UG_{315}	—	October 19, 2003	Apache Point	SDSS	·	700 m	MPC · JPL
298497	2003 UW_{343}	—	November 3, 1999	Kitt Peak	Spacewatch	·	1.2 km	MPC · JPL
298498	2003 UD_{345}	—	October 19, 2003	Apache Point	SDSS	3:2	6.3 km	MPC · JPL
298499	2003 UU_{367}	—	October 21, 2003	Kitt Peak	Spacewatch	·	900 m	MPC · JPL
298500	2003 US_{373}	—	October 22, 2003	Apache Point	SDSS	·	1.9 km	MPC · JPL

== 298501–298600 ==
back to top

Designation			Discovery			Properties		Ref
Permanent	Provisional	Named after	Date	Site	Discoverer(s)	Category	Diam.	Ref
298501	2003 UC_{415}	—	October 17, 2003	Kitt Peak	Spacewatch	·	1.2 km	MPC · JPL
298502	2003 VD_{2}	—	November 3, 2003	Socorro	LINEAR	H	790 m	MPC · JPL
298503	2003 VT_{2}	—	November 6, 2003	Socorro	LINEAR	·	2.6 km	MPC · JPL
298504	2003 VD_{7}	—	November 15, 2003	Kitt Peak	Spacewatch	·	1.4 km	MPC · JPL
298505	2003 VG_{9}	—	November 15, 2003	Palomar	NEAT	·	1.4 km	MPC · JPL
298506	2003 VK_{9}	—	November 15, 2003	Palomar	NEAT	EUN	1.8 km	MPC · JPL
298507	2003 VD_{11}	—	November 15, 2003	Palomar	NEAT	·	1.2 km	MPC · JPL
298508	2003 WU	—	November 16, 2003	Catalina	CSS	·	1.6 km	MPC · JPL
298509	2003 WQ_{6}	—	November 18, 2003	Kitt Peak	Spacewatch	(5)	1.3 km	MPC · JPL
298510	2003 WU_{9}	—	November 18, 2003	Kitt Peak	Spacewatch	MAR	1.6 km	MPC · JPL
298511	2003 WO_{13}	—	November 16, 2003	Kitt Peak	Spacewatch	·	1.1 km	MPC · JPL
298512	2003 WL_{17}	—	November 18, 2003	Palomar	NEAT	·	3.2 km	MPC · JPL
298513	2003 WF_{19}	—	November 19, 2003	Socorro	LINEAR	·	1.5 km	MPC · JPL
298514	2003 WX_{19}	—	November 19, 2003	Socorro	LINEAR	·	2.8 km	MPC · JPL
298515	2003 WB_{28}	—	November 16, 2003	Kitt Peak	Spacewatch	·	1.5 km	MPC · JPL
298516	2003 WN_{28}	—	November 16, 2003	Kitt Peak	Spacewatch	(5)	1.5 km	MPC · JPL
298517	2003 WE_{32}	—	November 18, 2003	Kitt Peak	Spacewatch	(5)	1.5 km	MPC · JPL
298518	2003 WY_{32}	—	November 18, 2003	Palomar	NEAT	·	1.5 km	MPC · JPL
298519	2003 WB_{33}	—	November 18, 2003	Palomar	NEAT	·	2.6 km	MPC · JPL
298520	2003 WH_{35}	—	November 19, 2003	Socorro	LINEAR	EUN	1.5 km	MPC · JPL
298521	2003 WC_{38}	—	November 19, 2003	Socorro	LINEAR	HNS	2.0 km	MPC · JPL
298522	2003 WE_{40}	—	November 19, 2003	Kitt Peak	Spacewatch	(5)	1.5 km	MPC · JPL
298523	2003 WX_{40}	—	November 19, 2003	Kitt Peak	Spacewatch	(5)	1.4 km	MPC · JPL
298524	2003 WL_{41}	—	November 19, 2003	Kitt Peak	Spacewatch	·	1.6 km	MPC · JPL
298525	2003 WF_{51}	—	November 19, 2003	Kitt Peak	Spacewatch	BRG	1.5 km	MPC · JPL
298526	2003 WM_{66}	—	November 19, 2003	Kitt Peak	Spacewatch	·	2.9 km	MPC · JPL
298527	2003 WQ_{72}	—	November 20, 2003	Socorro	LINEAR	·	1 km	MPC · JPL
298528	2003 WS_{78}	—	November 20, 2003	Socorro	LINEAR	(5)	1.4 km	MPC · JPL
298529	2003 WE_{81}	—	November 20, 2003	Kitt Peak	Spacewatch	·	1.5 km	MPC · JPL
298530	2003 WM_{91}	—	November 18, 2003	Kitt Peak	Spacewatch	(5)	1.1 km	MPC · JPL
298531	2003 WG_{97}	—	November 19, 2003	Anderson Mesa	LONEOS	·	1.5 km	MPC · JPL
298532	2003 WA_{99}	—	November 20, 2003	Socorro	LINEAR	·	1.2 km	MPC · JPL
298533	2003 WG_{104}	—	November 21, 2003	Socorro	LINEAR	(5)	1.3 km	MPC · JPL
298534	2003 WN_{111}	—	November 20, 2003	Socorro	LINEAR	·	1.2 km	MPC · JPL
298535	2003 WM_{114}	—	November 20, 2003	Socorro	LINEAR	·	2.8 km	MPC · JPL
298536	2003 WT_{115}	—	November 20, 2003	Socorro	LINEAR	·	4.2 km	MPC · JPL
298537	2003 WB_{118}	—	November 20, 2003	Socorro	LINEAR	·	2.6 km	MPC · JPL
298538	2003 WF_{121}	—	November 20, 2003	Socorro	LINEAR	·	2.2 km	MPC · JPL
298539	2003 WM_{121}	—	November 20, 2003	Socorro	LINEAR	(5)	1.2 km	MPC · JPL
298540	2003 WJ_{124}	—	November 20, 2003	Socorro	LINEAR	EUN	1.5 km	MPC · JPL
298541	2003 WM_{126}	—	November 20, 2003	Socorro	LINEAR	(5)	2.2 km	MPC · JPL
298542	2003 WK_{128}	—	November 21, 2003	Kitt Peak	Spacewatch	·	1.2 km	MPC · JPL
298543	2003 WK_{130}	—	November 21, 2003	Socorro	LINEAR	(5)	1.7 km	MPC · JPL
298544	2003 WN_{133}	—	November 21, 2003	Socorro	LINEAR	·	2.2 km	MPC · JPL
298545	2003 WC_{136}	—	November 21, 2003	Socorro	LINEAR	·	2.0 km	MPC · JPL
298546	2003 WN_{136}	—	November 21, 2003	Socorro	LINEAR	·	2.5 km	MPC · JPL
298547	2003 WX_{140}	—	November 21, 2003	Socorro	LINEAR	EUN	1.7 km	MPC · JPL
298548	2003 WA_{147}	—	November 23, 2003	Kitt Peak	Spacewatch	·	1.8 km	MPC · JPL
298549	2003 WC_{147}	—	November 23, 2003	Kitt Peak	Spacewatch	(5)	1.3 km	MPC · JPL
298550	2003 WG_{148}	—	November 24, 2003	Socorro	LINEAR	·	2.4 km	MPC · JPL
298551	2003 WV_{149}	—	November 24, 2003	Anderson Mesa	LONEOS	HNS	1.6 km	MPC · JPL
298552	2003 WH_{151}	—	November 26, 2003	Kitt Peak	Spacewatch	·	1.6 km	MPC · JPL
298553	2003 WJ_{159}	—	November 29, 2003	Socorro	LINEAR	·	1.9 km	MPC · JPL
298554	2003 WJ_{165}	—	November 30, 2003	Kitt Peak	Spacewatch	·	1.2 km	MPC · JPL
298555	2003 WW_{171}	—	November 29, 2003	Socorro	LINEAR	·	1.7 km	MPC · JPL
298556	2003 WM_{188}	—	November 23, 2003	Socorro	LINEAR	·	4.1 km	MPC · JPL
298557	2003 XC_{2}	—	December 1, 2003	Socorro	LINEAR	·	1.4 km	MPC · JPL
298558	2003 XQ_{3}	—	December 1, 2003	Socorro	LINEAR	(5)	1.4 km	MPC · JPL
298559	2003 XX_{7}	—	December 3, 2003	Socorro	LINEAR	·	1.7 km	MPC · JPL
298560	2003 XM_{8}	—	December 4, 2003	Socorro	LINEAR	·	2.3 km	MPC · JPL
298561	2003 XV_{8}	—	December 4, 2003	Socorro	LINEAR	EUN	2.1 km	MPC · JPL
298562	2003 XR_{9}	—	December 4, 2003	Socorro	LINEAR	EUN	2.0 km	MPC · JPL
298563	2003 XC_{10}	—	December 4, 2003	Socorro	LINEAR	·	1.7 km	MPC · JPL
298564	2003 XM_{19}	—	December 15, 2003	Socorro	LINEAR	·	1.9 km	MPC · JPL
298565	2003 XZ_{20}	—	December 14, 2003	Kitt Peak	Spacewatch	·	1.6 km	MPC · JPL
298566	2003 XU_{31}	—	December 1, 2003	Kitt Peak	Spacewatch	·	2.2 km	MPC · JPL
298567	2003 XH_{39}	—	December 4, 2003	Socorro	LINEAR	·	2.3 km	MPC · JPL
298568	2003 XK_{39}	—	December 5, 2003	Catalina	CSS	·	1.7 km	MPC · JPL
298569	2003 XU_{40}	—	December 14, 2003	Kitt Peak	Spacewatch	·	1.4 km	MPC · JPL
298570	2003 XK_{43}	—	December 4, 2003	Socorro	LINEAR	(5)	1.6 km	MPC · JPL
298571	2003 YC_{6}	—	December 17, 2003	Socorro	LINEAR	·	2.6 km	MPC · JPL
298572	2003 YV_{7}	—	December 19, 2003	Socorro	LINEAR	·	2.0 km	MPC · JPL
298573	2003 YA_{8}	—	December 17, 2003	Socorro	LINEAR	H	800 m	MPC · JPL
298574	2003 YX_{9}	—	December 17, 2003	Kitt Peak	Spacewatch	·	1.9 km	MPC · JPL
298575	2003 YL_{11}	—	December 17, 2003	Socorro	LINEAR	·	1.3 km	MPC · JPL
298576	2003 YX_{11}	—	December 17, 2003	Socorro	LINEAR	·	2.5 km	MPC · JPL
298577	2003 YB_{12}	—	December 17, 2003	Socorro	LINEAR	·	2.0 km	MPC · JPL
298578	2003 YC_{20}	—	December 17, 2003	Kitt Peak	Spacewatch	·	2.2 km	MPC · JPL
298579	2003 YV_{21}	—	December 17, 2003	Kitt Peak	Spacewatch	·	2.8 km	MPC · JPL
298580	2003 YA_{25}	—	December 18, 2003	Socorro	LINEAR	·	2.1 km	MPC · JPL
298581	2003 YE_{27}	—	December 16, 2003	Catalina	CSS	EUN	2.0 km	MPC · JPL
298582	2003 YG_{29}	—	December 17, 2003	Kitt Peak	Spacewatch	ADE	2.5 km	MPC · JPL
298583	2003 YS_{32}	—	December 16, 2003	Kitt Peak	Spacewatch	·	1.6 km	MPC · JPL
298584	2003 YZ_{33}	—	December 17, 2003	Anderson Mesa	LONEOS	·	1.9 km	MPC · JPL
298585	2003 YF_{35}	—	December 18, 2003	Haleakala	NEAT	·	1.7 km	MPC · JPL
298586	2003 YF_{43}	—	December 19, 2003	Kitt Peak	Spacewatch	·	1.8 km	MPC · JPL
298587	2003 YG_{47}	—	December 17, 2003	Kitt Peak	Spacewatch	·	2.0 km	MPC · JPL
298588	2003 YF_{56}	—	December 19, 2003	Socorro	LINEAR	·	2.6 km	MPC · JPL
298589	2003 YL_{56}	—	December 19, 2003	Socorro	LINEAR	·	2.4 km	MPC · JPL
298590	2003 YC_{62}	—	December 19, 2003	Socorro	LINEAR	MIS	3.2 km	MPC · JPL
298591	2003 YE_{64}	—	December 19, 2003	Socorro	LINEAR	·	2.4 km	MPC · JPL
298592	2003 YS_{64}	—	December 19, 2003	Socorro	LINEAR	·	1.9 km	MPC · JPL
298593	2003 YA_{71}	—	December 18, 2003	Socorro	LINEAR	·	3.0 km	MPC · JPL
298594	2003 YZ_{88}	—	December 19, 2003	Socorro	LINEAR	(5)	1.9 km	MPC · JPL
298595	2003 YC_{105}	—	December 21, 2003	Catalina	CSS	·	2.6 km	MPC · JPL
298596	2003 YM_{114}	—	December 25, 2003	Haleakala	NEAT	·	2.2 km	MPC · JPL
298597	2003 YT_{120}	—	December 27, 2003	Socorro	LINEAR	·	1.7 km	MPC · JPL
298598	2003 YP_{123}	—	December 28, 2003	Kitt Peak	Spacewatch	EUN	1.5 km	MPC · JPL
298599	2003 YN_{124}	—	December 28, 2003	Kitt Peak	Spacewatch	·	2.1 km	MPC · JPL
298600	2003 YM_{129}	—	December 27, 2003	Socorro	LINEAR	·	2.2 km	MPC · JPL

== 298601–298700 ==
back to top

Designation			Discovery			Properties		Ref
Permanent	Provisional	Named after	Date	Site	Discoverer(s)	Category	Diam.	Ref
298601	2003 YM_{131}	—	December 28, 2003	Socorro	LINEAR	·	2.5 km	MPC · JPL
298602	2003 YY_{131}	—	December 28, 2003	Socorro	LINEAR	(194)	2.3 km	MPC · JPL
298603	2003 YC_{132}	—	December 28, 2003	Socorro	LINEAR	·	1.8 km	MPC · JPL
298604	2003 YG_{133}	—	December 28, 2003	Socorro	LINEAR	(5)	2.0 km	MPC · JPL
298605	2003 YB_{135}	—	December 28, 2003	Socorro	LINEAR	·	2.7 km	MPC · JPL
298606	2003 YO_{137}	—	December 27, 2003	Socorro	LINEAR	(5)	1.8 km	MPC · JPL
298607	2003 YZ_{137}	—	December 27, 2003	Socorro	LINEAR	EUN	1.8 km	MPC · JPL
298608	2003 YH_{143}	—	December 28, 2003	Socorro	LINEAR	·	2.7 km	MPC · JPL
298609	2003 YH_{144}	—	December 28, 2003	Socorro	LINEAR	·	1.9 km	MPC · JPL
298610	2003 YY_{146}	—	December 29, 2003	Socorro	LINEAR	·	2.3 km	MPC · JPL
298611	2003 YK_{151}	—	December 29, 2003	Catalina	CSS	·	3.1 km	MPC · JPL
298612	2003 YA_{154}	—	December 29, 2003	Catalina	CSS	·	2.3 km	MPC · JPL
298613	2003 YH_{169}	—	December 18, 2003	Socorro	LINEAR	·	1.3 km	MPC · JPL
298614	2003 YD_{179}	—	December 19, 2003	Kitt Peak	Spacewatch	L5	13 km	MPC · JPL
298615	2004 AE_{8}	—	January 13, 2004	Palomar	NEAT	·	1.2 km	MPC · JPL
298616	2004 AG_{9}	—	January 14, 2004	Palomar	NEAT	EUN	1.9 km	MPC · JPL
298617	2004 AH_{12}	—	January 13, 2004	Kitt Peak	Spacewatch	·	2.9 km	MPC · JPL
298618	2004 AO_{13}	—	January 13, 2004	Kitt Peak	Spacewatch	·	1.6 km	MPC · JPL
298619	2004 AW_{15}	—	December 21, 2003	Kitt Peak	Spacewatch	HOF	2.8 km	MPC · JPL
298620	2004 AS_{19}	—	April 13, 1996	Kitt Peak	Spacewatch	·	2.1 km	MPC · JPL
298621	2004 AF_{26}	—	January 13, 2004	Palomar	NEAT	·	1.7 km	MPC · JPL
298622	2004 BA_{1}	—	January 16, 2004	Kitt Peak	Spacewatch	WIT	1.2 km	MPC · JPL
298623	2004 BZ_{2}	—	January 16, 2004	Palomar	NEAT	·	1.6 km	MPC · JPL
298624	2004 BH_{10}	—	January 16, 2004	Palomar	NEAT	·	3.2 km	MPC · JPL
298625	2004 BC_{13}	—	January 17, 2004	Palomar	NEAT	MRX	1.3 km	MPC · JPL
298626	2004 BD_{14}	—	January 17, 2004	Palomar	NEAT	·	2.4 km	MPC · JPL
298627	2004 BB_{15}	—	January 16, 2004	Kitt Peak	Spacewatch	·	2.2 km	MPC · JPL
298628	2004 BA_{19}	—	January 16, 2004	Palomar	NEAT	EUN	2.4 km	MPC · JPL
298629	2004 BV_{19}	—	January 18, 2004	Kitt Peak	Spacewatch	·	1.9 km	MPC · JPL
298630	2004 BF_{27}	—	January 19, 2004	Socorro	LINEAR	·	1.4 km	MPC · JPL
298631	2004 BO_{27}	—	January 18, 2004	Kitt Peak	Spacewatch	·	2.3 km	MPC · JPL
298632	2004 BG_{36}	—	January 19, 2004	Kitt Peak	Spacewatch	·	2.1 km	MPC · JPL
298633	2004 BD_{37}	—	January 19, 2004	Kitt Peak	Spacewatch	·	1.8 km	MPC · JPL
298634	2004 BS_{37}	—	January 19, 2004	Catalina	CSS	·	2.2 km	MPC · JPL
298635	2004 BM_{41}	—	January 23, 2004	Wrightwood	J. W. Young	·	2.8 km	MPC · JPL
298636	2004 BD_{42}	—	January 19, 2004	Catalina	CSS	·	2.1 km	MPC · JPL
298637	2004 BY_{53}	—	January 22, 2004	Socorro	LINEAR	·	2.3 km	MPC · JPL
298638	2004 BA_{54}	—	January 22, 2004	Socorro	LINEAR	·	2.4 km	MPC · JPL
298639	2004 BZ_{54}	—	January 22, 2004	Socorro	LINEAR	MRX	1.2 km	MPC · JPL
298640	2004 BQ_{77}	—	January 22, 2004	Socorro	LINEAR	AGN	1.4 km	MPC · JPL
298641	2004 BV_{78}	—	January 22, 2004	Socorro	LINEAR	·	1.8 km	MPC · JPL
298642	2004 BT_{83}	—	January 23, 2004	Anderson Mesa	LONEOS	·	7.4 km	MPC · JPL
298643	2004 BA_{88}	—	January 23, 2004	Socorro	LINEAR	·	3.0 km	MPC · JPL
298644	2004 BG_{90}	—	January 24, 2004	Socorro	LINEAR	·	1.9 km	MPC · JPL
298645	2004 BT_{90}	—	January 24, 2004	Socorro	LINEAR	AEO	1.9 km	MPC · JPL
298646	2004 BH_{94}	—	January 23, 2004	Socorro	LINEAR	·	2.4 km	MPC · JPL
298647	2004 BG_{102}	—	January 29, 2004	Kitt Peak	Spacewatch	·	4.3 km	MPC · JPL
298648	2004 BX_{105}	—	January 26, 2004	Anderson Mesa	LONEOS	NEM	3.3 km	MPC · JPL
298649	2004 BA_{107}	—	January 28, 2004	Kitt Peak	Spacewatch	MIS	2.9 km	MPC · JPL
298650	2004 BZ_{110}	—	January 29, 2004	Socorro	LINEAR	·	2.7 km	MPC · JPL
298651	2004 BJ_{113}	—	January 28, 2004	Catalina	CSS	EUN	1.5 km	MPC · JPL
298652	2004 BV_{118}	—	January 30, 2004	Catalina	CSS	·	2.5 km	MPC · JPL
298653	2004 BJ_{148}	—	January 16, 2004	Palomar	NEAT	·	2.1 km	MPC · JPL
298654	2004 BO_{158}	—	January 28, 2004	Kitt Peak	Spacewatch	·	1.9 km	MPC · JPL
298655	2004 CS_{2}	—	February 12, 2004	Goodricke-Pigott	R. A. Tucker	GEF	1.7 km	MPC · JPL
298656	2004 CW_{10}	—	February 11, 2004	Palomar	NEAT	·	2.6 km	MPC · JPL
298657	2004 CV_{13}	—	February 11, 2004	Palomar	NEAT	·	3.3 km	MPC · JPL
298658	2004 CB_{19}	—	February 11, 2004	Kitt Peak	Spacewatch	MRX	1.2 km	MPC · JPL
298659	2004 CL_{23}	—	February 12, 2004	Kitt Peak	Spacewatch	·	1.6 km	MPC · JPL
298660	2004 CT_{28}	—	February 12, 2004	Kitt Peak	Spacewatch	·	1.8 km	MPC · JPL
298661	2004 CW_{32}	—	February 12, 2004	Kitt Peak	Spacewatch	·	2.1 km	MPC · JPL
298662	2004 CB_{42}	—	February 10, 2004	Palomar	NEAT	·	3.1 km	MPC · JPL
298663	2004 CT_{42}	—	February 11, 2004	Kitt Peak	Spacewatch	MRX	1.4 km	MPC · JPL
298664	2004 CL_{56}	—	February 14, 2004	Haleakala	NEAT	AGN	1.6 km	MPC · JPL
298665	2004 CW_{57}	—	February 14, 2004	Socorro	LINEAR	fast	2.6 km	MPC · JPL
298666	2004 CE_{59}	—	February 10, 2004	Palomar	NEAT	·	3.5 km	MPC · JPL
298667	2004 CZ_{61}	—	February 11, 2004	Kitt Peak	Spacewatch	·	3.7 km	MPC · JPL
298668	2004 CW_{65}	—	February 15, 2004	Socorro	LINEAR	·	2.6 km	MPC · JPL
298669	2004 CD_{77}	—	February 11, 2004	Catalina	CSS	·	2.8 km	MPC · JPL
298670	2004 CS_{82}	—	February 12, 2004	Kitt Peak	Spacewatch	·	2.4 km	MPC · JPL
298671	2004 CA_{91}	—	February 12, 2004	Kitt Peak	Spacewatch	HOF	3.0 km	MPC · JPL
298672	2004 CW_{100}	—	February 15, 2004	Catalina	CSS	·	3.8 km	MPC · JPL
298673	2004 CF_{103}	—	February 12, 2004	Palomar	NEAT	·	2.0 km	MPC · JPL
298674	2004 CJ_{107}	—	February 14, 2004	Kitt Peak	Spacewatch	·	2.6 km	MPC · JPL
298675	2004 CX_{109}	—	February 13, 2004	Kitt Peak	Spacewatch	·	1.7 km	MPC · JPL
298676	2004 CU_{116}	—	February 11, 2004	Catalina	CSS	·	2.6 km	MPC · JPL
298677	2004 CD_{122}	—	February 12, 2004	Kitt Peak	Spacewatch	PAD	2.0 km	MPC · JPL
298678	2004 CK_{125}	—	February 12, 2004	Kitt Peak	Spacewatch	KOR	1.7 km	MPC · JPL
298679	2004 DP_{15}	—	February 17, 2004	Socorro	LINEAR	GEF	1.2 km	MPC · JPL
298680	2004 DJ_{25}	—	February 19, 2004	Socorro	LINEAR	·	1.0 km	MPC · JPL
298681	2004 DL_{27}	—	February 16, 2004	Kitt Peak	Spacewatch	·	2.2 km	MPC · JPL
298682	2004 DV_{30}	—	February 17, 2004	Socorro	LINEAR	·	3.1 km	MPC · JPL
298683	2004 DK_{32}	—	February 18, 2004	Socorro	LINEAR	·	2.3 km	MPC · JPL
298684	2004 DT_{35}	—	February 19, 2004	Socorro	LINEAR	·	2.5 km	MPC · JPL
298685	2004 DA_{39}	—	February 22, 2004	Kitt Peak	Spacewatch	AGN	1.5 km	MPC · JPL
298686	2004 DW_{41}	—	February 19, 2004	Socorro	LINEAR	·	2.2 km	MPC · JPL
298687	2004 DS_{44}	—	February 17, 2004	Haleakala	NEAT	EUN	1.7 km	MPC · JPL
298688	2004 DQ_{46}	—	February 19, 2004	Socorro	LINEAR	·	3.9 km	MPC · JPL
298689	2004 DO_{61}	—	February 26, 2004	Socorro	LINEAR	·	1.9 km	MPC · JPL
298690	2004 DX_{64}	—	February 17, 2004	Kitt Peak	Spacewatch	·	2.4 km	MPC · JPL
298691	2004 DY_{67}	—	February 26, 2004	Kitt Peak	M. W. Buie	·	2.3 km	MPC · JPL
298692	2004 DL_{70}	—	February 26, 2004	Socorro	LINEAR	·	2.4 km	MPC · JPL
298693	2004 EC_{6}	—	March 11, 2004	Palomar	NEAT	·	4.3 km	MPC · JPL
298694	2004 EL_{12}	—	March 11, 2004	Palomar	NEAT	AGN	1.7 km	MPC · JPL
298695	2004 EV_{13}	—	March 11, 2004	Palomar	NEAT	·	3.0 km	MPC · JPL
298696	2004 EM_{14}	—	March 11, 2004	Palomar	NEAT	·	2.7 km	MPC · JPL
298697	2004 EC_{18}	—	March 12, 2004	Palomar	NEAT	·	3.4 km	MPC · JPL
298698	2004 EH_{39}	—	March 15, 2004	Kitt Peak	Spacewatch	·	3.0 km	MPC · JPL
298699	2004 EG_{48}	—	March 15, 2004	Socorro	LINEAR	·	2.5 km	MPC · JPL
298700	2004 EX_{50}	—	March 14, 2004	Kitt Peak	Spacewatch	·	2.5 km	MPC · JPL

== 298701–298800 ==
back to top

Designation			Discovery			Properties		Ref
Permanent	Provisional	Named after	Date	Site	Discoverer(s)	Category	Diam.	Ref
298701	2004 EW_{54}	—	March 14, 2004	Palomar	NEAT	·	3.5 km	MPC · JPL
298702	2004 EL_{55}	—	March 14, 2004	Palomar	NEAT	·	4.4 km	MPC · JPL
298703	2004 EP_{55}	—	March 14, 2004	Palomar	NEAT	·	2.6 km	MPC · JPL
298704	2004 EQ_{66}	—	March 14, 2004	Palomar	NEAT	·	2.2 km	MPC · JPL
298705	2004 EY_{66}	—	March 14, 2004	Palomar	NEAT	T_{j} (2.99)	4.4 km	MPC · JPL
298706	2004 EU_{89}	—	March 14, 2004	Kitt Peak	Spacewatch	·	4.4 km	MPC · JPL
298707	2004 EV_{90}	—	March 14, 2004	Kitt Peak	Spacewatch	EOS	2.1 km	MPC · JPL
298708	2004 EJ_{92}	—	March 15, 2004	Kitt Peak	Spacewatch	·	2.3 km	MPC · JPL
298709	2004 ES_{100}	—	March 15, 2004	Kitt Peak	Spacewatch	·	2.1 km	MPC · JPL
298710	2004 FZ_{12}	—	March 16, 2004	Catalina	CSS	·	2.7 km	MPC · JPL
298711	2004 FU_{13}	—	March 16, 2004	Socorro	LINEAR	EOS	2.5 km	MPC · JPL
298712	2004 FR_{14}	—	March 16, 2004	Catalina	CSS	·	6.2 km	MPC · JPL
298713	2004 FC_{24}	—	March 17, 2004	Kitt Peak	Spacewatch	·	2.7 km	MPC · JPL
298714	2004 FJ_{25}	—	March 17, 2004	Socorro	LINEAR	·	3.5 km	MPC · JPL
298715	2004 FT_{35}	—	March 16, 2004	Socorro	LINEAR	·	2.3 km	MPC · JPL
298716	2004 FS_{49}	—	March 18, 2004	Socorro	LINEAR	·	3.3 km	MPC · JPL
298717	2004 FV_{57}	—	March 17, 2004	Kitt Peak	Spacewatch	KOR	1.3 km	MPC · JPL
298718	2004 FM_{58}	—	March 17, 2004	Kitt Peak	Spacewatch	·	2.0 km	MPC · JPL
298719	2004 FF_{62}	—	March 19, 2004	Socorro	LINEAR	BRA	2.4 km	MPC · JPL
298720	2004 FY_{69}	—	March 16, 2004	Kitt Peak	Spacewatch	·	4.3 km	MPC · JPL
298721	2004 FY_{72}	—	March 17, 2004	Kitt Peak	Spacewatch	·	2.4 km	MPC · JPL
298722	2004 FT_{73}	—	March 17, 2004	Kitt Peak	Spacewatch	·	730 m	MPC · JPL
298723	2004 FS_{93}	—	March 22, 2004	Socorro	LINEAR	·	2.5 km	MPC · JPL
298724	2004 FH_{99}	—	March 21, 2004	Kitt Peak	Spacewatch	·	2.5 km	MPC · JPL
298725	2004 FC_{102}	—	March 19, 2004	Socorro	LINEAR	T_{j} (2.99) · EUP	4.5 km	MPC · JPL
298726	2004 FH_{107}	—	March 20, 2004	Socorro	LINEAR	·	2.8 km	MPC · JPL
298727	2004 FO_{108}	—	March 23, 2004	Socorro	LINEAR	DOR	2.9 km	MPC · JPL
298728	2004 FP_{112}	—	March 26, 2004	Kitt Peak	Spacewatch	·	3.3 km	MPC · JPL
298729	2004 FJ_{134}	—	March 26, 2004	Socorro	LINEAR	·	3.6 km	MPC · JPL
298730	2004 FA_{140}	—	March 26, 2004	Socorro	LINEAR	T_{j} (2.98)	7.5 km	MPC · JPL
298731	2004 FN_{145}	—	March 30, 2004	Kitt Peak	Spacewatch	KOR	1.9 km	MPC · JPL
298732	2004 FB_{148}	—	March 17, 2004	Socorro	LINEAR	TIR	2.9 km	MPC · JPL
298733	2004 FF_{155}	—	March 17, 2004	Kitt Peak	Spacewatch	·	2.4 km	MPC · JPL
298734	2004 GB_{5}	—	April 11, 2004	Palomar	NEAT	·	3.1 km	MPC · JPL
298735	2004 GB_{9}	—	April 12, 2004	Kitt Peak	Spacewatch	EOS	2.3 km	MPC · JPL
298736	2004 GU_{14}	—	April 13, 2004	Palomar	NEAT	·	5.9 km	MPC · JPL
298737	2004 GQ_{35}	—	April 13, 2004	Palomar	NEAT	·	880 m	MPC · JPL
298738	2004 GD_{36}	—	April 13, 2004	Palomar	NEAT	·	4.0 km	MPC · JPL
298739	2004 GH_{41}	—	April 12, 2004	Siding Spring	SSS	·	5.4 km	MPC · JPL
298740	2004 GT_{42}	—	April 15, 2004	Anderson Mesa	LONEOS	·	3.0 km	MPC · JPL
298741	2004 GZ_{45}	—	April 12, 2004	Kitt Peak	Spacewatch	·	2.5 km	MPC · JPL
298742	2004 GK_{54}	—	April 13, 2004	Kitt Peak	Spacewatch	·	2.0 km	MPC · JPL
298743	2004 GM_{56}	—	April 13, 2004	Kitt Peak	Spacewatch	·	3.0 km	MPC · JPL
298744	2004 GM_{62}	—	April 13, 2004	Kitt Peak	Spacewatch	KOR	1.7 km	MPC · JPL
298745	2004 GL_{66}	—	April 13, 2004	Kitt Peak	Spacewatch	·	2.6 km	MPC · JPL
298746	2004 GU_{66}	—	April 13, 2004	Kitt Peak	Spacewatch	·	2.5 km	MPC · JPL
298747	2004 GU_{76}	—	April 15, 2004	Socorro	LINEAR	·	2.2 km	MPC · JPL
298748	2004 GU_{78}	—	April 11, 2004	Palomar	NEAT	·	2.8 km	MPC · JPL
298749	2004 GA_{79}	—	April 11, 2004	Palomar	NEAT	·	3.6 km	MPC · JPL
298750	2004 GY_{82}	—	April 14, 2004	Kitt Peak	Spacewatch	EOS	2.0 km	MPC · JPL
298751	2004 HC_{9}	—	April 16, 2004	Palomar	NEAT	·	840 m	MPC · JPL
298752	2004 HA_{17}	—	April 16, 2004	Kitt Peak	Spacewatch	BRA	2.2 km	MPC · JPL
298753	2004 HU_{27}	—	April 20, 2004	Socorro	LINEAR	·	3.1 km	MPC · JPL
298754	2004 HA_{42}	—	April 20, 2004	Kitt Peak	Spacewatch	·	3.0 km	MPC · JPL
298755	2004 HB_{42}	—	April 20, 2004	Kitt Peak	Spacewatch	·	3.2 km	MPC · JPL
298756	2004 HD_{45}	—	April 21, 2004	Socorro	LINEAR	·	3.4 km	MPC · JPL
298757	2004 HW_{47}	—	April 22, 2004	Siding Spring	SSS	EOS	2.9 km	MPC · JPL
298758	2004 HT_{56}	—	April 24, 2004	Catalina	CSS	T_{j} (2.99)	3.9 km	MPC · JPL
298759	2004 HP_{57}	—	April 21, 2004	Kitt Peak	Spacewatch	THM	2.3 km	MPC · JPL
298760	2004 HU_{67}	—	April 20, 2004	Kitt Peak	Spacewatch	·	2.7 km	MPC · JPL
298761	2004 HL_{71}	—	April 25, 2004	Kitt Peak	Spacewatch	·	2.5 km	MPC · JPL
298762 Sarahgallagher	2004 HT_{77}	Sarahgallagher	April 26, 2004	Mauna Kea	P. A. Wiegert	·	830 m	MPC · JPL
298763	2004 JD_{29}	—	May 15, 2004	Socorro	LINEAR	·	4.4 km	MPC · JPL
298764	2004 JU_{33}	—	May 15, 2004	Socorro	LINEAR	·	4.5 km	MPC · JPL
298765	2004 KC_{15}	—	May 21, 2004	Needville	J. Dellinger, D. Wells	EOS	2.8 km	MPC · JPL
298766	2004 LW_{16}	—	June 14, 2004	Socorro	LINEAR	·	730 m	MPC · JPL
298767	2004 NS_{3}	—	July 9, 2004	Palomar	NEAT	·	940 m	MPC · JPL
298768	2004 NO_{4}	—	July 12, 2004	Siding Spring	SSS	PHO	1.5 km	MPC · JPL
298769	2004 NE_{6}	—	July 11, 2004	Socorro	LINEAR	·	770 m	MPC · JPL
298770	2004 NL_{10}	—	July 9, 2004	Socorro	LINEAR	·	1.1 km	MPC · JPL
298771	2004 NE_{18}	—	July 14, 2004	Socorro	LINEAR	·	750 m	MPC · JPL
298772	2004 OU_{3}	—	July 17, 2004	Socorro	LINEAR	(883)	780 m	MPC · JPL
298773	2004 OK_{5}	—	July 16, 2004	Socorro	LINEAR	·	970 m	MPC · JPL
298774	2004 PH_{1}	—	August 6, 2004	Reedy Creek	J. Broughton	·	1.0 km	MPC · JPL
298775	2004 PH_{8}	—	August 6, 2004	Palomar	NEAT	·	760 m	MPC · JPL
298776	2004 PL_{8}	—	August 6, 2004	Palomar	NEAT	·	860 m	MPC · JPL
298777	2004 PQ_{17}	—	August 8, 2004	Socorro	LINEAR	·	820 m	MPC · JPL
298778	2004 PC_{19}	—	August 8, 2004	Anderson Mesa	LONEOS	·	910 m	MPC · JPL
298779	2004 PW_{20}	—	January 7, 1999	Kitt Peak	Spacewatch	·	860 m	MPC · JPL
298780	2004 PP_{38}	—	August 9, 2004	Socorro	LINEAR	·	810 m	MPC · JPL
298781	2004 PU_{43}	—	August 6, 2004	Palomar	NEAT	·	920 m	MPC · JPL
298782	2004 PX_{44}	—	August 7, 2004	Palomar	NEAT	·	1.0 km	MPC · JPL
298783	2004 PD_{45}	—	August 7, 2004	Palomar	NEAT	·	920 m	MPC · JPL
298784	2004 PU_{46}	—	August 8, 2004	Campo Imperatore	CINEOS	·	790 m	MPC · JPL
298785	2004 PU_{47}	—	August 8, 2004	Socorro	LINEAR	·	630 m	MPC · JPL
298786	2004 PS_{50}	—	August 8, 2004	Socorro	LINEAR	·	700 m	MPC · JPL
298787	2004 PO_{81}	—	August 10, 2004	Socorro	LINEAR	·	770 m	MPC · JPL
298788	2004 PO_{87}	—	August 11, 2004	Socorro	LINEAR	·	880 m	MPC · JPL
298789	2004 PS_{98}	—	August 8, 2004	Socorro	LINEAR	·	1.1 km	MPC · JPL
298790	2004 PC_{99}	—	August 8, 2004	Palomar	NEAT	·	960 m	MPC · JPL
298791	2004 PZ_{101}	—	August 11, 2004	Socorro	LINEAR	·	1.6 km	MPC · JPL
298792	2004 PJ_{106}	—	August 14, 2004	Campo Imperatore	CINEOS	V	920 m	MPC · JPL
298793	2004 QE_{3}	—	August 18, 2004	Wrightwood	J. W. Young	·	970 m	MPC · JPL
298794	2004 QH_{3}	—	August 20, 2004	Reedy Creek	J. Broughton	·	970 m	MPC · JPL
298795	2004 QG_{6}	—	August 20, 2004	Kitt Peak	Spacewatch	·	840 m	MPC · JPL
298796	2004 QY_{8}	—	August 19, 2004	Siding Spring	SSS	·	1.1 km	MPC · JPL
298797	2004 QX_{9}	—	August 21, 2004	Siding Spring	SSS	·	1.0 km	MPC · JPL
298798	2004 QA_{14}	—	August 24, 2004	Socorro	LINEAR	·	1.4 km	MPC · JPL
298799	2004 QC_{19}	—	August 22, 2004	Kvistaberg	Uppsala-DLR Asteroid Survey	·	1.2 km	MPC · JPL
298800	2004 QT_{21}	—	August 25, 2004	Kitt Peak	Spacewatch	·	930 m	MPC · JPL

== 298801–298900 ==
back to top

Designation			Discovery			Properties		Ref
Permanent	Provisional	Named after	Date	Site	Discoverer(s)	Category	Diam.	Ref
298801	2004 QD_{22}	—	August 25, 2004	Socorro	LINEAR	PHO	1.6 km	MPC · JPL
298802	2004 QR_{26}	—	August 23, 2004	Anderson Mesa	LONEOS	·	860 m	MPC · JPL
298803	2004 RJ_{8}	—	September 6, 2004	Altschwendt	W. Ries	·	1.2 km	MPC · JPL
298804	2004 RZ_{13}	—	September 6, 2004	Siding Spring	SSS	·	810 m	MPC · JPL
298805	2004 RZ_{14}	—	September 6, 2004	Siding Spring	SSS	·	800 m	MPC · JPL
298806	2004 RV_{25}	—	September 9, 2004	Socorro	LINEAR	V	800 m	MPC · JPL
298807	2004 RS_{31}	—	September 7, 2004	Socorro	LINEAR	·	1.1 km	MPC · JPL
298808	2004 RV_{33}	—	September 7, 2004	Socorro	LINEAR	(2076)	1.1 km	MPC · JPL
298809	2004 RF_{36}	—	September 7, 2004	Socorro	LINEAR	NYS	1.4 km	MPC · JPL
298810	2004 RJ_{47}	—	September 8, 2004	Socorro	LINEAR	V	800 m	MPC · JPL
298811	2004 RR_{51}	—	September 8, 2004	Socorro	LINEAR	V	830 m	MPC · JPL
298812	2004 RZ_{56}	—	September 8, 2004	Socorro	LINEAR	·	800 m	MPC · JPL
298813	2004 RS_{57}	—	September 8, 2004	Socorro	LINEAR	·	1.2 km	MPC · JPL
298814	2004 RO_{60}	—	September 8, 2004	Socorro	LINEAR	·	1.5 km	MPC · JPL
298815	2004 RX_{60}	—	September 8, 2004	Socorro	LINEAR	·	970 m	MPC · JPL
298816	2004 RM_{62}	—	September 8, 2004	Socorro	LINEAR	·	810 m	MPC · JPL
298817	2004 RP_{63}	—	September 8, 2004	Socorro	LINEAR	·	870 m	MPC · JPL
298818	2004 RU_{64}	—	September 8, 2004	Socorro	LINEAR	·	810 m	MPC · JPL
298819	2004 RN_{66}	—	September 8, 2004	Socorro	LINEAR	·	1.3 km	MPC · JPL
298820	2004 RT_{71}	—	September 8, 2004	Socorro	LINEAR	·	970 m	MPC · JPL
298821	2004 RS_{73}	—	September 8, 2004	Socorro	LINEAR	·	1.0 km	MPC · JPL
298822	2004 RM_{74}	—	September 8, 2004	Socorro	LINEAR	·	1.1 km	MPC · JPL
298823	2004 RA_{79}	—	September 8, 2004	Palomar	NEAT	·	1.3 km	MPC · JPL
298824	2004 RB_{80}	—	September 9, 2004	Socorro	LINEAR	·	890 m	MPC · JPL
298825	2004 RD_{100}	—	September 8, 2004	Socorro	LINEAR	·	970 m	MPC · JPL
298826	2004 RY_{102}	—	September 8, 2004	Socorro	LINEAR	·	840 m	MPC · JPL
298827	2004 RO_{125}	—	September 7, 2004	Kitt Peak	Spacewatch	·	810 m	MPC · JPL
298828	2004 RZ_{143}	—	September 8, 2004	Socorro	LINEAR	·	1.3 km	MPC · JPL
298829	2004 RH_{147}	—	September 9, 2004	Socorro	LINEAR	·	860 m	MPC · JPL
298830	2004 RF_{156}	—	September 10, 2004	Socorro	LINEAR	·	830 m	MPC · JPL
298831	2004 RN_{160}	—	September 10, 2004	Socorro	LINEAR	·	1.2 km	MPC · JPL
298832	2004 RA_{164}	—	September 10, 2004	Kitt Peak	Spacewatch	·	980 m	MPC · JPL
298833	2004 RD_{164}	—	September 10, 2004	Socorro	LINEAR	·	770 m	MPC · JPL
298834	2004 RT_{164}	—	September 13, 2004	Eskridge	G. Hug	·	1.4 km	MPC · JPL
298835	2004 RN_{178}	—	September 10, 2004	Socorro	LINEAR	(2076)	880 m	MPC · JPL
298836	2004 RQ_{179}	—	September 10, 2004	Socorro	LINEAR	·	1.0 km	MPC · JPL
298837	2004 RO_{181}	—	September 10, 2004	Socorro	LINEAR	·	1.1 km	MPC · JPL
298838	2004 RP_{186}	—	September 10, 2004	Socorro	LINEAR	V	810 m	MPC · JPL
298839	2004 RP_{187}	—	September 10, 2004	Socorro	LINEAR	·	1.4 km	MPC · JPL
298840	2004 RX_{187}	—	September 10, 2004	Socorro	LINEAR	V	980 m	MPC · JPL
298841	2004 RM_{188}	—	September 10, 2004	Socorro	LINEAR	·	1.2 km	MPC · JPL
298842	2004 RL_{189}	—	September 10, 2004	Socorro	LINEAR	PHO	1.6 km	MPC · JPL
298843	2004 RX_{189}	—	September 10, 2004	Socorro	LINEAR	V	950 m	MPC · JPL
298844	2004 RL_{191}	—	September 10, 2004	Socorro	LINEAR	PHO	1.1 km	MPC · JPL
298845	2004 RM_{192}	—	September 10, 2004	Socorro	LINEAR	·	1.3 km	MPC · JPL
298846	2004 RK_{196}	—	September 10, 2004	Socorro	LINEAR	·	1.5 km	MPC · JPL
298847	2004 RD_{197}	—	September 10, 2004	Socorro	LINEAR	·	1.0 km	MPC · JPL
298848	2004 RQ_{205}	—	September 8, 2004	Socorro	LINEAR	·	1.2 km	MPC · JPL
298849	2004 RX_{214}	—	September 11, 2004	Socorro	LINEAR	·	1.2 km	MPC · JPL
298850	2004 RX_{232}	—	September 9, 2004	Kitt Peak	Spacewatch	·	920 m	MPC · JPL
298851	2004 RZ_{232}	—	September 9, 2004	Kitt Peak	Spacewatch	·	960 m	MPC · JPL
298852	2004 RK_{235}	—	September 10, 2004	Socorro	LINEAR	·	1.1 km	MPC · JPL
298853	2004 RZ_{235}	—	September 10, 2004	Socorro	LINEAR	·	1.2 km	MPC · JPL
298854	2004 RF_{236}	—	September 10, 2004	Socorro	LINEAR	·	1.2 km	MPC · JPL
298855	2004 RA_{237}	—	September 10, 2004	Kitt Peak	Spacewatch	·	970 m	MPC · JPL
298856	2004 RT_{246}	—	September 11, 2004	Socorro	LINEAR	·	1.3 km	MPC · JPL
298857	2004 RN_{250}	—	September 13, 2004	Socorro	LINEAR	·	820 m	MPC · JPL
298858	2004 RO_{250}	—	September 13, 2004	Socorro	LINEAR	·	1.3 km	MPC · JPL
298859	2004 RX_{250}	—	September 13, 2004	Palomar	NEAT	·	1.1 km	MPC · JPL
298860	2004 RP_{287}	—	September 15, 2004	7300	W. K. Y. Yeung	NYS	990 m	MPC · JPL
298861	2004 RM_{292}	—	September 10, 2004	Socorro	LINEAR	V	870 m	MPC · JPL
298862	2004 RW_{301}	—	September 11, 2004	Kitt Peak	Spacewatch	·	1.3 km	MPC · JPL
298863	2004 RF_{306}	—	September 12, 2004	Socorro	LINEAR	·	1.2 km	MPC · JPL
298864	2004 RW_{312}	—	September 15, 2004	Kitt Peak	Spacewatch	·	1.1 km	MPC · JPL
298865	2004 RJ_{319}	—	September 13, 2004	Socorro	LINEAR	·	830 m	MPC · JPL
298866	2004 RA_{326}	—	September 13, 2004	Socorro	LINEAR	·	1.8 km	MPC · JPL
298867	2004 RH_{328}	—	September 15, 2004	Anderson Mesa	LONEOS	HIL · 3:2 · (3561)	7.8 km	MPC · JPL
298868	2004 RJ_{328}	—	September 15, 2004	Anderson Mesa	LONEOS	·	960 m	MPC · JPL
298869	2004 RN_{333}	—	September 15, 2004	Anderson Mesa	LONEOS	(2076)	1.1 km	MPC · JPL
298870	2004 RQ_{334}	—	September 15, 2004	Anderson Mesa	LONEOS	·	1.3 km	MPC · JPL
298871	2004 RR_{334}	—	September 15, 2004	Anderson Mesa	LONEOS	·	770 m	MPC · JPL
298872	2004 RG_{337}	—	September 15, 2004	Kitt Peak	Spacewatch	·	780 m	MPC · JPL
298873	2004 SE_{10}	—	September 16, 2004	Siding Spring	SSS	(2076)	1.1 km	MPC · JPL
298874	2004 SP_{15}	—	September 17, 2004	Anderson Mesa	LONEOS	·	1.1 km	MPC · JPL
298875	2004 SB_{17}	—	September 17, 2004	Anderson Mesa	LONEOS	·	1.3 km	MPC · JPL
298876	2004 SW_{23}	—	September 17, 2004	Kitt Peak	Spacewatch	·	1.7 km	MPC · JPL
298877 Michaelreynolds	2004 SY_{26}	Michaelreynolds	September 23, 2004	Vail-Jarnac	Jarnac	·	650 m	MPC · JPL
298878	2004 SJ_{29}	—	September 17, 2004	Socorro	LINEAR	·	1.2 km	MPC · JPL
298879	2004 SJ_{32}	—	September 17, 2004	Socorro	LINEAR	·	1.2 km	MPC · JPL
298880	2004 SE_{33}	—	September 17, 2004	Socorro	LINEAR	·	1.2 km	MPC · JPL
298881	2004 SS_{34}	—	September 17, 2004	Kitt Peak	Spacewatch	·	990 m	MPC · JPL
298882	2004 SJ_{39}	—	September 17, 2004	Socorro	LINEAR	·	1.6 km	MPC · JPL
298883	2004 SN_{39}	—	September 17, 2004	Socorro	LINEAR	·	1.8 km	MPC · JPL
298884	2004 SC_{46}	—	September 18, 2004	Socorro	LINEAR	·	980 m	MPC · JPL
298885	2004 SF_{46}	—	September 18, 2004	Socorro	LINEAR	·	890 m	MPC · JPL
298886	2004 SU_{46}	—	September 18, 2004	Socorro	LINEAR	·	1.1 km	MPC · JPL
298887	2004 SN_{48}	—	September 18, 2004	Socorro	LINEAR	·	1.2 km	MPC · JPL
298888	2004 SD_{61}	—	September 23, 2004	Goodricke-Pigott	R. A. Tucker	·	1.2 km	MPC · JPL
298889	2004 TB_{8}	—	October 5, 2004	Goodricke-Pigott	R. A. Tucker	T_{j} (2.95) · 3:2	9.9 km	MPC · JPL
298890	2004 TA_{14}	—	October 5, 2004	Goodricke-Pigott	R. A. Tucker	·	1.3 km	MPC · JPL
298891	2004 TP_{18}	—	October 13, 2004	Goodricke-Pigott	R. A. Tucker	·	970 m	MPC · JPL
298892	2004 TX_{19}	—	October 7, 2004	Kitt Peak	Spacewatch	·	910 m	MPC · JPL
298893	2004 TR_{31}	—	October 4, 2004	Kitt Peak	Spacewatch	·	2.0 km	MPC · JPL
298894	2004 TZ_{34}	—	October 4, 2004	Anderson Mesa	LONEOS	·	1.0 km	MPC · JPL
298895	2004 TD_{43}	—	October 4, 2004	Kitt Peak	Spacewatch	·	2.2 km	MPC · JPL
298896	2004 TL_{45}	—	October 4, 2004	Kitt Peak	Spacewatch	NYS	1.5 km	MPC · JPL
298897	2004 TX_{46}	—	October 4, 2004	Kitt Peak	Spacewatch	·	1.1 km	MPC · JPL
298898	2004 TR_{48}	—	October 4, 2004	Kitt Peak	Spacewatch	·	750 m	MPC · JPL
298899	2004 TR_{50}	—	October 4, 2004	Kitt Peak	Spacewatch	·	940 m	MPC · JPL
298900	2004 TR_{56}	—	October 5, 2004	Kitt Peak	Spacewatch	·	1.3 km	MPC · JPL

== 298901–299000 ==
back to top

Designation			Discovery			Properties		Ref
Permanent	Provisional	Named after	Date	Site	Discoverer(s)	Category	Diam.	Ref
298901	2004 TU_{57}	—	October 5, 2004	Kitt Peak	Spacewatch	NYS	1.1 km	MPC · JPL
298902	2004 TU_{63}	—	October 5, 2004	Kitt Peak	Spacewatch	·	1.2 km	MPC · JPL
298903	2004 TV_{66}	—	October 5, 2004	Anderson Mesa	LONEOS	NYS	940 m	MPC · JPL
298904	2004 TZ_{67}	—	October 5, 2004	Anderson Mesa	LONEOS	·	1.4 km	MPC · JPL
298905	2004 TL_{71}	—	October 6, 2004	Kitt Peak	Spacewatch	NYS	990 m	MPC · JPL
298906	2004 TB_{73}	—	October 6, 2004	Kitt Peak	Spacewatch	·	1.7 km	MPC · JPL
298907	2004 TT_{75}	—	October 6, 2004	Palomar	NEAT	·	1.5 km	MPC · JPL
298908	2004 TR_{79}	—	October 4, 2004	Kitt Peak	Spacewatch	·	1.1 km	MPC · JPL
298909	2004 TF_{83}	—	October 5, 2004	Kitt Peak	Spacewatch	·	850 m	MPC · JPL
298910	2004 TN_{84}	—	April 4, 2003	Kitt Peak	Spacewatch	·	1.2 km	MPC · JPL
298911	2004 TU_{89}	—	October 5, 2004	Anderson Mesa	LONEOS	·	1.1 km	MPC · JPL
298912	2004 TF_{99}	—	October 5, 2004	Kitt Peak	Spacewatch	NYS	910 m	MPC · JPL
298913	2004 TJ_{101}	—	October 6, 2004	Kitt Peak	Spacewatch	MAS	840 m	MPC · JPL
298914	2004 TU_{102}	—	October 6, 2004	Palomar	NEAT	·	1.7 km	MPC · JPL
298915	2004 TD_{103}	—	October 6, 2004	Palomar	NEAT	·	1.1 km	MPC · JPL
298916	2004 TT_{103}	—	October 7, 2004	Anderson Mesa	LONEOS	·	870 m	MPC · JPL
298917	2004 TO_{107}	—	October 7, 2004	Kitt Peak	Spacewatch	·	980 m	MPC · JPL
298918	2004 TB_{114}	—	October 7, 2004	Palomar	NEAT	NYS ·	1.3 km	MPC · JPL
298919	2004 TB_{116}	—	October 3, 2004	Palomar	NEAT	V	890 m	MPC · JPL
298920	2004 TS_{117}	—	October 5, 2004	Anderson Mesa	LONEOS	·	1.0 km	MPC · JPL
298921	2004 TM_{126}	—	October 7, 2004	Socorro	LINEAR	·	1.1 km	MPC · JPL
298922	2004 TR_{126}	—	October 7, 2004	Socorro	LINEAR	·	990 m	MPC · JPL
298923	2004 TK_{136}	—	October 8, 2004	Anderson Mesa	LONEOS	V	750 m	MPC · JPL
298924	2004 TG_{148}	—	October 6, 2004	Kitt Peak	Spacewatch	·	900 m	MPC · JPL
298925	2004 TD_{151}	—	October 6, 2004	Kitt Peak	Spacewatch	PHO	980 m	MPC · JPL
298926	2004 TH_{151}	—	October 6, 2004	Kitt Peak	Spacewatch	·	1.3 km	MPC · JPL
298927	2004 TJ_{158}	—	October 6, 2004	Kitt Peak	Spacewatch	NYS	1.1 km	MPC · JPL
298928	2004 TK_{158}	—	October 6, 2004	Kitt Peak	Spacewatch	·	830 m	MPC · JPL
298929	2004 TQ_{160}	—	October 6, 2004	Kitt Peak	Spacewatch	·	970 m	MPC · JPL
298930	2004 TK_{162}	—	October 6, 2004	Kitt Peak	Spacewatch	V	830 m	MPC · JPL
298931	2004 TK_{168}	—	October 7, 2004	Socorro	LINEAR	·	950 m	MPC · JPL
298932	2004 TG_{176}	—	October 9, 2004	Socorro	LINEAR	·	1.4 km	MPC · JPL
298933	2004 TR_{188}	—	October 7, 2004	Kitt Peak	Spacewatch	MAS	960 m	MPC · JPL
298934	2004 TZ_{190}	—	October 7, 2004	Kitt Peak	Spacewatch	·	890 m	MPC · JPL
298935	2004 TW_{205}	—	October 7, 2004	Kitt Peak	Spacewatch	PHO	3.0 km	MPC · JPL
298936	2004 TU_{215}	—	October 10, 2004	Kitt Peak	Spacewatch	·	630 m	MPC · JPL
298937	2004 TU_{231}	—	October 8, 2004	Kitt Peak	Spacewatch	·	1.3 km	MPC · JPL
298938	2004 TO_{234}	—	October 8, 2004	Kitt Peak	Spacewatch	·	1.1 km	MPC · JPL
298939	2004 TU_{235}	—	October 8, 2004	Kitt Peak	Spacewatch	·	1.1 km	MPC · JPL
298940	2004 TQ_{237}	—	October 9, 2004	Socorro	LINEAR	slow	1.6 km	MPC · JPL
298941	2004 TW_{240}	—	October 10, 2004	Socorro	LINEAR	V	800 m	MPC · JPL
298942	2004 TY_{253}	—	October 9, 2004	Kitt Peak	Spacewatch	NYS	1.3 km	MPC · JPL
298943	2004 TJ_{274}	—	October 9, 2004	Kitt Peak	Spacewatch	NYS	1.4 km	MPC · JPL
298944	2004 TL_{275}	—	October 9, 2004	Kitt Peak	Spacewatch	NYS	1.3 km	MPC · JPL
298945	2004 TY_{286}	—	October 9, 2004	Socorro	LINEAR	·	1.0 km	MPC · JPL
298946	2004 TZ_{293}	—	October 10, 2004	Kitt Peak	Spacewatch	·	1.3 km	MPC · JPL
298947	2004 TD_{295}	—	October 10, 2004	Kitt Peak	Spacewatch	NYS	1.4 km	MPC · JPL
298948	2004 TN_{295}	—	October 10, 2004	Kitt Peak	Spacewatch	·	1.1 km	MPC · JPL
298949	2004 TL_{307}	—	October 10, 2004	Socorro	LINEAR	·	1.6 km	MPC · JPL
298950	2004 TM_{314}	—	October 11, 2004	Kitt Peak	Spacewatch	·	1.3 km	MPC · JPL
298951	2004 TF_{316}	—	October 11, 2004	Kitt Peak	Spacewatch	NYS	1.2 km	MPC · JPL
298952	2004 TN_{319}	—	October 11, 2004	Kitt Peak	Spacewatch	MAS	890 m	MPC · JPL
298953	2004 TG_{328}	—	October 4, 2004	Palomar	NEAT	·	1.4 km	MPC · JPL
298954	2004 TL_{335}	—	October 10, 2004	Kitt Peak	Spacewatch	MAS	860 m	MPC · JPL
298955	2004 TN_{349}	—	October 8, 2004	Kitt Peak	Spacewatch	·	1.6 km	MPC · JPL
298956	2004 TX_{353}	—	October 11, 2004	Kitt Peak	M. W. Buie	·	1.3 km	MPC · JPL
298957	2004 TW_{355}	—	October 7, 2004	Socorro	LINEAR	·	1.8 km	MPC · JPL
298958	2004 TN_{367}	—	October 13, 2004	Kitt Peak	Spacewatch	·	1.3 km	MPC · JPL
298959	2004 UV_{6}	—	October 20, 2004	Socorro	LINEAR	V	910 m	MPC · JPL
298960	2004 VH_{3}	—	November 3, 2004	Kitt Peak	Spacewatch	NYS	1.4 km	MPC · JPL
298961	2004 VY_{6}	—	November 3, 2004	Kitt Peak	Spacewatch	·	1.4 km	MPC · JPL
298962	2004 VV_{14}	—	November 4, 2004	Catalina	CSS	ERI	2.1 km	MPC · JPL
298963	2004 VM_{15}	—	November 5, 2004	Modra	A. Galád	·	1.6 km	MPC · JPL
298964	2004 VK_{16}	—	November 4, 2004	Catalina	CSS	·	1.1 km	MPC · JPL
298965	2004 VL_{17}	—	November 3, 2004	Kitt Peak	Spacewatch	NYS	990 m	MPC · JPL
298966	2004 VN_{17}	—	November 3, 2004	Kitt Peak	Spacewatch	NYS	1.5 km	MPC · JPL
298967	2004 VA_{19}	—	November 4, 2004	Kitt Peak	Spacewatch	·	1.8 km	MPC · JPL
298968	2004 VS_{27}	—	November 5, 2004	Palomar	NEAT	NYS	1.2 km	MPC · JPL
298969	2004 VL_{28}	—	November 7, 2004	Socorro	LINEAR	NYS	1.1 km	MPC · JPL
298970	2004 VN_{40}	—	November 4, 2004	Kitt Peak	Spacewatch	·	1.2 km	MPC · JPL
298971	2004 VB_{42}	—	November 4, 2004	Kitt Peak	Spacewatch	·	1.4 km	MPC · JPL
298972	2004 VS_{69}	—	November 4, 2004	Kitt Peak	Spacewatch	·	1.6 km	MPC · JPL
298973	2004 VN_{72}	—	November 5, 2004	Palomar	NEAT	·	1.4 km	MPC · JPL
298974	2004 VV_{73}	—	November 11, 2004	Anderson Mesa	LONEOS	·	1.4 km	MPC · JPL
298975	2004 VU_{81}	—	November 4, 2004	Catalina	CSS	·	1.2 km	MPC · JPL
298976	2004 VB_{90}	—	November 11, 2004	Kitt Peak	Spacewatch	·	880 m	MPC · JPL
298977	2004 VF_{112}	—	November 4, 2004	Catalina	CSS	·	1.2 km	MPC · JPL
298978	2004 WM	—	November 17, 2004	Siding Spring	SSS	·	1.3 km	MPC · JPL
298979	2004 WL_{1}	—	November 17, 2004	Campo Imperatore	CINEOS	·	1.2 km	MPC · JPL
298980	2004 WD_{5}	—	November 18, 2004	Socorro	LINEAR	NYS	1.6 km	MPC · JPL
298981	2004 WW_{10}	—	November 20, 2004	Kitt Peak	Spacewatch	·	1.1 km	MPC · JPL
298982	2004 WA_{11}	—	November 20, 2004	Kitt Peak	Spacewatch	MAS	880 m	MPC · JPL
298983	2004 WM_{11}	—	November 30, 2004	Anderson Mesa	LONEOS	·	1.1 km	MPC · JPL
298984	2004 XM_{6}	—	December 7, 2004	Socorro	LINEAR	PHO	1.7 km	MPC · JPL
298985	2004 XZ_{8}	—	December 2, 2004	Catalina	CSS	·	1.4 km	MPC · JPL
298986	2004 XD_{13}	—	December 8, 2004	Socorro	LINEAR	·	1.9 km	MPC · JPL
298987	2004 XB_{19}	—	December 8, 2004	Socorro	LINEAR	3:2	5.8 km	MPC · JPL
298988	2004 XX_{19}	—	December 8, 2004	Socorro	LINEAR	NYS	1.3 km	MPC · JPL
298989	2004 XZ_{19}	—	December 8, 2004	Socorro	LINEAR	NYS	1.5 km	MPC · JPL
298990	2004 XY_{23}	—	December 9, 2004	Socorro	LINEAR	·	1.1 km	MPC · JPL
298991	2004 XN_{24}	—	December 9, 2004	Catalina	CSS	·	1.4 km	MPC · JPL
298992	2004 XJ_{26}	—	December 9, 2004	Kitt Peak	Spacewatch	·	1.1 km	MPC · JPL
298993	2004 XO_{27}	—	December 10, 2004	Socorro	LINEAR	·	1.7 km	MPC · JPL
298994	2004 XE_{28}	—	December 10, 2004	Socorro	LINEAR	MAS	980 m	MPC · JPL
298995	2004 XH_{28}	—	December 10, 2004	Kitt Peak	Spacewatch	·	1.3 km	MPC · JPL
298996	2004 XC_{29}	—	December 10, 2004	Kitt Peak	Spacewatch	·	1.5 km	MPC · JPL
298997	2004 XD_{32}	—	December 10, 2004	Socorro	LINEAR	MAS	1.1 km	MPC · JPL
298998	2004 XG_{53}	—	December 10, 2004	Kitt Peak	Spacewatch	MAS	780 m	MPC · JPL
298999	2004 XE_{64}	—	December 2, 2004	Kitt Peak	Spacewatch	NYS	1.4 km	MPC · JPL
299000	2004 XF_{79}	—	December 10, 2004	Socorro	LINEAR	·	1.2 km	MPC · JPL

back to top

== See also ==
- Meanings of minor-planet names: 298001–299000
