= The Avenues (Jacksonville) =

Shopping mall in Jacksonville, Florida

Coordinates: 30.184664°N 81.554074°W

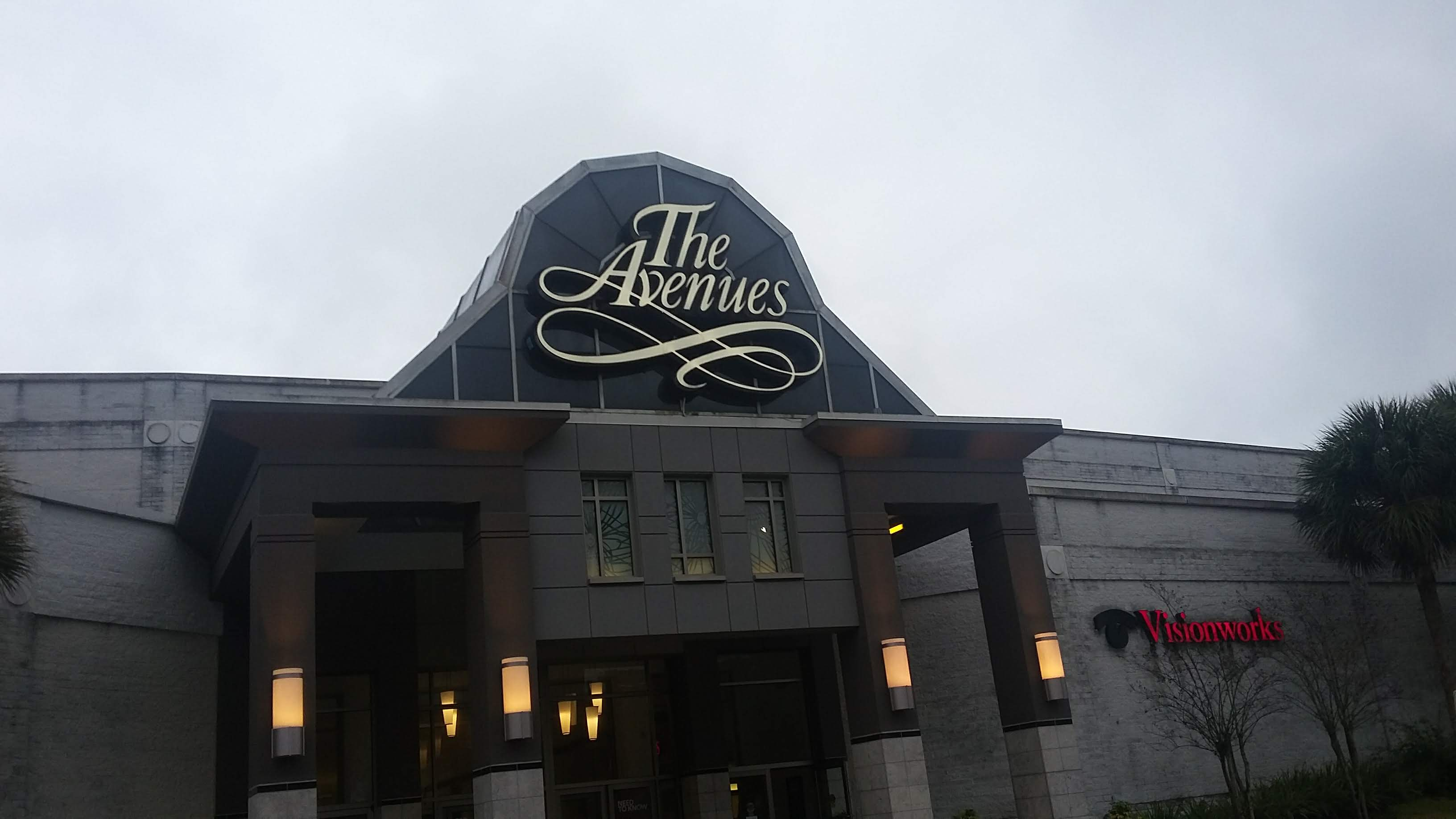
- Location: Jacksonville, Florida, United States
- Address: 10300 Southside Boulevard
- Opened: September 26, 1990
- Developer: CBL & Associates Properties
- Manager: Simon Property Group
- Owner: Simon Property Group (25%)
- Num. of stores: 138
- Num. of anchor tenants: 5
- Floor area: 1,112,428 sq ft (103,347.9 m^{2})
- Floors: 2 (3 in Parking Garage)
- Website: www.simon.com/mall/the-avenues

The Avenues (also referred to and often known as Avenues Mall) is a two-level regional shopping mall located on the southside of Jacksonville, Florida, and opened in 1990 on the Interstate 95 corridor, and is off exit 339 at the intersection of U.S. 1 (Philips Highway) and Southside Boulevard. The mall, managed by Simon Property Group, which manages 25% of it, has a parking deck on the northwestern side. Its anchor stores are Belk, Dillard's, JCPenney and furniture source. Other stores located at the mall include Aldo, H&M, LOFT, BoxLunch, Build-A-Bear Workshop, MAC, LUSH Fresh Handmade Cosmetics, Pandora, and Le Macaron French Pastries. There is currently an Elev8 Fun entertainment center under construction and expected to open as a future anchor.

== History ==
The mall opened on September 26, 1990 with JCPenney, Maison Blanche (originally slated to open as May-Cohen's/May Florida), and Sears, followed by the opening of Dillard's (first proposed as Ivey's, which was purchased on June 4) in 1991, along with another at Cool Springs Galleria. Furthermore, Parisian was dedicated in 1994, which was also done in that same year at Cool Springs and a year later at the brand new Seminole Towne Center. Maison Blanche changed twice-first to Gayfers in early 1992 and then Belk in late 1998.

A major renovation in 2005 featured a new entrance with stained glass, neutral paint colors to complement Italian limestone on the ground floor, replacing restrooms, ceilings, lighting, benches, lounge chairs, modernizing the glass elevator, and a new children's play area. Nearly $10.5 million was spent and the changes were completed in April.

On August 2, 2006, Saks Incorporated announced an agreement to sell its Parisian specialty department store business to Belk, Inc. Shortly thereafter, the Avenues Parisian store was briefly closed and converted into the men's and children's store, with the women's departments staying in the existing store, where Belk consolidated all of its departments in February 2010.

Since 2010, the mall has increasingly faced struggles due to marginalization from St. Johns Town Center and several long-time tenants vacating due to the ongoing retail apocalypse. Most of the mall's higher-end stores have moved to St. John's Town Center such as Gap, Banana Republic, Abercrombie & Fitch, Oakley, Pottery Barn, Ann Taylor, Williams-Sonoma, and Coach. Others have gone out of business or left the market such as Brookstone, The Body Shop, New York & Company, Justice, Skechers, Yankee Candle, Disney Store, Teavana, Gymboree, Jos. A. Bank, and The Walking Company among others.

On November 18, 2010, Forever 21 opened its doors in the location formerly occupied by the Belk Men and Kids store. It was Forever 21's second-largest location in the country and largest in the entire state of Florida, at 116,000 square feet (at the time, the space represented 8.8% of the mall's 1.1 million square feet). However, with the bankruptcy of the chain, Forever 21 closed in 2025.

H&M opened a two-story store at the mall on September 6, 2012.

In early 2014, Buffalo Wild Wings opened on the second floor.

On August 31, 2019, Sears announced that it would be closing this location as part of a plan to close 85 stores nationwide. The store closed in December 2019. It was replaced with furniture source sometime between 2021 and 2023.

In 2025, it was announced that Elev8 Fun would open a location in the former Forever21 as part of the company’s expansion. This adds a new entertainment option to the mall and will include an arcade, bowling alley, go-karts, and a restaurant. It is currently under construction.
