= Legal Tender =

Legal tender is a form of currency

Legal Tender may refer to:

- Legal Tender, novel in the Rosato & Associates series
- Legal Tender (film), a 1991 film
- "Legal Tender" (song), 1983 song
