= Le Macaron =

Bakery chain selling macarons

Le Macaron is a franchise in the United States selling macarons made of meringue with ganache filling in various flavors and colors, including Sicilian pistachio and black currant, and other confections. It was founded in 2009 by a French mother-daughter duo, Rosalie and Audrey Guillem, who opened their first store in Sarasota, Florida and subsequently expanded nationwide via franchises and corporate-owned locations. By 2019 they had more than fifty stores.
