= Florida State College at Jacksonville =

Public college Jacksonville, Florida, US

- Former names: Florida Junior College (1965–1986); Florida Community College at Jacksonville (1986–2009)
- Motto: Libertas (Latin)
- Motto in English: "Freedom"
- Type: Public college
- Established: 1965; 61 years ago
- Parent institution: Florida College System
- Accreditation: SACS
- Endowment: $28.5 million (2024)
- Budget: $148.1 million (2024)
- President: John Avendano
- Faculty: 327 (full-time); 540 (part-time)
- Undergraduates: 20,363 (fall 2022)
- Location: Jacksonville, Florida, United States; 30°20′05.0″N 81°39′35″W
- Campus: Large city
- Colors: Cyan and black
- Nickname: Manta Rays
- Sporting affiliations: NJCAA Region 8 – Mid-Florida Conference
- Mascot: Razor Ray the Manta Ray
- Website: www.fscj.edu

Florida State College at Jacksonville (FSCJ) is a public college in Jacksonville, Florida, United States. It is a member institution of the Florida College System, and offers a range of associate and baccalaureate degree programs. FSCJ is also known for its dual enrollment and early college programs.

== History ==
Established in 1965 as Florida Junior College, the institution was renamed Florida Community College at Jacksonville (FCCJ) in 1986. In 2009, in response to a shortage of four-year colleges, the Florida Legislature created the Florida College System, allowing some community colleges to become "state colleges" and offer bachelor degree programs. FCCJ transitioned to its current name, "Florida State College at Jacksonville," in 2009.

== Campuses ==
FSCJ has several campuses around Jacksonville:

- Downtown Campus: The main campus, offering associate and bachelor degree programs, continuing education, and vocational training, including construction, auto mechanics, and ESL. It also houses the Advanced Technology Center and the Urban Resource Center for online and military programs.
- North Campus: Located on the Northside, it features health programs like nursing and dental hygiene, the Culinary Institute of the South, and a cosmetology program, along with sports facilities for baseball, softball, and soccer.
- Kent Campus: On Roosevelt Boulevard, known for its all-brick design, and provides a variety of academic programs.
- South Campus: Situated on Beach Boulevard, it focuses on technical and liberal arts degrees and includes the Nathan H. Wilson Center for the Arts, fire rescue training, and a sports center for basketball, volleyball, and tennis. Many dual enrollment students use this campus.
- Betty P. Cook Nassau Center: In Yulee, it serves Nassau County with various courses and features the Outdoor Education Center and the Nassau County Yulee Library Branch.
- Cecil Center: This includes Cecil Center North for traditional courses and Cecil Center – Aviation Programs for aviation training.
- Deerwood Center: Located in Baymeadows, it offers a range of courses and is home to FSCJ’s information technology department.

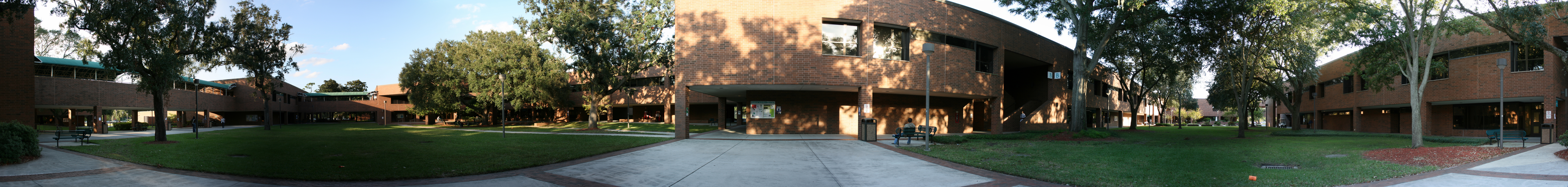
Kent Campus

== Athletics ==
FSCJ's athletic program includes men's and women's cross-country, volleyball, softball, basketball, and baseball. The college competes in the Mid-Florida Conference of the Florida State College Activities Association (FSCAA), governed by the National Junior College Athletic Association (NJCAA).

== Notable alumni ==
- Janet Adkins, member of the Florida House of Representatives
- Audrey Gibson, member of the Florida House of Representatives
- Alvin Heggs, professional basketball player
- Sam Jones, mayor of Mobile, Alabama
- Kelly Kelly, former WWE professional wrestler
- Tim McGraw, country music artist and actor (attended for one semester)
- Michael D. Reynolds, astronomer, NASA Teacher in Space finalist
- Kevin O'Sullivan, head baseball coach for the Florida Gators
