= Alexis Brandeker =

Swedish astronomer (born 1974)

Minor planets discovered: 4
36614 Saltis	August 27, 2000
(122310) 2000 QJ_{9}	August 21, 2000
239890 Edudeldon	September 1, 2000
297409 Mållgan	September 1, 2000

Alexis Brandeker (born May 18, 1974) is a Swedish astronomer at the Stockholm Observatory and discoverer of minor planets.

== Education ==
In 2003 he acquired his Ph.D. (on Young stars and circumstellar disks) from the Stockholm Observatory. He went on to become a post-doctoral fellow at the University of Toronto for 2.5 years before returning to Stockholm in 2007, where he now works as a research associate at the Stockholm Observatory. He is credited by the Minor Planet Center with the discovery of 4 minor planets in 2000.

== Publications ==
- Berger, E.; Rutledge, R. E.; Reid, I. N.; Bildsten, L.; Gizis, J. E.; Liebert, James; Martín, Eduardo L.; Basri, Gibor; Jayawardhana, R.; Brandeker, A.; Fleming, T. A.; Johns-Krull, C. M.; Giampapa, M. S.; Hawley, S. L.; Schmitt, J. H. M. M. (10 July 2005). "The Magnetic Properties of an L Dwarf Derived from Simultaneous Radio, X‐Ray, and Hα Observations". The Astrophysical Journal. 627 (2): 960–973. arXiv:astro-ph/0502384. Bibcode:2005ApJ...627..960B. doi:10.1086/430343. S2CID 119416828.
- Jayawardhana, Ray; Coffey, Jaime; Scholz, Alexander; Brandeker, Alexis; van Kerkwijk, Marten H. (10 September 2006). "Accretion Disks around Young Stars: Lifetimes, Disk Locking, and Variability". The Astrophysical Journal. 648 (2): 1206–1218. arXiv:astro-ph/0605601. Bibcode:2006ApJ...648.1206J. doi:10.1086/506171. S2CID 14630393.
- Mentuch, Erin; Brandeker, Alexis; van Kerkwijk, Marten H.; Jayawardhana, Ray; Hauschildt, Peter H. (20 December 2008). "Lithium Depletion of Nearby Young Stellar Associations". The Astrophysical Journal. 689 (2): 1127–1140. arXiv:0808.3584. Bibcode:2008ApJ...689.1127M. doi:10.1086/592764. S2CID 16859859.
- Brandeker, A.; Liseau, R.; Olofsson, G.; Fridlund, M. (January 2004). "The spatial structure of the ? Pictoris gas disk". Astronomy and Astrophysics. 413 (2): 681–691. arXiv:astro-ph/0310146. Bibcode:2004A&A...413..681B. doi:10.1051/0004-6361:20034326. S2CID 8158573.
