= Meanings of minor-planet names: 297001–298000 =

As minor planet discoveries are confirmed, they are given a permanent number by the IAU's Minor Planet Center (MPC), and the discoverers can then submit names for them, following the IAU's naming conventions. The list below concerns those minor planets in the specified number-range that have received names, and explains the meanings of those names.

Official naming citations of newly named small Solar System bodies are approved and published in a bulletin by IAU's Working Group for Small Bodies Nomenclature (WGSBN). Before May 2021, citations were published in MPC's Minor Planet Circulars for many decades. Recent citations can also be found on the JPL Small-Body Database (SBDB). Until his death in 2016, German astronomer Lutz D. Schmadel compiled these citations into the Dictionary of Minor Planet Names (DMP) and regularly updated the collection.

Based on Paul Herget's The Names of the Minor Planets, Schmadel also researched the unclear origin of numerous asteroids, most of which had been named prior to World War II. This article incorporates text from this source, which is in the public domain: SBDB New namings may only be added to this list below after official publication as the preannouncement of names is condemned. The WGSBN publishes a comprehensive guideline for the naming rules of non-cometary small Solar System bodies.

== 297001–297100 ==
Named minor planet	Provisional	This minor planet was named for...	Ref · Catalog
297005 Ellirichter	2010 FY_{48}	Elli Richter (1945–2014), sister of Albert Heller, a member of the TOTAS amateur survey team, who first spotted this asteroid.	JPL · 297005
297026 Corton	2010 GJ_{33}	Aloxe-Corton, a French village situated directly north of Beaune, in the famous Burgundy vineyard region	JPL · 297026
297082 Bygott	2010 KB_{21}	Kyle Bygott (born 1980) is an experienced flight software engineer at Ball Aerospace who developed and helps to operate the WISE/NEOWISE flight software.	JPL · 297082

== 297101–297200 ==
back to top

Named minor planet	Provisional	This minor planet was named for...	Ref · Catalog
297161 Subuchin	2010 VU_{26}	Su Buqing (1902–2003), was an academician of Chinese Academy of Sciences, is the founder of differential geometry in China. He discovered the well-known "Su-Cone" and "Su-Chain", and systematically developed the theory of projective differential geometry.	JPL · 297161

== 297201–297300 ==
back to top

Named minor planet	Provisional	This minor planet was named for...	Ref · Catalog
There are no named minor planets in this number range

== 297301–297400 ==
back to top

Named minor planet	Provisional	This minor planet was named for...	Ref · Catalog
297314 Ilterracottaio	1998 XV_{2}	Il terracottaio is someone who produces clay pottery and other clay artifacts. It is a typical job in the discoverers' home town, Montelupo Fiorentino.	IAU · 297314

== 297401–297500 ==
back to top

Named minor planet	Provisional	This minor planet was named for...	Ref · Catalog
297409 Mållgan	2000 RE_{39}	Mållgan (Malcolm in English), the imaginary friend of the fictitious character Alfie Atkins (Alfons Åberg), created by Swedish author Gunilla Bergström. Many young children have imaginary friends, although they tend to be abandoned with time. The naming of Mållgan is a tribute to all imaginary friends.	JPL · 297409

== 297501–297600 ==
back to top

Named minor planet	Provisional	This minor planet was named for...	Ref · Catalog
There are no named minor planets in this number range

== 297601–297700 ==
back to top

Named minor planet	Provisional	This minor planet was named for...	Ref · Catalog
There are no named minor planets in this number range

== 297701–297800 ==
back to top

Named minor planet	Provisional	This minor planet was named for...	Ref · Catalog
There are no named minor planets in this number range

== 297801–297900 ==
back to top

Named minor planet	Provisional	This minor planet was named for...	Ref · Catalog
There are no named minor planets in this number range

== 297901–298000 ==
back to top

Named minor planet	Provisional	This minor planet was named for...	Ref · Catalog
There are no named minor planets in this number range

back to top

Preceded by 296,001–297,000	Meanings of minor-planet names List of minor planets: 297,001–298,000	Succeeded by 298,001–299,000
