= List of minor planets: 297001–298000 =

The following is a partial list of minor planets, running from minor-planet number 297001 through 298000, inclusive. The primary data for this and other partial lists is based on JPL's "Small-Body Orbital Elements" and data available from the Minor Planet Center. Critical list information is also provided by the MPC, unless otherwise specified from Lowell Observatory. A detailed description of the table's columns and additional sources are given on the main page including a complete list of every page in this series, and a statistical break-up on the dynamical classification of minor planets.

Also see the summary list of all named bodies in numerical and alphabetical order, and the corresponding naming citations for the number range of this particular list. New namings may only be added to this list after official publication, as the preannouncement of names is condemned by the Working Group for Small Bodies Nomenclature of the International Astronomical Union.

| Near-Earth obj. | MBA (inner) | MBA (outer) | Centaur |
| Mars-crosser | MBA (middle) | Jupiter trojan | Trans-Neptunian obj. |
| Unclassified |

== 297001–297100 ==
| Designation | | | Discovery | | | Properties | | Ref |
| Permanent | Provisional | Named after | Date | Site | Discoverer(s) | Category | Diam. | Ref |
|---|---|---|---|---|---|---|---|---|
| 297001 | 2010 FW_{28} | — | March 23, 2003 | Kitt Peak | Spacewatch | (2076) | 940 m | MPC · JPL |
| 297002 | 2010 FB_{30} | — | March 17, 2010 | Kitt Peak | Spacewatch | · | 3.0 km | MPC · JPL |
| 297003 | 2010 FR_{30} | — | March 16, 2010 | Kitt Peak | Spacewatch | · | 3.3 km | MPC · JPL |
| 297004 | 2010 FP_{31} | — | March 21, 2010 | Calvin-Rehoboth | Calvin College | · | 2.4 km | MPC · JPL |
| 297005 Ellirichter | 2010 FY_{48} | Ellirichter | March 22, 2010 | ESA OGS | ESA OGS | · | 1.3 km | MPC · JPL |
| 297006 | 2010 FN_{54} | — | March 21, 2010 | Kitt Peak | Spacewatch | KOR | 1.5 km | MPC · JPL |
| 297007 | 2010 FF_{56} | — | March 20, 2010 | Kitt Peak | Spacewatch | NYS | 1.0 km | MPC · JPL |
| 297008 | 2010 FZ_{82} | — | March 18, 2010 | Mount Lemmon | Mount Lemmon Survey | · | 920 m | MPC · JPL |
| 297009 | 2010 FL_{84} | — | March 25, 2010 | Kitt Peak | Spacewatch | CYB | 5.1 km | MPC · JPL |
| 297010 | 2010 FL_{87} | — | March 18, 2010 | Mount Lemmon | Mount Lemmon Survey | · | 1.3 km | MPC · JPL |
| 297011 | 2010 FU_{88} | — | March 19, 2010 | Kitt Peak | Spacewatch | · | 2.7 km | MPC · JPL |
| 297012 | 2010 FY_{88} | — | March 25, 2010 | Kitt Peak | Spacewatch | · | 1.9 km | MPC · JPL |
| 297013 | 2010 FL_{90} | — | March 20, 2010 | Kitt Peak | Spacewatch | · | 3.3 km | MPC · JPL |
| 297014 | 2010 FV_{90} | — | March 21, 2010 | Mount Lemmon | Mount Lemmon Survey | · | 2.8 km | MPC · JPL |
| 297015 | 2010 FU_{91} | — | March 25, 2010 | Mount Lemmon | Mount Lemmon Survey | · | 2.8 km | MPC · JPL |
| 297016 | 2010 FT_{92} | — | March 17, 2010 | Catalina | CSS | · | 1.9 km | MPC · JPL |
| 297017 | 2010 GY_{5} | — | December 1, 2005 | Kitt Peak | Spacewatch | · | 1.1 km | MPC · JPL |
| 297018 | 2010 GM_{11} | — | April 2, 2010 | WISE | WISE | · | 1.6 km | MPC · JPL |
| 297019 | 2010 GN_{23} | — | April 1, 2010 | WISE | WISE | L5 | 14 km | MPC · JPL |
| 297020 | 2010 GM_{26} | — | April 4, 2010 | Kitt Peak | Spacewatch | MAS | 950 m | MPC · JPL |
| 297021 | 2010 GK_{29} | — | April 8, 2010 | Mount Lemmon | Mount Lemmon Survey | · | 1.4 km | MPC · JPL |
| 297022 | 2010 GM_{31} | — | January 26, 2001 | Kitt Peak | Spacewatch | · | 1.5 km | MPC · JPL |
| 297023 | 2010 GY_{31} | — | April 6, 2010 | Kitt Peak | Spacewatch | · | 2.4 km | MPC · JPL |
| 297024 | 2010 GB_{32} | — | April 6, 2010 | Catalina | CSS | · | 3.3 km | MPC · JPL |
| 297025 | 2010 GA_{33} | — | April 7, 2010 | Sternwarte Hagen | Klein, M. | ULA · CYB | 6.5 km | MPC · JPL |
| 297026 Corton | 2010 GJ_{33} | Corton | April 7, 2010 | Sierra Stars | M. Ory | · | 1.3 km | MPC · JPL |
| 297027 | 2010 GG_{66} | — | April 7, 2010 | Kitt Peak | Spacewatch | · | 2.4 km | MPC · JPL |
| 297028 | 2010 GH_{66} | — | April 7, 2010 | Mount Lemmon | Mount Lemmon Survey | TIR | 3.4 km | MPC · JPL |
| 297029 | 2010 GW_{96} | — | April 15, 2010 | Kachina | Hobart, J. | MAR | 1.1 km | MPC · JPL |
| 297030 | 2010 GB_{106} | — | April 7, 2010 | Kitt Peak | Spacewatch | V | 990 m | MPC · JPL |
| 297031 | 2010 GE_{106} | — | April 7, 2010 | Kitt Peak | Spacewatch | PAD | 2.6 km | MPC · JPL |
| 297032 | 2010 GJ_{106} | — | April 7, 2010 | Mount Lemmon | Mount Lemmon Survey | · | 2.0 km | MPC · JPL |
| 297033 | 2010 GG_{109} | — | April 8, 2010 | Mount Lemmon | Mount Lemmon Survey | EMA | 3.7 km | MPC · JPL |
| 297034 | 2010 GX_{113} | — | April 10, 2010 | Kitt Peak | Spacewatch | NYS | 1.2 km | MPC · JPL |
| 297035 | 2010 GV_{114} | — | April 10, 2010 | Kitt Peak | Spacewatch | · | 2.7 km | MPC · JPL |
| 297036 | 2010 GH_{124} | — | April 4, 2010 | Kitt Peak | Spacewatch | · | 1.2 km | MPC · JPL |
| 297037 | 2010 GU_{139} | — | April 7, 2010 | Mount Lemmon | Mount Lemmon Survey | NYS | 1.3 km | MPC · JPL |
| 297038 | 2010 GP_{143} | — | April 10, 2010 | Mount Lemmon | Mount Lemmon Survey | · | 2.0 km | MPC · JPL |
| 297039 | 2010 GS_{146} | — | April 8, 2010 | Catalina | CSS | · | 3.3 km | MPC · JPL |
| 297040 | 2010 GN_{158} | — | April 14, 2010 | Mount Lemmon | Mount Lemmon Survey | · | 2.3 km | MPC · JPL |
| 297041 | 2010 GZ_{158} | — | April 10, 2010 | Kitt Peak | Spacewatch | NYS | 1.4 km | MPC · JPL |
| 297042 | 2010 GX_{159} | — | April 11, 2010 | Vail-Jarnac | Jarnac | · | 2.2 km | MPC · JPL |
| 297043 | 2010 GU_{160} | — | April 11, 2010 | Mount Lemmon | Mount Lemmon Survey | · | 3.9 km | MPC · JPL |
| 297044 | 2010 HH_{13} | — | April 18, 2010 | WISE | WISE | · | 1.4 km | MPC · JPL |
| 297045 | 2010 HB_{20} | — | April 17, 2010 | Bergisch Gladbach | W. Bickel | · | 3.1 km | MPC · JPL |
| 297046 | 2010 HA_{21} | — | April 20, 2010 | Mount Lemmon | Mount Lemmon Survey | · | 4.4 km | MPC · JPL |
| 297047 | 2010 HT_{21} | — | April 15, 1996 | Kitt Peak | Spacewatch | L5 | 11 km | MPC · JPL |
| 297048 | 2010 HD_{24} | — | October 21, 2001 | Kitt Peak | Spacewatch | L5 | 13 km | MPC · JPL |
| 297049 | 2010 HS_{48} | — | April 24, 2010 | WISE | WISE | L5 | 13 km | MPC · JPL |
| 297050 | 2010 HY_{50} | — | April 24, 2010 | WISE | WISE | · | 1.4 km | MPC · JPL |
| 297051 | 2010 HA_{54} | — | April 24, 2010 | WISE | WISE | · | 2.6 km | MPC · JPL |
| 297052 | 2010 HB_{81} | — | April 28, 2010 | WISE | WISE | L5 | 17 km | MPC · JPL |
| 297053 | 2010 HG_{99} | — | April 30, 2010 | WISE | WISE | · | 2.5 km | MPC · JPL |
| 297054 | 2010 HP_{104} | — | April 20, 2010 | Mount Lemmon | Mount Lemmon Survey | · | 3.5 km | MPC · JPL |
| 297055 | 2010 HP_{107} | — | April 20, 2010 | Kitt Peak | Spacewatch | MIS | 1.7 km | MPC · JPL |
| 297056 | 2010 HA_{109} | — | April 29, 2010 | WISE | WISE | L5 | 8.1 km | MPC · JPL |
| 297057 | 2010 HU_{111} | — | December 18, 2004 | Mount Lemmon | Mount Lemmon Survey | L5 | 17 km | MPC · JPL |
| 297058 | 2010 JO | — | May 4, 2010 | Catalina | CSS | · | 6.5 km | MPC · JPL |
| 297059 | 2010 JV | — | May 1, 2010 | WISE | WISE | L5 | 17 km | MPC · JPL |
| 297060 | 2010 JF_{1} | — | May 4, 2010 | Mayhill | Mayhill | · | 2.6 km | MPC · JPL |
| 297061 | 2010 JX_{1} | — | May 3, 2010 | Kitt Peak | Spacewatch | · | 4.1 km | MPC · JPL |
| 297062 | 2010 JC_{29} | — | May 2, 2010 | Kitt Peak | Spacewatch | · | 3.9 km | MPC · JPL |
| 297063 | 2010 JD_{34} | — | August 6, 2002 | Palomar | NEAT | EUN | 1.5 km | MPC · JPL |
| 297064 | 2010 JX_{34} | — | May 4, 2010 | Siding Spring | SSS | · | 1.7 km | MPC · JPL |
| 297065 | 2010 JA_{36} | — | May 5, 2010 | Mount Lemmon | Mount Lemmon Survey | · | 3.8 km | MPC · JPL |
| 297066 | 2010 JB_{36} | — | October 23, 2003 | Kitt Peak | Spacewatch | · | 1.5 km | MPC · JPL |
| 297067 | 2010 JK_{36} | — | April 16, 2001 | Kitt Peak | Spacewatch | (12739) | 1.7 km | MPC · JPL |
| 297068 | 2010 JR_{39} | — | May 5, 2010 | Nogales | Tenagra II | · | 4.5 km | MPC · JPL |
| 297069 | 2010 JC_{72} | — | May 5, 2010 | Mount Lemmon | Mount Lemmon Survey | · | 970 m | MPC · JPL |
| 297070 | 2010 JE_{73} | — | May 6, 2010 | Mount Lemmon | Mount Lemmon Survey | AGN | 1.6 km | MPC · JPL |
| 297071 | 2010 JQ_{75} | — | May 4, 2010 | Kitt Peak | Spacewatch | · | 1.6 km | MPC · JPL |
| 297072 | 2010 JO_{86} | — | May 11, 2010 | WISE | WISE | · | 2.7 km | MPC · JPL |
| 297073 | 2010 JK_{116} | — | May 11, 2010 | Mount Lemmon | Mount Lemmon Survey | · | 3.5 km | MPC · JPL |
| 297074 | 2010 JS_{129} | — | May 13, 2010 | WISE | WISE | · | 5.1 km | MPC · JPL |
| 297075 | 2010 JD_{147} | — | May 13, 2010 | Catalina | CSS | · | 5.3 km | MPC · JPL |
| 297076 | 2010 JE_{152} | — | May 6, 2010 | Mount Lemmon | Mount Lemmon Survey | MAS | 940 m | MPC · JPL |
| 297077 | 2010 JQ_{152} | — | May 8, 2010 | Mount Lemmon | Mount Lemmon Survey | · | 2.8 km | MPC · JPL |
| 297078 | 2010 JJ_{173} | — | October 31, 2002 | Palomar | NEAT | 615 | 1.7 km | MPC · JPL |
| 297079 | 2010 JH_{176} | — | May 4, 2010 | Catalina | CSS | · | 3.7 km | MPC · JPL |
| 297080 | 2010 KV_{3} | — | May 16, 2010 | WISE | WISE | · | 2.7 km | MPC · JPL |
| 297081 | 2010 KE_{10} | — | July 5, 2005 | Mount Lemmon | Mount Lemmon Survey | · | 4.6 km | MPC · JPL |
| 297082 Bygott | 2010 KB_{21} | Bygott | May 17, 2010 | WISE | WISE | EOS | 3.1 km | MPC · JPL |
| 297083 | 2010 KA_{26} | — | May 18, 2010 | WISE | WISE | · | 3.1 km | MPC · JPL |
| 297084 | 2010 KL_{36} | — | May 18, 2010 | La Sagra | OAM | · | 3.5 km | MPC · JPL |
| 297085 | 2010 KO_{51} | — | May 22, 2010 | WISE | WISE | · | 3.1 km | MPC · JPL |
| 297086 | 2010 KY_{55} | — | May 23, 2010 | WISE | WISE | · | 3.6 km | MPC · JPL |
| 297087 | 2010 KG_{63} | — | May 23, 2010 | WISE | WISE | · | 4.5 km | MPC · JPL |
| 297088 | 2010 KM_{70} | — | May 24, 2010 | WISE | WISE | · | 3.3 km | MPC · JPL |
| 297089 | 2010 KJ_{117} | — | May 17, 2010 | La Sagra | OAM | · | 1.9 km | MPC · JPL |
| 297090 | 2010 KK_{123} | — | May 31, 2010 | WISE | WISE | · | 1.1 km | MPC · JPL |
| 297091 | 2010 LS_{111} | — | June 10, 2010 | Mount Lemmon | Mount Lemmon Survey | · | 2.9 km | MPC · JPL |
| 297092 | 2010 LB_{122} | — | June 14, 2010 | WISE | WISE | · | 2.9 km | MPC · JPL |
| 297093 | 2010 MD | — | June 16, 2010 | Sandlot | G. Hug | · | 2.6 km | MPC · JPL |
| 297094 | 2010 MH_{31} | — | December 20, 2006 | Palomar | NEAT | · | 2.2 km | MPC · JPL |
| 297095 | 2010 MB_{37} | — | August 30, 2005 | Kitt Peak | Spacewatch | · | 3.0 km | MPC · JPL |
| 297096 | 2010 MC_{41} | — | November 13, 2007 | Kitt Peak | Spacewatch | · | 1.7 km | MPC · JPL |
| 297097 | 2010 ML_{43} | — | June 22, 2010 | WISE | WISE | · | 2.4 km | MPC · JPL |
| 297098 | 2010 MA_{45} | — | May 2, 2006 | Mount Lemmon | Mount Lemmon Survey | · | 1.2 km | MPC · JPL |
| 297099 | 2010 MD_{112} | — | June 19, 2010 | Mount Lemmon | Mount Lemmon Survey | · | 960 m | MPC · JPL |
| 297100 | 2010 NR_{3} | — | July 4, 2010 | Kitt Peak | Spacewatch | NYS | 1.4 km | MPC · JPL |

== 297101–297200 ==
back to top

| Designation | | | Discovery | | | Properties | | Ref |
| Permanent | Provisional | Named after | Date | Site | Discoverer(s) | Category | Diam. | Ref |
|---|---|---|---|---|---|---|---|---|
| 297101 | 2010 NH_{58} | — | March 12, 2002 | Palomar | NEAT | · | 2.1 km | MPC · JPL |
| 297102 | 2010 OA_{29} | — | September 12, 2001 | Socorro | LINEAR | · | 2.3 km | MPC · JPL |
| 297103 | 2010 OO_{53} | — | April 18, 2009 | Kitt Peak | Spacewatch | · | 4.1 km | MPC · JPL |
| 297104 | 2010 OX_{60} | — | July 23, 2010 | WISE | WISE | · | 3.4 km | MPC · JPL |
| 297105 | 2010 OH_{91} | — | September 27, 2006 | Catalina | CSS | · | 3.8 km | MPC · JPL |
| 297106 | 2010 OH_{93} | — | October 23, 2006 | Catalina | CSS | · | 1.7 km | MPC · JPL |
| 297107 | 2010 OY_{94} | — | July 28, 2010 | WISE | WISE | · | 5.5 km | MPC · JPL |
| 297108 | 2010 OM_{96} | — | September 6, 2004 | Siding Spring | SSS | · | 4.0 km | MPC · JPL |
| 297109 | 2010 OT_{99} | — | October 12, 1999 | Kitt Peak | Spacewatch | · | 2.8 km | MPC · JPL |
| 297110 | 2010 PM_{48} | — | December 2, 2005 | Kitt Peak | Spacewatch | · | 4.2 km | MPC · JPL |
| 297111 | 2010 PY_{65} | — | June 19, 2007 | Kitt Peak | Spacewatch | L4 | 20 km | MPC · JPL |
| 297112 | 2010 PS_{74} | — | August 11, 2010 | La Sagra | OAM | · | 830 m | MPC · JPL |
| 297113 | 2010 PP_{76} | — | August 10, 2010 | Kitt Peak | Spacewatch | · | 1.3 km | MPC · JPL |
| 297114 | 2010 RU_{43} | — | September 28, 2003 | Kitt Peak | Spacewatch | · | 1.1 km | MPC · JPL |
| 297115 | 2010 RX_{47} | — | August 31, 2000 | Kitt Peak | Spacewatch | KOR | 1.3 km | MPC · JPL |
| 297116 | 2010 RB_{72} | — | September 9, 1977 | Palomar | C. J. van Houten, I. van Houten-Groeneveld, T. Gehrels | NYS | 1.2 km | MPC · JPL |
| 297117 | 2010 RY_{108} | — | September 12, 2001 | Socorro | LINEAR | · | 2.1 km | MPC · JPL |
| 297118 | 2010 RY_{116} | — | October 26, 2005 | Kitt Peak | Spacewatch | · | 2.0 km | MPC · JPL |
| 297119 | 2010 RZ_{118} | — | October 29, 2006 | Mount Lemmon | Mount Lemmon Survey | · | 2.6 km | MPC · JPL |
| 297120 | 2010 RO_{125} | — | April 1, 2008 | Mount Lemmon | Mount Lemmon Survey | KOR | 1.7 km | MPC · JPL |
| 297121 | 2010 RB_{126} | — | May 9, 2002 | Palomar | NEAT | · | 1.4 km | MPC · JPL |
| 297122 | 2010 RS_{126} | — | December 11, 2001 | Socorro | LINEAR | · | 2.2 km | MPC · JPL |
| 297123 | 2010 RM_{136} | — | August 30, 2006 | Anderson Mesa | LONEOS | V | 1.0 km | MPC · JPL |
| 297124 | 2010 RM_{152} | — | November 1, 2007 | Kitt Peak | Spacewatch | · | 1.1 km | MPC · JPL |
| 297125 | 2010 RV_{166} | — | December 20, 2004 | Mount Lemmon | Mount Lemmon Survey | · | 950 m | MPC · JPL |
| 297126 | 2010 RC_{174} | — | April 28, 2004 | Kitt Peak | Spacewatch | · | 2.5 km | MPC · JPL |
| 297127 | 2010 RD_{179} | — | November 18, 1995 | Kitt Peak | Spacewatch | · | 1.4 km | MPC · JPL |
| 297128 | 2010 SY_{2} | — | September 27, 1994 | Kitt Peak | Spacewatch | · | 2.2 km | MPC · JPL |
| 297129 | 2010 SL_{11} | — | October 1, 1999 | Kitt Peak | Spacewatch | V | 770 m | MPC · JPL |
| 297130 | 2010 SN_{20} | — | August 31, 2005 | Kitt Peak | Spacewatch | KOR | 1.7 km | MPC · JPL |
| 297131 | 2010 ST_{33} | — | November 19, 2000 | Kitt Peak | Spacewatch | · | 940 m | MPC · JPL |
| 297132 | 2010 TJ_{2} | — | September 24, 1960 | Palomar | C. J. van Houten, I. van Houten-Groeneveld, T. Gehrels | · | 1.5 km | MPC · JPL |
| 297133 | 2010 TU_{27} | — | June 4, 2005 | Kitt Peak | Spacewatch | EUN | 1.2 km | MPC · JPL |
| 297134 | 2010 TK_{37} | — | September 19, 2003 | Kitt Peak | Spacewatch | (2076) | 750 m | MPC · JPL |
| 297135 | 2010 TD_{38} | — | January 31, 2004 | Kitt Peak | Spacewatch | · | 1.5 km | MPC · JPL |
| 297136 | 2010 TH_{38} | — | November 13, 2006 | Catalina | CSS | EUN | 1.5 km | MPC · JPL |
| 297137 | 2010 TS_{38} | — | December 29, 2003 | Kitt Peak | Spacewatch | MAS | 840 m | MPC · JPL |
| 297138 | 2010 TB_{79} | — | November 20, 2000 | Socorro | LINEAR | V | 780 m | MPC · JPL |
| 297139 | 2010 TK_{90} | — | September 30, 2006 | Mount Lemmon | Mount Lemmon Survey | MAS | 740 m | MPC · JPL |
| 297140 | 2010 TY_{127} | — | September 10, 2004 | Kitt Peak | Spacewatch | THM | 2.7 km | MPC · JPL |
| 297141 | 2010 TU_{145} | — | September 25, 2001 | Socorro | LINEAR | · | 2.0 km | MPC · JPL |
| 297142 | 2010 TZ_{163} | — | December 14, 2003 | Kitt Peak | Spacewatch | · | 1.5 km | MPC · JPL |
| 297143 | 2010 TV_{173} | — | March 21, 1999 | Apache Point | SDSS | · | 920 m | MPC · JPL |
| 297144 | 2010 TM_{177} | — | December 2, 1999 | Kitt Peak | Spacewatch | L4 | 10 km | MPC · JPL |
| 297145 | 2010 TN_{177} | — | September 12, 2006 | Catalina | CSS | MAS | 1 km | MPC · JPL |
| 297146 | 2010 UF | — | February 3, 2009 | Siding Spring | SSS | H | 970 m | MPC · JPL |
| 297147 | 2010 UB_{6} | — | April 7, 2003 | Kitt Peak | Spacewatch | L4 | 10 km | MPC · JPL |
| 297148 | 2010 UD_{11} | — | March 4, 1995 | Kitt Peak | Spacewatch | HYG | 5.0 km | MPC · JPL |
| 297149 | 2010 UR_{26} | — | September 30, 2005 | Palomar | NEAT | WIT | 1.3 km | MPC · JPL |
| 297150 | 2010 UN_{27} | — | January 28, 2003 | Kitt Peak | Spacewatch | (5) | 1.3 km | MPC · JPL |
| 297151 | 2010 UW_{34} | — | August 10, 1997 | Kitt Peak | Spacewatch | · | 1.9 km | MPC · JPL |
| 297152 | 2010 UQ_{56} | — | February 14, 2002 | Cerro Tololo | Deep Lens Survey | · | 2.4 km | MPC · JPL |
| 297153 | 2010 UU_{59} | — | December 17, 2001 | Socorro | LINEAR | WIT | 1.5 km | MPC · JPL |
| 297154 | 2010 UE_{60} | — | January 10, 2003 | Bergisch Gladbach | W. Bickel | (5) | 1.9 km | MPC · JPL |
| 297155 | 2010 UV_{66} | — | December 20, 2009 | Mount Lemmon | Mount Lemmon Survey | L4 | 10 km | MPC · JPL |
| 297156 | 2010 UC_{81} | — | December 14, 2006 | Kitt Peak | Spacewatch | · | 1.6 km | MPC · JPL |
| 297157 | 2010 UE_{81} | — | August 28, 2006 | Kitt Peak | Spacewatch | · | 1.3 km | MPC · JPL |
| 297158 | 2010 UW_{99} | — | September 30, 2009 | Mount Lemmon | Mount Lemmon Survey | L4 | 10 km | MPC · JPL |
| 297159 | 2010 VN_{13} | — | November 1, 2000 | Socorro | LINEAR | · | 950 m | MPC · JPL |
| 297160 | 2010 VG_{22} | — | June 21, 2007 | Kitt Peak | Spacewatch | L4 | 8.4 km | MPC · JPL |
| 297161 Subuchin | 2010 VU_{26} | Subuchin | February 29, 2008 | XuYi | PMO NEO Survey Program | V | 800 m | MPC · JPL |
| 297162 | 2010 VY_{27} | — | November 19, 2003 | Palomar | NEAT | · | 1.1 km | MPC · JPL |
| 297163 | 2010 VT_{36} | — | June 10, 2005 | Kitt Peak | Spacewatch | L4 | 13 km | MPC · JPL |
| 297164 | 2010 VA_{37} | — | January 8, 2007 | Catalina | CSS | · | 2.5 km | MPC · JPL |
| 297165 | 2010 VF_{57} | — | May 7, 2006 | Kitt Peak | Spacewatch | · | 850 m | MPC · JPL |
| 297166 | 2010 VY_{57} | — | October 15, 1995 | Kitt Peak | Spacewatch | NYS | 1.1 km | MPC · JPL |
| 297167 | 2010 VS_{81} | — | August 25, 2001 | Anderson Mesa | LONEOS | · | 1.6 km | MPC · JPL |
| 297168 | 2010 VW_{81} | — | November 21, 2009 | Catalina | CSS | L4 | 10 km | MPC · JPL |
| 297169 | 2010 VK_{99} | — | September 2, 2000 | Socorro | LINEAR | · | 930 m | MPC · JPL |
| 297170 | 2010 VE_{103} | — | April 1, 2008 | Kitt Peak | Spacewatch | · | 2.6 km | MPC · JPL |
| 297171 | 2010 VD_{112} | — | July 18, 2004 | Campo Imperatore | CINEOS | · | 2.0 km | MPC · JPL |
| 297172 | 2010 VU_{112} | — | December 5, 1996 | Kitt Peak | Spacewatch | V | 550 m | MPC · JPL |
| 297173 | 2010 VC_{113} | — | August 21, 2004 | Siding Spring | SSS | · | 3.0 km | MPC · JPL |
| 297174 | 2010 VB_{136} | — | September 29, 2009 | Mount Lemmon | Mount Lemmon Survey | L4 | 10 km | MPC · JPL |
| 297175 | 2010 VF_{169} | — | December 30, 2005 | Mount Lemmon | Mount Lemmon Survey | · | 4.0 km | MPC · JPL |
| 297176 | 2010 VX_{171} | — | December 31, 2002 | Socorro | LINEAR | · | 1.7 km | MPC · JPL |
| 297177 | 2010 VC_{187} | — | August 21, 2004 | Siding Spring | SSS | · | 3.2 km | MPC · JPL |
| 297178 | 2010 WF_{24} | — | January 16, 2009 | Mount Lemmon | Mount Lemmon Survey | L4 | 12 km | MPC · JPL |
| 297179 | 2010 WB_{34} | — | March 18, 2007 | Kitt Peak | Spacewatch | · | 3.0 km | MPC · JPL |
| 297180 | 2010 WM_{38} | — | September 19, 2003 | Anderson Mesa | LONEOS | · | 830 m | MPC · JPL |
| 297181 | 2010 WJ_{47} | — | October 1, 2005 | Kitt Peak | Spacewatch | HOF | 2.7 km | MPC · JPL |
| 297182 | 2010 WD_{49} | — | December 17, 1998 | Kitt Peak | Spacewatch | L4 | 9.4 km | MPC · JPL |
| 297183 | 2010 WL_{53} | — | September 8, 1999 | Socorro | LINEAR | ERI | 1.5 km | MPC · JPL |
| 297184 | 2010 WS_{55} | — | January 26, 2006 | Catalina | CSS | EOS | 2.4 km | MPC · JPL |
| 297185 | 2010 WO_{69} | — | December 2, 2005 | Kitt Peak | Spacewatch | · | 2.7 km | MPC · JPL |
| 297186 | 2010 XD_{3} | — | December 19, 2003 | Socorro | LINEAR | · | 1.4 km | MPC · JPL |
| 297187 | 2010 XN_{17} | — | January 31, 2004 | Kitt Peak | Spacewatch | · | 1.3 km | MPC · JPL |
| 297188 | 2010 XS_{35} | — | March 26, 2007 | Mount Lemmon | Mount Lemmon Survey | · | 1.8 km | MPC · JPL |
| 297189 | 2010 XZ_{35} | — | April 12, 2002 | Palomar | NEAT | · | 4.6 km | MPC · JPL |
| 297190 | 2010 XM_{38} | — | February 22, 2006 | Catalina | CSS | · | 4.2 km | MPC · JPL |
| 297191 | 2010 XZ_{41} | — | March 17, 2004 | Kitt Peak | Spacewatch | · | 1.3 km | MPC · JPL |
| 297192 | 2010 XO_{63} | — | February 24, 2006 | Anderson Mesa | LONEOS | · | 4.5 km | MPC · JPL |
| 297193 | 2010 XZ_{66} | — | July 3, 2005 | Palomar | NEAT | · | 1.6 km | MPC · JPL |
| 297194 | 2010 XX_{68} | — | July 26, 2006 | Siding Spring | SSS | L4 | 10 km | MPC · JPL |
| 297195 | 2010 XS_{76} | — | July 18, 2007 | Mount Lemmon | Mount Lemmon Survey | L4 | 9.1 km | MPC · JPL |
| 297196 | 2011 AY_{26} | — | October 27, 2009 | Mount Lemmon | Mount Lemmon Survey | L4 | 9.6 km | MPC · JPL |
| 297197 | 2011 AE_{30} | — | September 26, 2005 | Kitt Peak | Spacewatch | · | 1.5 km | MPC · JPL |
| 297198 | 2011 AB_{34} | — | February 7, 2000 | Kitt Peak | Spacewatch | · | 2.7 km | MPC · JPL |
| 297199 | 2011 AS_{56} | — | January 13, 2002 | Socorro | LINEAR | · | 2.0 km | MPC · JPL |
| 297200 | 2011 BS_{99} | — | May 14, 2001 | Kitt Peak | Spacewatch | EOS | 2.4 km | MPC · JPL |

== 297201–297300 ==
back to top

| Designation | | | Discovery | | | Properties | | Ref |
| Permanent | Provisional | Named after | Date | Site | Discoverer(s) | Category | Diam. | Ref |
|---|---|---|---|---|---|---|---|---|
| 297201 | 2011 BH_{100} | — | April 19, 2007 | Mount Lemmon | Mount Lemmon Survey | DOR | 2.6 km | MPC · JPL |
| 297202 | 2011 BZ_{112} | — | March 24, 2003 | Kitt Peak | Spacewatch | · | 1.6 km | MPC · JPL |
| 297203 | 2011 CM_{88} | — | September 7, 2008 | Mount Lemmon | Mount Lemmon Survey | · | 4.4 km | MPC · JPL |
| 297204 | 2011 CF_{89} | — | October 30, 2009 | Mount Lemmon | Mount Lemmon Survey | · | 2.9 km | MPC · JPL |
| 297205 | 2011 DT_{7} | — | October 10, 2002 | Apache Point | SDSS | · | 4.1 km | MPC · JPL |
| 297206 | 2011 DW_{11} | — | September 29, 2005 | Kitt Peak | Spacewatch | · | 780 m | MPC · JPL |
| 297207 | 2011 DG_{48} | — | January 23, 2006 | Catalina | CSS | BRA | 1.9 km | MPC · JPL |
| 297208 | 2011 DL_{49} | — | August 22, 2002 | Palomar | NEAT | · | 1.2 km | MPC · JPL |
| 297209 | 2011 FA_{102} | — | March 15, 2004 | Kitt Peak | Spacewatch | · | 1.7 km | MPC · JPL |
| 297210 | 2011 FL_{141} | — | August 22, 1995 | Kitt Peak | Spacewatch | · | 750 m | MPC · JPL |
| 297211 | 2011 HA_{32} | — | September 19, 1998 | Apache Point | SDSS | BRA | 1.6 km | MPC · JPL |
| 297212 | 2011 HJ_{52} | — | January 23, 2006 | Kitt Peak | Spacewatch | · | 1.9 km | MPC · JPL |
| 297213 | 2011 HG_{59} | — | October 19, 2003 | Apache Point | SDSS | · | 2.4 km | MPC · JPL |
| 297214 | 2011 HS_{59} | — | February 17, 2007 | Kitt Peak | Spacewatch | · | 1.4 km | MPC · JPL |
| 297215 | 2011 JJ | — | April 30, 2008 | Mount Lemmon | Mount Lemmon Survey | L5 | 10 km | MPC · JPL |
| 297216 | 2011 KK_{6} | — | March 11, 2005 | Kitt Peak | Spacewatch | THM | 2.8 km | MPC · JPL |
| 297217 | 2011 KX_{9} | — | January 30, 2006 | Kitt Peak | Spacewatch | · | 1.6 km | MPC · JPL |
| 297218 | 2011 KT_{16} | — | April 20, 2010 | WISE | WISE | L5 | 10 km | MPC · JPL |
| 297219 | 2011 KW_{21} | — | March 18, 1996 | Kitt Peak | Spacewatch | · | 2.7 km | MPC · JPL |
| 297220 | 2011 LZ_{4} | — | October 18, 2003 | Socorro | LINEAR | · | 2.4 km | MPC · JPL |
| 297221 | 2011 OF_{18} | — | November 20, 2001 | Kitt Peak | Spacewatch | L5 | 8.8 km | MPC · JPL |
| 297222 | 2011 OM_{19} | — | March 9, 2005 | Kitt Peak | Spacewatch | · | 2.6 km | MPC · JPL |
| 297223 | 2011 OS_{19} | — | November 8, 2008 | Kitt Peak | Spacewatch | · | 1.3 km | MPC · JPL |
| 297224 | 2011 OK_{31} | — | October 6, 2004 | Kitt Peak | Spacewatch | · | 1.5 km | MPC · JPL |
| 297225 | 2011 PG | — | April 25, 2003 | Kitt Peak | Spacewatch | NYS | 1.3 km | MPC · JPL |
| 297226 | 4219 P-L | — | September 24, 1960 | Palomar | C. J. van Houten, I. van Houten-Groeneveld, T. Gehrels | · | 2.8 km | MPC · JPL |
| 297227 | 3473 T-2 | — | September 25, 1973 | Palomar | C. J. van Houten, I. van Houten-Groeneveld, T. Gehrels | · | 1.1 km | MPC · JPL |
| 297228 | 1012 T-3 | — | October 17, 1977 | Palomar | C. J. van Houten, I. van Houten-Groeneveld, T. Gehrels | · | 4.7 km | MPC · JPL |
| 297229 | 2126 T-3 | — | October 16, 1977 | Palomar | C. J. van Houten, I. van Houten-Groeneveld, T. Gehrels | · | 1.9 km | MPC · JPL |
| 297230 | 2205 T-3 | — | October 16, 1977 | Palomar | C. J. van Houten, I. van Houten-Groeneveld, T. Gehrels | · | 1.3 km | MPC · JPL |
| 297231 | 2320 T-3 | — | October 16, 1977 | Palomar | C. J. van Houten, I. van Houten-Groeneveld, T. Gehrels | · | 2.6 km | MPC · JPL |
| 297232 | 3388 T-3 | — | October 16, 1977 | Palomar | C. J. van Houten, I. van Houten-Groeneveld, T. Gehrels | PHO | 860 m | MPC · JPL |
| 297233 | 5100 T-3 | — | October 16, 1977 | Palomar | C. J. van Houten, I. van Houten-Groeneveld, T. Gehrels | · | 3.0 km | MPC · JPL |
| 297234 | 1960 SP | — | September 24, 1960 | Palomar | L. D. Schmadel, Stoss, R. | NYS | 930 m | MPC · JPL |
| 297235 | 1981 EN_{11} | — | March 7, 1981 | Siding Spring | S. J. Bus | · | 1.0 km | MPC · JPL |
| 297236 | 1981 EB_{29} | — | March 1, 1981 | Siding Spring | S. J. Bus | · | 2.1 km | MPC · JPL |
| 297237 | 1981 EA_{48} | — | March 3, 1981 | Siding Spring | S. J. Bus | · | 2.4 km | MPC · JPL |
| 297238 | 1994 JY_{3} | — | May 3, 1994 | Kitt Peak | Spacewatch | · | 2.1 km | MPC · JPL |
| 297239 | 1994 RH_{19} | — | September 5, 1994 | La Silla | E. W. Elst | · | 2.2 km | MPC · JPL |
| 297240 | 1994 SC_{1} | — | September 27, 1994 | Kitt Peak | Spacewatch | · | 1.7 km | MPC · JPL |
| 297241 | 1994 SF_{5} | — | September 28, 1994 | Kitt Peak | Spacewatch | · | 2.1 km | MPC · JPL |
| 297242 | 1994 SL_{11} | — | September 29, 1994 | Kitt Peak | Spacewatch | · | 3.1 km | MPC · JPL |
| 297243 | 1994 SC_{13} | — | September 30, 1994 | Kitt Peak | Spacewatch | TIR | 3.4 km | MPC · JPL |
| 297244 | 1994 UW_{1} | — | October 29, 1994 | Siding Spring | R. H. McNaught | · | 2.6 km | MPC · JPL |
| 297245 | 1994 UP_{6} | — | October 28, 1994 | Kitt Peak | Spacewatch | · | 860 m | MPC · JPL |
| 297246 | 1994 UW_{7} | — | October 28, 1994 | Kitt Peak | Spacewatch | · | 4.5 km | MPC · JPL |
| 297247 | 1994 UZ_{10} | — | October 29, 1994 | Kitt Peak | Spacewatch | · | 1.7 km | MPC · JPL |
| 297248 | 1995 AF_{2} | — | January 8, 1995 | Kitt Peak | Spacewatch | NEM | 2.1 km | MPC · JPL |
| 297249 | 1995 DQ_{2} | — | February 25, 1995 | Siding Spring | R. H. McNaught | · | 3.0 km | MPC · JPL |
| 297250 | 1995 EC_{4} | — | March 2, 1995 | Kitt Peak | Spacewatch | · | 1.3 km | MPC · JPL |
| 297251 | 1995 FN_{10} | — | March 26, 1995 | Kitt Peak | Spacewatch | · | 1.5 km | MPC · JPL |
| 297252 | 1995 GS_{2} | — | April 2, 1995 | Kitt Peak | Spacewatch | NYS | 1.4 km | MPC · JPL |
| 297253 | 1995 QN_{14} | — | August 27, 1995 | Kitt Peak | Spacewatch | EOS | 2.4 km | MPC · JPL |
| 297254 | 1995 SR_{10} | — | September 17, 1995 | Kitt Peak | Spacewatch | · | 2.9 km | MPC · JPL |
| 297255 | 1995 SN_{51} | — | September 26, 1995 | Kitt Peak | Spacewatch | EMA | 4.2 km | MPC · JPL |
| 297256 | 1995 SA_{52} | — | September 26, 1995 | Kitt Peak | Spacewatch | · | 4.6 km | MPC · JPL |
| 297257 | 1995 SC_{59} | — | September 24, 1995 | Kitt Peak | Spacewatch | · | 2.3 km | MPC · JPL |
| 297258 | 1995 SZ_{64} | — | September 19, 1995 | Kitt Peak | Spacewatch | · | 2.9 km | MPC · JPL |
| 297259 | 1995 SA_{66} | — | September 17, 1995 | Kitt Peak | Spacewatch | EOS | 2.3 km | MPC · JPL |
| 297260 | 1995 SO_{68} | — | September 20, 1995 | Kitt Peak | Spacewatch | · | 1.9 km | MPC · JPL |
| 297261 | 1995 SB_{80} | — | September 21, 1995 | Kitt Peak | Spacewatch | EOS | 1.8 km | MPC · JPL |
| 297262 | 1995 TV_{3} | — | October 15, 1995 | Kitt Peak | Spacewatch | · | 820 m | MPC · JPL |
| 297263 | 1995 TG_{4} | — | October 15, 1995 | Kitt Peak | Spacewatch | · | 720 m | MPC · JPL |
| 297264 | 1995 TH_{6} | — | October 15, 1995 | Kitt Peak | Spacewatch | · | 4.1 km | MPC · JPL |
| 297265 | 1995 UT_{12} | — | October 17, 1995 | Kitt Peak | Spacewatch | (5) | 1.1 km | MPC · JPL |
| 297266 | 1995 UP_{15} | — | October 17, 1995 | Kitt Peak | Spacewatch | EOS | 2.6 km | MPC · JPL |
| 297267 | 1995 UR_{20} | — | October 19, 1995 | Kitt Peak | Spacewatch | · | 1.1 km | MPC · JPL |
| 297268 | 1995 VJ_{15} | — | November 15, 1995 | Kitt Peak | Spacewatch | · | 4.9 km | MPC · JPL |
| 297269 | 1995 VF_{18} | — | November 15, 1995 | Kitt Peak | Spacewatch | · | 860 m | MPC · JPL |
| 297270 | 1995 WB_{18} | — | November 17, 1995 | Kitt Peak | Spacewatch | · | 1.0 km | MPC · JPL |
| 297271 | 1995 WH_{18} | — | November 17, 1995 | Kitt Peak | Spacewatch | · | 3.9 km | MPC · JPL |
| 297272 | 1996 BV_{9} | — | January 21, 1996 | Kitt Peak | Spacewatch | · | 1.8 km | MPC · JPL |
| 297273 | 1996 FU_{5} | — | March 17, 1996 | Kitt Peak | Spacewatch | (5) | 1.5 km | MPC · JPL |
| 297274 | 1996 SK | — | September 17, 1996 | Haleakala | NEAT | T_{j} (2.97) · APO +1km · PHA | 1.2 km | MPC · JPL |
| 297275 | 1996 TX_{29} | — | October 7, 1996 | Kitt Peak | Spacewatch | · | 1.5 km | MPC · JPL |
| 297276 | 1996 VR_{11} | — | November 4, 1996 | Kitt Peak | Spacewatch | · | 2.2 km | MPC · JPL |
| 297277 | 1996 VT_{15} | — | November 5, 1996 | Kitt Peak | Spacewatch | · | 2.5 km | MPC · JPL |
| 297278 | 1996 XB_{16} | — | December 4, 1996 | Kitt Peak | Spacewatch | · | 1.0 km | MPC · JPL |
| 297279 | 1997 CT_{11} | — | February 3, 1997 | Kitt Peak | Spacewatch | · | 1.4 km | MPC · JPL |
| 297280 | 1997 GG_{1} | — | April 2, 1997 | Kitt Peak | Spacewatch | · | 2.3 km | MPC · JPL |
| 297281 | 1997 GJ_{30} | — | April 7, 1997 | Kitt Peak | Spacewatch | · | 760 m | MPC · JPL |
| 297282 | 1997 HV_{1} | — | April 28, 1997 | Kitt Peak | Spacewatch | · | 2.2 km | MPC · JPL |
| 297283 | 1997 NK | — | July 1, 1997 | Kitt Peak | Spacewatch | · | 1.7 km | MPC · JPL |
| 297284 | 1997 NT_{5} | — | July 7, 1997 | Kitt Peak | Spacewatch | · | 800 m | MPC · JPL |
| 297285 | 1997 SO_{6} | — | September 23, 1997 | Kitt Peak | Spacewatch | · | 780 m | MPC · JPL |
| 297286 | 1997 SQ_{8} | — | September 27, 1997 | Kitt Peak | Spacewatch | (2076) | 1.1 km | MPC · JPL |
| 297287 | 1997 SC_{33} | — | September 29, 1997 | Kitt Peak | Spacewatch | L4 | 8.6 km | MPC · JPL |
| 297288 | 1997 TT_{1} | — | October 3, 1997 | Caussols | ODAS | · | 2.1 km | MPC · JPL |
| 297289 | 1997 WF | — | November 18, 1997 | Oizumi | T. Kobayashi | · | 1.1 km | MPC · JPL |
| 297290 | 1997 WU_{18} | — | November 23, 1997 | Kitt Peak | Spacewatch | MAS | 730 m | MPC · JPL |
| 297291 | 1997 XG_{2} | — | December 3, 1997 | Chichibu | N. Satō | · | 1.4 km | MPC · JPL |
| 297292 | 1998 FW_{105} | — | March 31, 1998 | Socorro | LINEAR | · | 4.7 km | MPC · JPL |
| 297293 | 1998 HN_{12} | — | April 19, 1998 | Kitt Peak | Spacewatch | (194) | 1.4 km | MPC · JPL |
| 297294 | 1998 ML_{7} | — | June 21, 1998 | Kitt Peak | Spacewatch | · | 1.9 km | MPC · JPL |
| 297295 | 1998 QN_{3} | — | August 17, 1998 | Socorro | LINEAR | · | 3.9 km | MPC · JPL |
| 297296 | 1998 QQ_{73} | — | August 24, 1998 | Socorro | LINEAR | JUN | 1.7 km | MPC · JPL |
| 297297 | 1998 RQ_{13} | — | September 13, 1998 | Kitt Peak | Spacewatch | · | 2.0 km | MPC · JPL |
| 297298 | 1998 RF_{22} | — | September 14, 1998 | Socorro | LINEAR | · | 2.6 km | MPC · JPL |
| 297299 | 1998 RM_{62} | — | September 14, 1998 | Socorro | LINEAR | · | 1.0 km | MPC · JPL |
| 297300 | 1998 SC_{15} | — | September 23, 1998 | Socorro | LINEAR | APO · PHA | 320 m | MPC · JPL |

== 297301–297400 ==
back to top

| Designation | | | Discovery | | | Properties | | Ref |
| Permanent | Provisional | Named after | Date | Site | Discoverer(s) | Category | Diam. | Ref |
|---|---|---|---|---|---|---|---|---|
| 297301 | 1998 SQ_{20} | — | September 21, 1998 | Kitt Peak | Spacewatch | · | 1.6 km | MPC · JPL |
| 297302 | 1998 SB_{38} | — | September 23, 1998 | Kitt Peak | Spacewatch | · | 1.5 km | MPC · JPL |
| 297303 | 1998 SK_{86} | — | September 26, 1998 | Socorro | LINEAR | · | 870 m | MPC · JPL |
| 297304 | 1998 SQ_{125} | — | September 26, 1998 | Socorro | LINEAR | · | 1.6 km | MPC · JPL |
| 297305 | 1998 TT_{8} | — | October 12, 1998 | Kitt Peak | Spacewatch | · | 1.8 km | MPC · JPL |
| 297306 | 1998 TR_{10} | — | October 12, 1998 | Kitt Peak | Spacewatch | · | 2.1 km | MPC · JPL |
| 297307 | 1998 TQ_{20} | — | October 13, 1998 | Kitt Peak | Spacewatch | · | 1.4 km | MPC · JPL |
| 297308 | 1998 TH_{21} | — | October 13, 1998 | Kitt Peak | Spacewatch | · | 1.7 km | MPC · JPL |
| 297309 | 1998 UJ_{18} | — | October 20, 1998 | Xinglong | SCAP | · | 1.0 km | MPC · JPL |
| 297310 | 1998 UK_{28} | — | October 18, 1998 | La Silla | E. W. Elst | · | 2.2 km | MPC · JPL |
| 297311 | 1998 VR_{4} | — | November 11, 1998 | Caussols | ODAS | · | 2.4 km | MPC · JPL |
| 297312 | 1998 WW_{3} | — | November 18, 1998 | Socorro | LINEAR | JUN | 1.3 km | MPC · JPL |
| 297313 | 1998 WF_{42} | — | November 19, 1998 | Caussols | ODAS | · | 640 m | MPC · JPL |
| 297314 Ilterracottaio | 1998 XV_{2} | Ilterracottaio | December 7, 1998 | San Marcello | M. Tombelli, A. Boattini | · | 680 m | MPC · JPL |
| 297315 | 1999 BV_{31} | — | January 19, 1999 | Kitt Peak | Spacewatch | · | 2.7 km | MPC · JPL |
| 297316 | 1999 HV_{7} | — | April 19, 1999 | Kitt Peak | Spacewatch | · | 1.2 km | MPC · JPL |
| 297317 | 1999 HH_{10} | — | April 17, 1999 | Socorro | LINEAR | · | 1.8 km | MPC · JPL |
| 297318 | 1999 TV_{4} | — | October 4, 1999 | Socorro | LINEAR | · | 910 m | MPC · JPL |
| 297319 | 1999 TR_{39} | — | October 3, 1999 | Catalina | CSS | · | 1.7 km | MPC · JPL |
| 297320 | 1999 TV_{163} | — | October 9, 1999 | Socorro | LINEAR | · | 1.8 km | MPC · JPL |
| 297321 | 1999 TU_{178} | — | October 10, 1999 | Socorro | LINEAR | · | 1.1 km | MPC · JPL |
| 297322 | 1999 TB_{180} | — | October 10, 1999 | Socorro | LINEAR | · | 1.2 km | MPC · JPL |
| 297323 | 1999 TE_{211} | — | October 15, 1999 | Socorro | LINEAR | · | 960 m | MPC · JPL |
| 297324 | 1999 TU_{213} | — | October 15, 1999 | Socorro | LINEAR | · | 1.0 km | MPC · JPL |
| 297325 | 1999 TX_{217} | — | October 15, 1999 | Socorro | LINEAR | · | 970 m | MPC · JPL |
| 297326 | 1999 TP_{246} | — | October 6, 1999 | Socorro | LINEAR | · | 4.4 km | MPC · JPL |
| 297327 | 1999 TQ_{290} | — | October 10, 1999 | Socorro | LINEAR | · | 1.4 km | MPC · JPL |
| 297328 | 1999 US_{35} | — | October 30, 1999 | Kitt Peak | Spacewatch | EUN | 1.3 km | MPC · JPL |
| 297329 | 1999 VY_{26} | — | November 3, 1999 | Socorro | LINEAR | · | 1.2 km | MPC · JPL |
| 297330 | 1999 VW_{99} | — | November 9, 1999 | Socorro | LINEAR | · | 1.7 km | MPC · JPL |
| 297331 | 1999 VZ_{132} | — | November 10, 1999 | Kitt Peak | Spacewatch | · | 1.7 km | MPC · JPL |
| 297332 | 1999 VH_{147} | — | November 12, 1999 | Socorro | LINEAR | · | 2.6 km | MPC · JPL |
| 297333 | 1999 VE_{168} | — | November 14, 1999 | Socorro | LINEAR | · | 1.2 km | MPC · JPL |
| 297334 | 1999 VN_{175} | — | November 11, 1999 | Kitt Peak | Spacewatch | (5) | 1.1 km | MPC · JPL |
| 297335 | 1999 VH_{190} | — | November 15, 1999 | Socorro | LINEAR | EUN | 1.7 km | MPC · JPL |
| 297336 | 1999 VR_{206} | — | November 9, 1999 | Kitt Peak | Spacewatch | · | 770 m | MPC · JPL |
| 297337 | 1999 WH_{13} | — | November 30, 1999 | Kitt Peak | Spacewatch | · | 1.9 km | MPC · JPL |
| 297338 | 1999 WR_{15} | — | November 29, 1999 | Kitt Peak | Spacewatch | (5) | 910 m | MPC · JPL |
| 297339 | 1999 WY_{25} | — | November 29, 1999 | Kitt Peak | Spacewatch | (5) | 1.0 km | MPC · JPL |
| 297340 | 1999 XY_{39} | — | December 6, 1999 | Socorro | LINEAR | · | 1.7 km | MPC · JPL |
| 297341 | 1999 XR_{102} | — | December 7, 1999 | Socorro | LINEAR | · | 2.3 km | MPC · JPL |
| 297342 | 1999 XM_{103} | — | December 7, 1999 | Socorro | LINEAR | · | 3.1 km | MPC · JPL |
| 297343 | 1999 XU_{140} | — | December 2, 1999 | Kitt Peak | Spacewatch | (5) | 1.4 km | MPC · JPL |
| 297344 | 1999 XK_{146} | — | December 7, 1999 | Kitt Peak | Spacewatch | · | 1.2 km | MPC · JPL |
| 297345 | 1999 XY_{151} | — | December 7, 1999 | Kitt Peak | Spacewatch | · | 1.6 km | MPC · JPL |
| 297346 | 1999 XP_{179} | — | December 10, 1999 | Socorro | LINEAR | · | 1.8 km | MPC · JPL |
| 297347 | 1999 XK_{196} | — | December 12, 1999 | Socorro | LINEAR | · | 2.5 km | MPC · JPL |
| 297348 | 1999 XR_{244} | — | December 4, 1999 | Kitt Peak | Spacewatch | · | 1.5 km | MPC · JPL |
| 297349 | 1999 XR_{245} | — | December 5, 1999 | Socorro | LINEAR | · | 2.2 km | MPC · JPL |
| 297350 | 1999 YX_{12} | — | December 31, 1999 | Kitt Peak | Spacewatch | · | 2.2 km | MPC · JPL |
| 297351 | 1999 YP_{16} | — | December 31, 1999 | Kitt Peak | Spacewatch | · | 1.2 km | MPC · JPL |
| 297352 | 2000 AO_{19} | — | January 3, 2000 | Socorro | LINEAR | · | 1.8 km | MPC · JPL |
| 297353 | 2000 AV_{24} | — | January 3, 2000 | Socorro | LINEAR | EUN | 1.6 km | MPC · JPL |
| 297354 | 2000 AB_{147} | — | January 7, 2000 | Eskridge | Farpoint | (5) | 1.7 km | MPC · JPL |
| 297355 | 2000 BM_{2} | — | January 25, 2000 | Socorro | LINEAR | · | 2.4 km | MPC · JPL |
| 297356 | 2000 BG_{46} | — | January 28, 2000 | Kitt Peak | Spacewatch | · | 2.3 km | MPC · JPL |
| 297357 | 2000 BQ_{48} | — | January 29, 2000 | Kitt Peak | Spacewatch | · | 2.1 km | MPC · JPL |
| 297358 | 2000 CT_{19} | — | February 2, 2000 | Socorro | LINEAR | · | 1.6 km | MPC · JPL |
| 297359 | 2000 CL_{106} | — | February 5, 2000 | Kitt Peak | M. W. Buie | · | 1.7 km | MPC · JPL |
| 297360 | 2000 CH_{119} | — | February 6, 2000 | Kitt Peak | M. W. Buie | NEM | 2.3 km | MPC · JPL |
| 297361 | 2000 CE_{131} | — | February 3, 2000 | Kitt Peak | Spacewatch | · | 1.5 km | MPC · JPL |
| 297362 | 2000 CT_{140} | — | February 6, 2000 | Kitt Peak | Spacewatch | · | 1.9 km | MPC · JPL |
| 297363 | 2000 DG_{11} | — | February 27, 2000 | Kitt Peak | Spacewatch | · | 1.9 km | MPC · JPL |
| 297364 | 2000 DS_{16} | — | February 29, 2000 | Socorro | LINEAR | · | 1.5 km | MPC · JPL |
| 297365 | 2000 DO_{46} | — | February 29, 2000 | Socorro | LINEAR | · | 2.6 km | MPC · JPL |
| 297366 | 2000 DP_{49} | — | February 29, 2000 | Socorro | LINEAR | · | 2.0 km | MPC · JPL |
| 297367 | 2000 DV_{49} | — | February 29, 2000 | Socorro | LINEAR | DOR | 3.5 km | MPC · JPL |
| 297368 | 2000 DH_{90} | — | February 27, 2000 | Kitt Peak | Spacewatch | · | 1.5 km | MPC · JPL |
| 297369 | 2000 EY_{35} | — | March 3, 2000 | Socorro | LINEAR | · | 890 m | MPC · JPL |
| 297370 | 2000 EO_{175} | — | March 3, 2000 | Socorro | LINEAR | BAR | 2.5 km | MPC · JPL |
| 297371 | 2000 FC_{51} | — | March 29, 2000 | Kitt Peak | Spacewatch | · | 2.3 km | MPC · JPL |
| 297372 | 2000 GJ_{88} | — | April 4, 2000 | Socorro | LINEAR | · | 2.5 km | MPC · JPL |
| 297373 | 2000 GN_{170} | — | April 5, 2000 | Anderson Mesa | LONEOS | DOR | 3.3 km | MPC · JPL |
| 297374 | 2000 HA_{95} | — | April 29, 2000 | Anderson Mesa | LONEOS | H | 670 m | MPC · JPL |
| 297375 | 2000 JE_{8} | — | May 5, 2000 | Kitt Peak | Spacewatch | HOF | 3.0 km | MPC · JPL |
| 297376 | 2000 JX_{42} | — | May 7, 2000 | Socorro | LINEAR | · | 2.8 km | MPC · JPL |
| 297377 | 2000 KC_{37} | — | May 24, 2000 | Kitt Peak | Spacewatch | · | 1.4 km | MPC · JPL |
| 297378 | 2000 KR_{44} | — | May 28, 2000 | Kitt Peak | Spacewatch | · | 2.6 km | MPC · JPL |
| 297379 | 2000 OR_{40} | — | July 30, 2000 | Socorro | LINEAR | · | 2.0 km | MPC · JPL |
| 297380 | 2000 OS_{49} | — | July 31, 2000 | Socorro | LINEAR | · | 1.5 km | MPC · JPL |
| 297381 | 2000 PL_{27} | — | August 3, 2000 | Kitt Peak | Spacewatch | · | 1.3 km | MPC · JPL |
| 297382 | 2000 QC | — | August 21, 2000 | Emerald Lane | L. Ball | · | 3.5 km | MPC · JPL |
| 297383 | 2000 QO_{1} | — | August 23, 2000 | Ondřejov | P. Kušnirák, P. Pravec | · | 1.6 km | MPC · JPL |
| 297384 | 2000 QB_{13} | — | August 24, 2000 | Socorro | LINEAR | · | 1.4 km | MPC · JPL |
| 297385 | 2000 QW_{16} | — | August 24, 2000 | Socorro | LINEAR | NYS | 1.4 km | MPC · JPL |
| 297386 | 2000 QW_{17} | — | August 24, 2000 | Socorro | LINEAR | · | 1.5 km | MPC · JPL |
| 297387 | 2000 QC_{52} | — | August 24, 2000 | Socorro | LINEAR | NYS | 1.1 km | MPC · JPL |
| 297388 | 2000 QM_{61} | — | August 28, 2000 | Socorro | LINEAR | · | 3.8 km | MPC · JPL |
| 297389 | 2000 QE_{81} | — | August 24, 2000 | Socorro | LINEAR | · | 2.4 km | MPC · JPL |
| 297390 | 2000 QR_{90} | — | August 25, 2000 | Socorro | LINEAR | ERI | 2.4 km | MPC · JPL |
| 297391 | 2000 QT_{90} | — | August 25, 2000 | Socorro | LINEAR | · | 1.5 km | MPC · JPL |
| 297392 | 2000 QG_{108} | — | August 29, 2000 | Socorro | LINEAR | · | 3.9 km | MPC · JPL |
| 297393 | 2000 QK_{109} | — | August 31, 2000 | Kitt Peak | Spacewatch | · | 2.3 km | MPC · JPL |
| 297394 | 2000 QZ_{115} | — | August 26, 2000 | Socorro | LINEAR | NYS | 1.2 km | MPC · JPL |
| 297395 | 2000 QA_{125} | — | August 29, 2000 | Socorro | LINEAR | · | 1.2 km | MPC · JPL |
| 297396 | 2000 QC_{130} | — | August 31, 2000 | Socorro | LINEAR | · | 2.7 km | MPC · JPL |
| 297397 | 2000 QL_{174} | — | August 31, 2000 | Socorro | LINEAR | · | 1.3 km | MPC · JPL |
| 297398 | 2000 QL_{177} | — | August 31, 2000 | Socorro | LINEAR | · | 1.5 km | MPC · JPL |
| 297399 | 2000 QS_{184} | — | August 26, 2000 | Socorro | LINEAR | · | 3.2 km | MPC · JPL |
| 297400 | 2000 QG_{193} | — | August 29, 2000 | Socorro | LINEAR | · | 4.1 km | MPC · JPL |

== 297401–297500 ==
back to top

| Designation | | | Discovery | | | Properties | | Ref |
| Permanent | Provisional | Named after | Date | Site | Discoverer(s) | Category | Diam. | Ref |
|---|---|---|---|---|---|---|---|---|
| 297401 | 2000 QA_{199} | — | August 29, 2000 | Socorro | LINEAR | · | 3.2 km | MPC · JPL |
| 297402 | 2000 QJ_{203} | — | August 29, 2000 | Socorro | LINEAR | NYS | 1.1 km | MPC · JPL |
| 297403 | 2000 QD_{206} | — | August 31, 2000 | Socorro | LINEAR | LIX | 5.9 km | MPC · JPL |
| 297404 | 2000 QN_{227} | — | August 31, 2000 | Socorro | LINEAR | · | 1.3 km | MPC · JPL |
| 297405 | 2000 QV_{243} | — | August 21, 2000 | Anderson Mesa | LONEOS | V | 930 m | MPC · JPL |
| 297406 | 2000 QF_{245} | — | August 25, 2000 | Cerro Tololo | M. W. Buie | · | 1.1 km | MPC · JPL |
| 297407 | 2000 RZ_{21} | — | September 1, 2000 | Socorro | LINEAR | · | 4.0 km | MPC · JPL |
| 297408 | 2000 RU_{36} | — | September 2, 2000 | Socorro | LINEAR | · | 2.8 km | MPC · JPL |
| 297409 Mållgan | 2000 RE_{39} | Mållgan | September 1, 2000 | Saltsjobaden | A. Brandeker | · | 1.3 km | MPC · JPL |
| 297410 | 2000 RR_{81} | — | September 1, 2000 | Socorro | LINEAR | · | 3.0 km | MPC · JPL |
| 297411 | 2000 RB_{107} | — | September 3, 2000 | Apache Point | SDSS | NYS | 1.5 km | MPC · JPL |
| 297412 | 2000 SJ_{1} | — | September 18, 2000 | Socorro | LINEAR | · | 4.3 km | MPC · JPL |
| 297413 | 2000 SE_{17} | — | September 23, 2000 | Socorro | LINEAR | EOS | 2.6 km | MPC · JPL |
| 297414 | 2000 SR_{18} | — | September 23, 2000 | Socorro | LINEAR | · | 4.0 km | MPC · JPL |
| 297415 | 2000 SH_{26} | — | September 23, 2000 | Socorro | LINEAR | · | 3.7 km | MPC · JPL |
| 297416 | 2000 SJ_{30} | — | September 24, 2000 | Socorro | LINEAR | · | 1.2 km | MPC · JPL |
| 297417 | 2000 SD_{42} | — | September 24, 2000 | Socorro | LINEAR | · | 3.8 km | MPC · JPL |
| 297418 | 2000 SP_{43} | — | September 25, 2000 | Socorro | LINEAR | ATE · PHA | 410 m | MPC · JPL |
| 297419 | 2000 SW_{45} | — | September 22, 2000 | Socorro | LINEAR | · | 2.7 km | MPC · JPL |
| 297420 | 2000 SO_{48} | — | September 23, 2000 | Socorro | LINEAR | · | 4.0 km | MPC · JPL |
| 297421 | 2000 SP_{51} | — | September 23, 2000 | Socorro | LINEAR | · | 3.1 km | MPC · JPL |
| 297422 | 2000 SO_{59} | — | September 24, 2000 | Socorro | LINEAR | NYS | 1.3 km | MPC · JPL |
| 297423 | 2000 SP_{59} | — | September 24, 2000 | Socorro | LINEAR | · | 4.0 km | MPC · JPL |
| 297424 | 2000 SC_{68} | — | September 24, 2000 | Socorro | LINEAR | NYS | 1.2 km | MPC · JPL |
| 297425 | 2000 SK_{75} | — | September 24, 2000 | Socorro | LINEAR | · | 1.4 km | MPC · JPL |
| 297426 | 2000 SZ_{82} | — | September 24, 2000 | Socorro | LINEAR | · | 3.4 km | MPC · JPL |
| 297427 | 2000 SZ_{89} | — | September 22, 2000 | Socorro | LINEAR | · | 3.8 km | MPC · JPL |
| 297428 | 2000 SB_{92} | — | September 23, 2000 | Socorro | LINEAR | · | 4.7 km | MPC · JPL |
| 297429 | 2000 SH_{94} | — | September 23, 2000 | Socorro | LINEAR | · | 1.3 km | MPC · JPL |
| 297430 | 2000 SU_{96} | — | September 23, 2000 | Socorro | LINEAR | · | 1.7 km | MPC · JPL |
| 297431 | 2000 SO_{98} | — | September 23, 2000 | Socorro | LINEAR | · | 4.0 km | MPC · JPL |
| 297432 | 2000 SD_{99} | — | September 23, 2000 | Socorro | LINEAR | · | 1.9 km | MPC · JPL |
| 297433 | 2000 SK_{109} | — | September 24, 2000 | Socorro | LINEAR | ERI | 2.1 km | MPC · JPL |
| 297434 | 2000 SA_{158} | — | September 27, 2000 | Socorro | LINEAR | · | 5.0 km | MPC · JPL |
| 297435 | 2000 SB_{164} | — | September 24, 2000 | Socorro | LINEAR | H | 750 m | MPC · JPL |
| 297436 | 2000 SS_{171} | — | September 26, 2000 | Socorro | LINEAR | EUP | 4.7 km | MPC · JPL |
| 297437 | 2000 SK_{173} | — | September 28, 2000 | Socorro | LINEAR | · | 4.6 km | MPC · JPL |
| 297438 | 2000 SJ_{174} | — | September 28, 2000 | Socorro | LINEAR | · | 2.0 km | MPC · JPL |
| 297439 | 2000 SX_{174} | — | September 28, 2000 | Socorro | LINEAR | · | 3.8 km | MPC · JPL |
| 297440 | 2000 SE_{175} | — | September 28, 2000 | Socorro | LINEAR | · | 1.8 km | MPC · JPL |
| 297441 | 2000 SJ_{188} | — | September 21, 2000 | Haleakala | NEAT | MAS | 910 m | MPC · JPL |
| 297442 | 2000 SF_{191} | — | September 24, 2000 | Socorro | LINEAR | L5 | 14 km | MPC · JPL |
| 297443 | 2000 SC_{197} | — | September 24, 2000 | Socorro | LINEAR | V | 1.1 km | MPC · JPL |
| 297444 | 2000 SE_{207} | — | September 24, 2000 | Socorro | LINEAR | · | 3.9 km | MPC · JPL |
| 297445 | 2000 SQ_{214} | — | September 26, 2000 | Socorro | LINEAR | NYS | 1.2 km | MPC · JPL |
| 297446 | 2000 SU_{218} | — | September 26, 2000 | Socorro | LINEAR | PHO | 1.3 km | MPC · JPL |
| 297447 | 2000 SF_{239} | — | September 27, 2000 | Socorro | LINEAR | MAS | 770 m | MPC · JPL |
| 297448 | 2000 SW_{240} | — | September 27, 2000 | Socorro | LINEAR | H | 780 m | MPC · JPL |
| 297449 | 2000 SN_{245} | — | September 24, 2000 | Socorro | LINEAR | NYS | 1.2 km | MPC · JPL |
| 297450 | 2000 SS_{249} | — | September 24, 2000 | Socorro | LINEAR | · | 4.0 km | MPC · JPL |
| 297451 | 2000 SC_{250} | — | September 24, 2000 | Socorro | LINEAR | · | 1.5 km | MPC · JPL |
| 297452 | 2000 SD_{252} | — | September 24, 2000 | Socorro | LINEAR | · | 2.6 km | MPC · JPL |
| 297453 | 2000 SP_{253} | — | September 24, 2000 | Socorro | LINEAR | NYS | 1.5 km | MPC · JPL |
| 297454 | 2000 SD_{262} | — | September 25, 2000 | Socorro | LINEAR | · | 1.7 km | MPC · JPL |
| 297455 | 2000 SZ_{267} | — | September 27, 2000 | Socorro | LINEAR | · | 3.6 km | MPC · JPL |
| 297456 | 2000 SD_{276} | — | September 28, 2000 | Socorro | LINEAR | T_{j} (2.97) | 4.4 km | MPC · JPL |
| 297457 | 2000 SG_{279} | — | September 30, 2000 | Socorro | LINEAR | · | 1.7 km | MPC · JPL |
| 297458 | 2000 SO_{290} | — | September 27, 2000 | Socorro | LINEAR | TIR | 3.4 km | MPC · JPL |
| 297459 | 2000 SG_{292} | — | September 27, 2000 | Socorro | LINEAR | · | 4.5 km | MPC · JPL |
| 297460 | 2000 SV_{300} | — | September 28, 2000 | Socorro | LINEAR | V | 880 m | MPC · JPL |
| 297461 | 2000 SF_{309} | — | September 30, 2000 | Socorro | LINEAR | · | 3.0 km | MPC · JPL |
| 297462 | 2000 SV_{310} | — | September 26, 2000 | Socorro | LINEAR | TIR | 4.3 km | MPC · JPL |
| 297463 | 2000 SD_{318} | — | September 30, 2000 | Socorro | LINEAR | · | 5.6 km | MPC · JPL |
| 297464 | 2000 SP_{323} | — | September 28, 2000 | Kitt Peak | Spacewatch | · | 3.2 km | MPC · JPL |
| 297465 | 2000 SZ_{327} | — | September 30, 2000 | Socorro | LINEAR | · | 4.5 km | MPC · JPL |
| 297466 | 2000 SV_{329} | — | September 27, 2000 | Socorro | LINEAR | · | 4.4 km | MPC · JPL |
| 297467 | 2000 SQ_{330} | — | September 27, 2000 | Kitt Peak | Spacewatch | · | 3.1 km | MPC · JPL |
| 297468 | 2000 SV_{343} | — | September 23, 2000 | Socorro | LINEAR | · | 1.7 km | MPC · JPL |
| 297469 | 2000 SX_{343} | — | September 22, 2000 | Socorro | LINEAR | · | 3.0 km | MPC · JPL |
| 297470 | 2000 SD_{349} | — | September 30, 2000 | Anderson Mesa | LONEOS | · | 3.2 km | MPC · JPL |
| 297471 | 2000 TA_{5} | — | October 1, 2000 | Socorro | LINEAR | · | 3.6 km | MPC · JPL |
| 297472 | 2000 TT_{21} | — | October 1, 2000 | Socorro | LINEAR | · | 4.5 km | MPC · JPL |
| 297473 | 2000 TX_{21} | — | October 2, 2000 | Socorro | LINEAR | · | 1.7 km | MPC · JPL |
| 297474 | 2000 TT_{27} | — | October 3, 2000 | Socorro | LINEAR | · | 4.6 km | MPC · JPL |
| 297475 | 2000 TS_{30} | — | October 2, 2000 | Kitt Peak | Spacewatch | · | 4.1 km | MPC · JPL |
| 297476 | 2000 TX_{31} | — | October 4, 2000 | Kitt Peak | Spacewatch | · | 4.2 km | MPC · JPL |
| 297477 | 2000 TV_{41} | — | October 1, 2000 | Socorro | LINEAR | · | 1.8 km | MPC · JPL |
| 297478 | 2000 TW_{58} | — | October 2, 2000 | Anderson Mesa | LONEOS | TIR | 3.5 km | MPC · JPL |
| 297479 | 2000 TB_{61} | — | October 2, 2000 | Anderson Mesa | LONEOS | · | 4.0 km | MPC · JPL |
| 297480 | 2000 TC_{61} | — | October 2, 2000 | Anderson Mesa | LONEOS | · | 4.7 km | MPC · JPL |
| 297481 | 2000 TQ_{66} | — | October 1, 2000 | Socorro | LINEAR | · | 1.1 km | MPC · JPL |
| 297482 | 2000 UH_{3} | — | October 24, 2000 | Socorro | LINEAR | H | 700 m | MPC · JPL |
| 297483 | 2000 UA_{14} | — | October 27, 2000 | Kitt Peak | Spacewatch | V | 820 m | MPC · JPL |
| 297484 | 2000 UJ_{15} | — | October 29, 2000 | Oaxaca | Roe, J. M. | · | 1.6 km | MPC · JPL |
| 297485 | 2000 UB_{25} | — | October 24, 2000 | Socorro | LINEAR | · | 1.2 km | MPC · JPL |
| 297486 | 2000 UL_{28} | — | October 25, 2000 | Socorro | LINEAR | · | 2.1 km | MPC · JPL |
| 297487 | 2000 UA_{33} | — | October 29, 2000 | Kitt Peak | Spacewatch | · | 1.7 km | MPC · JPL |
| 297488 | 2000 UL_{33} | — | October 30, 2000 | Kitt Peak | Spacewatch | · | 3.8 km | MPC · JPL |
| 297489 | 2000 UL_{57} | — | October 25, 2000 | Socorro | LINEAR | · | 1.6 km | MPC · JPL |
| 297490 | 2000 UK_{69} | — | October 25, 2000 | Socorro | LINEAR | LIX | 4.9 km | MPC · JPL |
| 297491 | 2000 UT_{93} | — | October 25, 2000 | Socorro | LINEAR | · | 4.5 km | MPC · JPL |
| 297492 | 2000 VR_{13} | — | November 1, 2000 | Socorro | LINEAR | · | 4.2 km | MPC · JPL |
| 297493 | 2000 VQ_{21} | — | November 1, 2000 | Socorro | LINEAR | · | 3.1 km | MPC · JPL |
| 297494 | 2000 VK_{22} | — | November 1, 2000 | Socorro | LINEAR | · | 1.7 km | MPC · JPL |
| 297495 | 2000 VT_{22} | — | November 1, 2000 | Socorro | LINEAR | LIX | 5.4 km | MPC · JPL |
| 297496 | 2000 WT_{3} | — | November 19, 2000 | Socorro | LINEAR | · | 2.4 km | MPC · JPL |
| 297497 | 2000 WG_{4} | — | November 19, 2000 | Socorro | LINEAR | · | 2.2 km | MPC · JPL |
| 297498 | 2000 WH_{45} | — | November 21, 2000 | Socorro | LINEAR | · | 1.1 km | MPC · JPL |
| 297499 | 2000 WB_{47} | — | November 21, 2000 | Socorro | LINEAR | NYS | 1.5 km | MPC · JPL |
| 297500 | 2000 WH_{51} | — | November 26, 2000 | Kitt Peak | Spacewatch | · | 4.8 km | MPC · JPL |

== 297501–297600 ==
back to top

| Designation | | | Discovery | | | Properties | | Ref |
| Permanent | Provisional | Named after | Date | Site | Discoverer(s) | Category | Diam. | Ref |
|---|---|---|---|---|---|---|---|---|
| 297501 | 2000 WV_{51} | — | November 27, 2000 | Kitt Peak | Spacewatch | · | 1.8 km | MPC · JPL |
| 297502 | 2000 WE_{67} | — | November 26, 2000 | Socorro | LINEAR | EUP | 5.9 km | MPC · JPL |
| 297503 | 2000 WO_{129} | — | November 19, 2000 | Kitt Peak | Spacewatch | V | 1.2 km | MPC · JPL |
| 297504 | 2000 WW_{130} | — | November 20, 2000 | Anderson Mesa | LONEOS | · | 1.2 km | MPC · JPL |
| 297505 | 2000 WM_{132} | — | November 19, 2000 | Socorro | LINEAR | · | 4.3 km | MPC · JPL |
| 297506 | 2000 WE_{188} | — | November 16, 2000 | Kitt Peak | Spacewatch | HYG | 3.6 km | MPC · JPL |
| 297507 | 2000 WC_{189} | — | November 18, 2000 | Anderson Mesa | LONEOS | NYS | 1.4 km | MPC · JPL |
| 297508 | 2000 WX_{195} | — | November 30, 2000 | Socorro | LINEAR | · | 1.9 km | MPC · JPL |
| 297509 | 2000 XW_{2} | — | December 1, 2000 | Socorro | LINEAR | LUT | 5.1 km | MPC · JPL |
| 297510 | 2000 XM_{4} | — | December 1, 2000 | Socorro | LINEAR | · | 4.2 km | MPC · JPL |
| 297511 | 2000 XF_{33} | — | December 4, 2000 | Socorro | LINEAR | THB | 4.8 km | MPC · JPL |
| 297512 | 2000 YQ_{6} | — | December 20, 2000 | Socorro | LINEAR | · | 1.8 km | MPC · JPL |
| 297513 | 2000 YQ_{55} | — | December 30, 2000 | Socorro | LINEAR | · | 1.6 km | MPC · JPL |
| 297514 | 2000 YB_{89} | — | December 30, 2000 | Socorro | LINEAR | (11097) | 3.5 km | MPC · JPL |
| 297515 | 2000 YW_{117} | — | December 30, 2000 | Socorro | LINEAR | · | 2.1 km | MPC · JPL |
| 297516 | 2001 BN_{1} | — | January 17, 2001 | Socorro | LINEAR | · | 2.4 km | MPC · JPL |
| 297517 | 2001 BO_{40} | — | January 21, 2001 | Socorro | LINEAR | · | 1.4 km | MPC · JPL |
| 297518 | 2001 BQ_{43} | — | January 19, 2001 | Socorro | LINEAR | · | 2.8 km | MPC · JPL |
| 297519 | 2001 BP_{72} | — | January 27, 2001 | Haleakala | NEAT | · | 1.5 km | MPC · JPL |
| 297520 | 2001 BC_{79} | — | January 21, 2001 | Socorro | LINEAR | · | 1.8 km | MPC · JPL |
| 297521 | 2001 CE | — | February 1, 2001 | Prescott | P. G. Comba | · | 1.4 km | MPC · JPL |
| 297522 | 2001 CJ_{15} | — | February 1, 2001 | Socorro | LINEAR | · | 2.1 km | MPC · JPL |
| 297523 | 2001 CD_{40} | — | February 13, 2001 | Socorro | LINEAR | · | 1.9 km | MPC · JPL |
| 297524 | 2001 DC_{35} | — | February 19, 2001 | Socorro | LINEAR | · | 1.5 km | MPC · JPL |
| 297525 | 2001 DU_{45} | — | February 19, 2001 | Socorro | LINEAR | · | 2.4 km | MPC · JPL |
| 297526 | 2001 DT_{70} | — | February 19, 2001 | Socorro | LINEAR | JUN | 1.4 km | MPC · JPL |
| 297527 | 2001 FP_{7} | — | March 19, 2001 | Kitt Peak | Spacewatch | MAR | 1.3 km | MPC · JPL |
| 297528 | 2001 FG_{20} | — | March 19, 2001 | Anderson Mesa | LONEOS | JUN | 1.8 km | MPC · JPL |
| 297529 | 2001 FX_{21} | — | March 21, 2001 | Anderson Mesa | LONEOS | · | 1.9 km | MPC · JPL |
| 297530 | 2001 FH_{31} | — | March 21, 2001 | Haleakala | NEAT | · | 640 m | MPC · JPL |
| 297531 | 2001 FL_{85} | — | March 26, 2001 | Kitt Peak | Spacewatch | · | 1.7 km | MPC · JPL |
| 297532 | 2001 FH_{115} | — | March 19, 2001 | Anderson Mesa | LONEOS | · | 1.3 km | MPC · JPL |
| 297533 | 2001 FF_{156} | — | March 26, 2001 | Haleakala | NEAT | · | 2.1 km | MPC · JPL |
| 297534 | 2001 HO_{38} | — | April 24, 2001 | Kitt Peak | Spacewatch | · | 2.4 km | MPC · JPL |
| 297535 | 2001 HN_{55} | — | April 24, 2001 | Socorro | LINEAR | · | 1.0 km | MPC · JPL |
| 297536 | 2001 KK_{4} | — | May 17, 2001 | Socorro | LINEAR | · | 2.8 km | MPC · JPL |
| 297537 | 2001 KF_{64} | — | May 21, 2001 | Socorro | LINEAR | · | 2.0 km | MPC · JPL |
| 297538 | 2001 OL_{39} | — | July 20, 2001 | Palomar | NEAT | · | 1.0 km | MPC · JPL |
| 297539 | 2001 OY_{51} | — | July 21, 2001 | Palomar | NEAT | · | 640 m | MPC · JPL |
| 297540 | 2001 PQ_{37} | — | August 11, 2001 | Palomar | NEAT | · | 2.7 km | MPC · JPL |
| 297541 | 2001 PW_{41} | — | August 11, 2001 | Haleakala | NEAT | · | 1.1 km | MPC · JPL |
| 297542 | 2001 PX_{54} | — | August 14, 2001 | Haleakala | NEAT | · | 700 m | MPC · JPL |
| 297543 | 2001 QT_{26} | — | August 16, 2001 | Socorro | LINEAR | · | 850 m | MPC · JPL |
| 297544 | 2001 QA_{123} | — | August 19, 2001 | Socorro | LINEAR | · | 810 m | MPC · JPL |
| 297545 | 2001 QS_{128} | — | August 20, 2001 | Socorro | LINEAR | · | 4.1 km | MPC · JPL |
| 297546 | 2001 QB_{144} | — | August 21, 2001 | Kitt Peak | Spacewatch | KOR | 1.7 km | MPC · JPL |
| 297547 | 2001 QM_{145} | — | August 24, 2001 | Kitt Peak | Spacewatch | KOR | 1.5 km | MPC · JPL |
| 297548 | 2001 QH_{155} | — | August 23, 2001 | Anderson Mesa | LONEOS | · | 2.6 km | MPC · JPL |
| 297549 | 2001 QG_{203} | — | August 23, 2001 | Anderson Mesa | LONEOS | · | 740 m | MPC · JPL |
| 297550 | 2001 QY_{205} | — | August 23, 2001 | Anderson Mesa | LONEOS | · | 1.2 km | MPC · JPL |
| 297551 | 2001 QO_{221} | — | August 24, 2001 | Anderson Mesa | LONEOS | · | 3.5 km | MPC · JPL |
| 297552 | 2001 QF_{231} | — | August 24, 2001 | Anderson Mesa | LONEOS | · | 800 m | MPC · JPL |
| 297553 | 2001 QU_{240} | — | August 24, 2001 | Socorro | LINEAR | · | 3.3 km | MPC · JPL |
| 297554 | 2001 QE_{271} | — | August 19, 2001 | Socorro | LINEAR | BRA | 2.0 km | MPC · JPL |
| 297555 | 2001 QR_{271} | — | August 19, 2001 | Socorro | LINEAR | · | 950 m | MPC · JPL |
| 297556 | 2001 QZ_{282} | — | August 18, 2001 | Anderson Mesa | LONEOS | BRA | 2.2 km | MPC · JPL |
| 297557 | 2001 QV_{329} | — | August 24, 2001 | Anderson Mesa | LONEOS | (16286) | 3.0 km | MPC · JPL |
| 297558 | 2001 QX_{329} | — | August 25, 2001 | Socorro | LINEAR | · | 730 m | MPC · JPL |
| 297559 | 2001 QS_{334} | — | August 26, 2001 | Palomar | NEAT | · | 2.6 km | MPC · JPL |
| 297560 | 2001 RT_{3} | — | September 7, 2001 | Socorro | LINEAR | · | 830 m | MPC · JPL |
| 297561 | 2001 RA_{9} | — | September 8, 2001 | Socorro | LINEAR | · | 960 m | MPC · JPL |
| 297562 | 2001 RQ_{26} | — | September 7, 2001 | Socorro | LINEAR | · | 710 m | MPC · JPL |
| 297563 | 2001 RQ_{28} | — | September 7, 2001 | Socorro | LINEAR | · | 780 m | MPC · JPL |
| 297564 | 2001 RJ_{29} | — | September 7, 2001 | Socorro | LINEAR | · | 850 m | MPC · JPL |
| 297565 | 2001 RR_{34} | — | September 8, 2001 | Socorro | LINEAR | · | 820 m | MPC · JPL |
| 297566 | 2001 RT_{54} | — | September 12, 2001 | Socorro | LINEAR | · | 790 m | MPC · JPL |
| 297567 | 2001 RO_{64} | — | September 10, 2001 | Socorro | LINEAR | · | 870 m | MPC · JPL |
| 297568 | 2001 RH_{85} | — | September 11, 2001 | Anderson Mesa | LONEOS | · | 910 m | MPC · JPL |
| 297569 | 2001 RH_{94} | — | September 11, 2001 | Anderson Mesa | LONEOS | · | 970 m | MPC · JPL |
| 297570 | 2001 RA_{98} | — | September 12, 2001 | Kitt Peak | Spacewatch | · | 2.0 km | MPC · JPL |
| 297571 | 2001 RS_{98} | — | September 8, 2001 | Socorro | LINEAR | H | 650 m | MPC · JPL |
| 297572 | 2001 RK_{103} | — | September 12, 2001 | Socorro | LINEAR | KOR | 2.0 km | MPC · JPL |
| 297573 | 2001 RK_{108} | — | September 12, 2001 | Socorro | LINEAR | · | 2.2 km | MPC · JPL |
| 297574 | 2001 RO_{110} | — | September 12, 2001 | Socorro | LINEAR | · | 890 m | MPC · JPL |
| 297575 | 2001 RM_{116} | — | September 12, 2001 | Socorro | LINEAR | · | 1.1 km | MPC · JPL |
| 297576 | 2001 RE_{117} | — | September 12, 2001 | Socorro | LINEAR | · | 700 m | MPC · JPL |
| 297577 | 2001 RJ_{122} | — | September 12, 2001 | Socorro | LINEAR | BRA | 2.2 km | MPC · JPL |
| 297578 | 2001 RH_{143} | — | September 15, 2001 | Palomar | NEAT | · | 1.0 km | MPC · JPL |
| 297579 | 2001 SX_{2} | — | September 17, 2001 | Desert Eagle | W. K. Y. Yeung | · | 770 m | MPC · JPL |
| 297580 | 2001 SN_{7} | — | September 18, 2001 | Kitt Peak | Spacewatch | · | 750 m | MPC · JPL |
| 297581 | 2001 SW_{10} | — | September 16, 2001 | Socorro | LINEAR | · | 2.7 km | MPC · JPL |
| 297582 | 2001 SY_{12} | — | September 16, 2001 | Socorro | LINEAR | · | 2.4 km | MPC · JPL |
| 297583 | 2001 SP_{16} | — | September 16, 2001 | Socorro | LINEAR | · | 910 m | MPC · JPL |
| 297584 | 2001 SY_{31} | — | September 16, 2001 | Socorro | LINEAR | · | 910 m | MPC · JPL |
| 297585 | 2001 SM_{68} | — | September 17, 2001 | Socorro | LINEAR | H | 740 m | MPC · JPL |
| 297586 | 2001 SM_{77} | — | September 17, 2001 | Socorro | LINEAR | · | 990 m | MPC · JPL |
| 297587 | 2001 SN_{78} | — | September 19, 2001 | Socorro | LINEAR | KOR | 1.6 km | MPC · JPL |
| 297588 | 2001 SF_{81} | — | September 20, 2001 | Socorro | LINEAR | · | 910 m | MPC · JPL |
| 297589 | 2001 SG_{83} | — | September 20, 2001 | Socorro | LINEAR | · | 1.0 km | MPC · JPL |
| 297590 | 2001 SX_{84} | — | September 20, 2001 | Socorro | LINEAR | · | 2.9 km | MPC · JPL |
| 297591 | 2001 SL_{90} | — | September 20, 2001 | Socorro | LINEAR | · | 1.5 km | MPC · JPL |
| 297592 | 2001 SQ_{90} | — | September 20, 2001 | Socorro | LINEAR | · | 2.5 km | MPC · JPL |
| 297593 | 2001 SJ_{99} | — | September 20, 2001 | Socorro | LINEAR | · | 2.6 km | MPC · JPL |
| 297594 | 2001 SL_{104} | — | September 20, 2001 | Socorro | LINEAR | · | 2.6 km | MPC · JPL |
| 297595 | 2001 SF_{131} | — | September 16, 2001 | Socorro | LINEAR | · | 1.1 km | MPC · JPL |
| 297596 | 2001 SZ_{147} | — | September 17, 2001 | Socorro | LINEAR | · | 2.3 km | MPC · JPL |
| 297597 | 2001 SK_{156} | — | September 17, 2001 | Socorro | LINEAR | · | 910 m | MPC · JPL |
| 297598 | 2001 SJ_{194} | — | September 19, 2001 | Socorro | LINEAR | TRE | 2.7 km | MPC · JPL |
| 297599 | 2001 SU_{200} | — | September 19, 2001 | Socorro | LINEAR | KOR | 1.4 km | MPC · JPL |
| 297600 | 2001 SJ_{207} | — | September 19, 2001 | Socorro | LINEAR | · | 690 m | MPC · JPL |

== 297601–297700 ==
back to top

| Designation | | | Discovery | | | Properties | | Ref |
| Permanent | Provisional | Named after | Date | Site | Discoverer(s) | Category | Diam. | Ref |
|---|---|---|---|---|---|---|---|---|
| 297601 | 2001 SC_{215} | — | September 19, 2001 | Socorro | LINEAR | · | 1.7 km | MPC · JPL |
| 297602 | 2001 SX_{217} | — | September 19, 2001 | Socorro | LINEAR | · | 830 m | MPC · JPL |
| 297603 | 2001 SW_{219} | — | September 19, 2001 | Socorro | LINEAR | · | 840 m | MPC · JPL |
| 297604 | 2001 SU_{220} | — | September 19, 2001 | Socorro | LINEAR | · | 1.9 km | MPC · JPL |
| 297605 | 2001 SW_{223} | — | September 19, 2001 | Socorro | LINEAR | KOR | 1.8 km | MPC · JPL |
| 297606 | 2001 SV_{226} | — | September 19, 2001 | Socorro | LINEAR | KOR | 2.2 km | MPC · JPL |
| 297607 | 2001 SQ_{235} | — | September 19, 2001 | Socorro | LINEAR | · | 710 m | MPC · JPL |
| 297608 | 2001 SR_{239} | — | September 19, 2001 | Socorro | LINEAR | · | 650 m | MPC · JPL |
| 297609 | 2001 SN_{274} | — | September 20, 2001 | Kitt Peak | Spacewatch | NAE | 3.1 km | MPC · JPL |
| 297610 | 2001 SO_{301} | — | September 20, 2001 | Socorro | LINEAR | · | 2.6 km | MPC · JPL |
| 297611 | 2001 SN_{319} | — | September 21, 2001 | Socorro | LINEAR | · | 710 m | MPC · JPL |
| 297612 | 2001 SQ_{328} | — | September 19, 2001 | Anderson Mesa | LONEOS | · | 670 m | MPC · JPL |
| 297613 | 2001 ST_{347} | — | September 25, 2001 | Socorro | LINEAR | · | 3.4 km | MPC · JPL |
| 297614 | 2001 SZ_{348} | — | September 28, 2001 | Palomar | NEAT | · | 870 m | MPC · JPL |
| 297615 | 2001 SY_{354} | — | September 17, 2001 | Anderson Mesa | LONEOS | · | 870 m | MPC · JPL |
| 297616 | 2001 TS_{3} | — | October 7, 2001 | Palomar | NEAT | · | 2.2 km | MPC · JPL |
| 297617 | 2001 TZ_{16} | — | October 12, 2001 | Campo Imperatore | CINEOS | · | 940 m | MPC · JPL |
| 297618 | 2001 TM_{22} | — | October 13, 2001 | Socorro | LINEAR | · | 820 m | MPC · JPL |
| 297619 | 2001 TO_{31} | — | October 14, 2001 | Socorro | LINEAR | · | 3.2 km | MPC · JPL |
| 297620 | 2001 TQ_{32} | — | October 14, 2001 | Socorro | LINEAR | · | 870 m | MPC · JPL |
| 297621 | 2001 TZ_{32} | — | October 14, 2001 | Socorro | LINEAR | · | 3.1 km | MPC · JPL |
| 297622 | 2001 TB_{40} | — | October 14, 2001 | Socorro | LINEAR | PHO | 1.7 km | MPC · JPL |
| 297623 | 2001 TV_{50} | — | October 13, 2001 | Socorro | LINEAR | · | 810 m | MPC · JPL |
| 297624 | 2001 TQ_{53} | — | October 13, 2001 | Socorro | LINEAR | · | 870 m | MPC · JPL |
| 297625 | 2001 TC_{69} | — | October 13, 2001 | Socorro | LINEAR | · | 3.0 km | MPC · JPL |
| 297626 | 2001 TB_{70} | — | October 13, 2001 | Socorro | LINEAR | · | 1.9 km | MPC · JPL |
| 297627 | 2001 TT_{81} | — | October 14, 2001 | Socorro | LINEAR | · | 3.6 km | MPC · JPL |
| 297628 | 2001 TR_{85} | — | October 14, 2001 | Socorro | LINEAR | · | 900 m | MPC · JPL |
| 297629 | 2001 TC_{86} | — | October 14, 2001 | Socorro | LINEAR | · | 1.0 km | MPC · JPL |
| 297630 | 2001 TQ_{88} | — | October 14, 2001 | Socorro | LINEAR | · | 840 m | MPC · JPL |
| 297631 | 2001 TJ_{89} | — | October 14, 2001 | Socorro | LINEAR | · | 990 m | MPC · JPL |
| 297632 | 2001 TX_{90} | — | October 14, 2001 | Socorro | LINEAR | · | 710 m | MPC · JPL |
| 297633 | 2001 TP_{91} | — | October 14, 2001 | Socorro | LINEAR | · | 2.7 km | MPC · JPL |
| 297634 | 2001 TL_{95} | — | October 14, 2001 | Socorro | LINEAR | EOS | 2.8 km | MPC · JPL |
| 297635 | 2001 TJ_{122} | — | October 15, 2001 | Socorro | LINEAR | · | 1.0 km | MPC · JPL |
| 297636 | 2001 TE_{130} | — | October 15, 2001 | Kitt Peak | Spacewatch | THM | 2.9 km | MPC · JPL |
| 297637 | 2001 TX_{140} | — | October 10, 2001 | Palomar | NEAT | · | 840 m | MPC · JPL |
| 297638 | 2001 TM_{145} | — | October 10, 2001 | Palomar | NEAT | · | 1.0 km | MPC · JPL |
| 297639 | 2001 TA_{148} | — | October 10, 2001 | Palomar | NEAT | · | 2.0 km | MPC · JPL |
| 297640 | 2001 TZ_{154} | — | October 15, 2001 | Palomar | NEAT | EOS | 2.8 km | MPC · JPL |
| 297641 | 2001 TF_{155} | — | October 13, 2001 | Kitt Peak | Spacewatch | · | 3.1 km | MPC · JPL |
| 297642 | 2001 TP_{157} | — | October 14, 2001 | Kitt Peak | Spacewatch | TEL | 1.8 km | MPC · JPL |
| 297643 | 2001 TE_{161} | — | October 11, 2001 | Palomar | NEAT | · | 920 m | MPC · JPL |
| 297644 | 2001 TJ_{176} | — | October 14, 2001 | Socorro | LINEAR | L5 | 10 km | MPC · JPL |
| 297645 | 2001 TP_{181} | — | October 14, 2001 | Socorro | LINEAR | · | 910 m | MPC · JPL |
| 297646 | 2001 TF_{190} | — | October 14, 2001 | Socorro | LINEAR | PHO | 1.2 km | MPC · JPL |
| 297647 | 2001 TK_{199} | — | October 11, 2001 | Socorro | LINEAR | · | 2.0 km | MPC · JPL |
| 297648 | 2001 TO_{201} | — | October 11, 2001 | Socorro | LINEAR | · | 920 m | MPC · JPL |
| 297649 | 2001 TQ_{203} | — | October 11, 2001 | Socorro | LINEAR | · | 840 m | MPC · JPL |
| 297650 | 2001 TA_{213} | — | October 13, 2001 | Anderson Mesa | LONEOS | EOS | 2.8 km | MPC · JPL |
| 297651 | 2001 TY_{215} | — | October 13, 2001 | Palomar | NEAT | · | 3.8 km | MPC · JPL |
| 297652 | 2001 TV_{228} | — | October 15, 2001 | Kitt Peak | Spacewatch | · | 2.3 km | MPC · JPL |
| 297653 | 2001 TZ_{229} | — | October 15, 2001 | Kitt Peak | Spacewatch | · | 2.8 km | MPC · JPL |
| 297654 | 2001 TN_{235} | — | October 15, 2001 | Palomar | NEAT | · | 940 m | MPC · JPL |
| 297655 | 2001 TF_{240} | — | October 11, 2001 | Palomar | NEAT | · | 950 m | MPC · JPL |
| 297656 | 2001 TU_{253} | — | October 14, 2001 | Apache Point | SDSS | · | 940 m | MPC · JPL |
| 297657 | 2001 TS_{258} | — | October 10, 2001 | Palomar | NEAT | · | 720 m | MPC · JPL |
| 297658 | 2001 TL_{259} | — | October 8, 2001 | Palomar | NEAT | · | 2.1 km | MPC · JPL |
| 297659 | 2001 TR_{261} | — | October 11, 2001 | Palomar | NEAT | · | 3.3 km | MPC · JPL |
| 297660 | 2001 UE_{25} | — | October 18, 2001 | Socorro | LINEAR | · | 2.6 km | MPC · JPL |
| 297661 | 2001 UT_{27} | — | October 16, 2001 | Socorro | LINEAR | · | 860 m | MPC · JPL |
| 297662 | 2001 UT_{36} | — | October 16, 2001 | Socorro | LINEAR | · | 2.9 km | MPC · JPL |
| 297663 | 2001 US_{45} | — | October 17, 2001 | Socorro | LINEAR | · | 810 m | MPC · JPL |
| 297664 | 2001 UP_{53} | — | October 17, 2001 | Socorro | LINEAR | · | 2.9 km | MPC · JPL |
| 297665 | 2001 UJ_{56} | — | October 17, 2001 | Socorro | LINEAR | EOS | 2.5 km | MPC · JPL |
| 297666 | 2001 US_{67} | — | October 20, 2001 | Socorro | LINEAR | · | 780 m | MPC · JPL |
| 297667 | 2001 UJ_{79} | — | October 20, 2001 | Socorro | LINEAR | · | 2.3 km | MPC · JPL |
| 297668 | 2001 UK_{79} | — | October 20, 2001 | Socorro | LINEAR | · | 4.6 km | MPC · JPL |
| 297669 | 2001 UC_{81} | — | October 20, 2001 | Socorro | LINEAR | · | 5.5 km | MPC · JPL |
| 297670 | 2001 UO_{81} | — | October 20, 2001 | Socorro | LINEAR | · | 820 m | MPC · JPL |
| 297671 | 2001 UA_{88} | — | October 21, 2001 | Kitt Peak | Spacewatch | · | 720 m | MPC · JPL |
| 297672 | 2001 UL_{95} | — | October 19, 2001 | Palomar | NEAT | · | 810 m | MPC · JPL |
| 297673 | 2001 UJ_{108} | — | October 20, 2001 | Socorro | LINEAR | · | 880 m | MPC · JPL |
| 297674 | 2001 UD_{114} | — | October 22, 2001 | Socorro | LINEAR | · | 4.3 km | MPC · JPL |
| 297675 | 2001 UJ_{119} | — | October 22, 2001 | Socorro | LINEAR | · | 780 m | MPC · JPL |
| 297676 | 2001 UT_{131} | — | October 20, 2001 | Socorro | LINEAR | · | 900 m | MPC · JPL |
| 297677 | 2001 UG_{135} | — | October 22, 2001 | Socorro | LINEAR | · | 2.8 km | MPC · JPL |
| 297678 | 2001 UW_{139} | — | October 23, 2001 | Socorro | LINEAR | · | 1.1 km | MPC · JPL |
| 297679 | 2001 UK_{144} | — | October 23, 2001 | Socorro | LINEAR | · | 730 m | MPC · JPL |
| 297680 | 2001 US_{144} | — | October 23, 2001 | Socorro | LINEAR | · | 3.4 km | MPC · JPL |
| 297681 | 2001 UF_{148} | — | October 23, 2001 | Socorro | LINEAR | · | 1.6 km | MPC · JPL |
| 297682 | 2001 UK_{159} | — | October 23, 2001 | Socorro | LINEAR | · | 2.9 km | MPC · JPL |
| 297683 | 2001 UD_{171} | — | October 21, 2001 | Socorro | LINEAR | · | 3.1 km | MPC · JPL |
| 297684 | 2001 UC_{173} | — | October 18, 2001 | Palomar | NEAT | BAP | 1.1 km | MPC · JPL |
| 297685 | 2001 UU_{174} | — | October 19, 2001 | Palomar | NEAT | · | 670 m | MPC · JPL |
| 297686 | 2001 UD_{183} | — | October 16, 2001 | Kitt Peak | Spacewatch | TRE | 2.8 km | MPC · JPL |
| 297687 | 2001 UL_{204} | — | October 19, 2001 | Palomar | NEAT | · | 960 m | MPC · JPL |
| 297688 | 2001 UO_{206} | — | October 20, 2001 | Socorro | LINEAR | · | 950 m | MPC · JPL |
| 297689 | 2001 UC_{207} | — | October 20, 2001 | Socorro | LINEAR | · | 790 m | MPC · JPL |
| 297690 | 2001 UZ_{217} | — | October 24, 2001 | Kitt Peak | Spacewatch | EOS | 1.9 km | MPC · JPL |
| 297691 | 2001 UE_{220} | — | October 21, 2001 | Socorro | LINEAR | · | 1.0 km | MPC · JPL |
| 297692 | 2001 UN_{228} | — | October 29, 2001 | Palomar | NEAT | L5 | 12 km | MPC · JPL |
| 297693 | 2001 UR_{230} | — | October 25, 2001 | Apache Point | SDSS | · | 3.0 km | MPC · JPL |
| 297694 | 2001 UU_{230} | — | October 16, 2001 | Palomar | NEAT | · | 2.4 km | MPC · JPL |
| 297695 | 2001 VK_{34} | — | November 9, 2001 | Socorro | LINEAR | · | 900 m | MPC · JPL |
| 297696 | 2001 VT_{37} | — | November 9, 2001 | Socorro | LINEAR | · | 1.0 km | MPC · JPL |
| 297697 | 2001 VS_{39} | — | November 9, 2001 | Socorro | LINEAR | · | 2.6 km | MPC · JPL |
| 297698 | 2001 VX_{41} | — | November 9, 2001 | Socorro | LINEAR | · | 910 m | MPC · JPL |
| 297699 | 2001 VJ_{49} | — | November 10, 2001 | Socorro | LINEAR | · | 4.4 km | MPC · JPL |
| 297700 | 2001 VQ_{54} | — | November 10, 2001 | Socorro | LINEAR | · | 840 m | MPC · JPL |

== 297701–297800 ==
back to top

| Designation | | | Discovery | | | Properties | | Ref |
| Permanent | Provisional | Named after | Date | Site | Discoverer(s) | Category | Diam. | Ref |
|---|---|---|---|---|---|---|---|---|
| 297701 | 2001 VF_{72} | — | November 7, 2001 | Palomar | NEAT | · | 3.4 km | MPC · JPL |
| 297702 | 2001 VT_{74} | — | November 14, 2001 | Kitt Peak | Spacewatch | · | 660 m | MPC · JPL |
| 297703 | 2001 VD_{79} | — | November 9, 2001 | Palomar | NEAT | · | 940 m | MPC · JPL |
| 297704 | 2001 VL_{82} | — | November 10, 2001 | Socorro | LINEAR | · | 3.1 km | MPC · JPL |
| 297705 | 2001 VN_{82} | — | November 10, 2001 | Socorro | LINEAR | EOS | 2.1 km | MPC · JPL |
| 297706 | 2001 VJ_{91} | — | November 15, 2001 | Socorro | LINEAR | · | 2.8 km | MPC · JPL |
| 297707 | 2001 VF_{92} | — | November 15, 2001 | Socorro | LINEAR | · | 2.5 km | MPC · JPL |
| 297708 | 2001 VC_{103} | — | November 12, 2001 | Socorro | LINEAR | · | 890 m | MPC · JPL |
| 297709 | 2001 VL_{107} | — | November 12, 2001 | Socorro | LINEAR | V | 740 m | MPC · JPL |
| 297710 | 2001 VY_{110} | — | November 12, 2001 | Socorro | LINEAR | EOS | 2.7 km | MPC · JPL |
| 297711 | 2001 VP_{112} | — | November 12, 2001 | Socorro | LINEAR | · | 1.1 km | MPC · JPL |
| 297712 | 2001 VS_{118} | — | November 12, 2001 | Socorro | LINEAR | · | 1.0 km | MPC · JPL |
| 297713 | 2001 VR_{122} | — | November 15, 2001 | Palomar | NEAT | · | 1 km | MPC · JPL |
| 297714 | 2001 VY_{123} | — | November 10, 2001 | Palomar | NEAT | · | 1.1 km | MPC · JPL |
| 297715 | 2001 VZ_{123} | — | November 10, 2001 | Palomar | NEAT | · | 3.1 km | MPC · JPL |
| 297716 | 2001 VG_{125} | — | November 12, 2001 | Socorro | LINEAR | · | 3.3 km | MPC · JPL |
| 297717 | 2001 VO_{126} | — | November 15, 2001 | Kitt Peak | Spacewatch | · | 900 m | MPC · JPL |
| 297718 | 2001 WN_{12} | — | November 17, 2001 | Socorro | LINEAR | · | 3.2 km | MPC · JPL |
| 297719 | 2001 WQ_{12} | — | November 17, 2001 | Socorro | LINEAR | · | 1.7 km | MPC · JPL |
| 297720 | 2001 WS_{15} | — | November 25, 2001 | Pla D'Arguines | R. Ferrando | · | 1.2 km | MPC · JPL |
| 297721 | 2001 WT_{16} | — | November 17, 2001 | Socorro | LINEAR | · | 2.0 km | MPC · JPL |
| 297722 | 2001 WB_{20} | — | November 17, 2001 | Socorro | LINEAR | · | 770 m | MPC · JPL |
| 297723 | 2001 WJ_{23} | — | November 16, 2001 | Kitt Peak | Spacewatch | · | 750 m | MPC · JPL |
| 297724 | 2001 WD_{28} | — | November 17, 2001 | Socorro | LINEAR | · | 1.3 km | MPC · JPL |
| 297725 | 2001 WG_{30} | — | November 17, 2001 | Socorro | LINEAR | (2076) | 1.8 km | MPC · JPL |
| 297726 | 2001 WN_{31} | — | November 17, 2001 | Socorro | LINEAR | · | 2.4 km | MPC · JPL |
| 297727 | 2001 WB_{33} | — | November 17, 2001 | Socorro | LINEAR | EOS | 2.9 km | MPC · JPL |
| 297728 | 2001 WD_{34} | — | November 17, 2001 | Socorro | LINEAR | EOS | 2.0 km | MPC · JPL |
| 297729 | 2001 WK_{44} | — | November 18, 2001 | Socorro | LINEAR | · | 560 m | MPC · JPL |
| 297730 | 2001 WF_{48} | — | November 19, 2001 | Anderson Mesa | LONEOS | · | 2.8 km | MPC · JPL |
| 297731 | 2001 WK_{55} | — | November 19, 2001 | Socorro | LINEAR | · | 2.4 km | MPC · JPL |
| 297732 | 2001 WE_{57} | — | November 19, 2001 | Socorro | LINEAR | · | 2.0 km | MPC · JPL |
| 297733 | 2001 WC_{70} | — | November 20, 2001 | Socorro | LINEAR | · | 2.0 km | MPC · JPL |
| 297734 | 2001 WL_{79} | — | November 20, 2001 | Socorro | LINEAR | · | 2.5 km | MPC · JPL |
| 297735 | 2001 WZ_{80} | — | November 20, 2001 | Socorro | LINEAR | · | 830 m | MPC · JPL |
| 297736 | 2001 WR_{96} | — | November 17, 2001 | Kitt Peak | Spacewatch | · | 3.6 km | MPC · JPL |
| 297737 | 2001 XB_{2} | — | December 8, 2001 | Socorro | LINEAR | PHO | 1.4 km | MPC · JPL |
| 297738 | 2001 XM_{2} | — | December 8, 2001 | Socorro | LINEAR | · | 4.7 km | MPC · JPL |
| 297739 | 2001 XR_{10} | — | December 10, 2001 | Kitt Peak | Spacewatch | · | 2.1 km | MPC · JPL |
| 297740 | 2001 XT_{11} | — | December 9, 2001 | Socorro | LINEAR | H | 760 m | MPC · JPL |
| 297741 | 2001 XK_{12} | — | December 9, 2001 | Socorro | LINEAR | · | 3.6 km | MPC · JPL |
| 297742 | 2001 XN_{12} | — | December 9, 2001 | Socorro | LINEAR | · | 1.3 km | MPC · JPL |
| 297743 | 2001 XH_{13} | — | December 9, 2001 | Socorro | LINEAR | · | 4.7 km | MPC · JPL |
| 297744 | 2001 XQ_{13} | — | December 9, 2001 | Socorro | LINEAR | · | 3.5 km | MPC · JPL |
| 297745 | 2001 XW_{13} | — | December 9, 2001 | Socorro | LINEAR | · | 880 m | MPC · JPL |
| 297746 | 2001 XC_{15} | — | December 10, 2001 | Socorro | LINEAR | · | 2.4 km | MPC · JPL |
| 297747 | 2001 XY_{35} | — | December 13, 2001 | Palomar | NEAT | · | 730 m | MPC · JPL |
| 297748 | 2001 XU_{37} | — | December 9, 2001 | Socorro | LINEAR | · | 4.1 km | MPC · JPL |
| 297749 | 2001 XO_{44} | — | December 9, 2001 | Socorro | LINEAR | EOS | 2.6 km | MPC · JPL |
| 297750 | 2001 XL_{60} | — | December 10, 2001 | Socorro | LINEAR | · | 1.2 km | MPC · JPL |
| 297751 | 2001 XL_{63} | — | December 10, 2001 | Socorro | LINEAR | · | 4.2 km | MPC · JPL |
| 297752 | 2001 XJ_{71} | — | December 11, 2001 | Socorro | LINEAR | · | 4.4 km | MPC · JPL |
| 297753 | 2001 XB_{79} | — | December 11, 2001 | Socorro | LINEAR | EOS | 2.3 km | MPC · JPL |
| 297754 | 2001 XL_{79} | — | December 11, 2001 | Socorro | LINEAR | · | 3.7 km | MPC · JPL |
| 297755 | 2001 XX_{80} | — | December 11, 2001 | Socorro | LINEAR | · | 1.1 km | MPC · JPL |
| 297756 | 2001 XJ_{91} | — | December 10, 2001 | Socorro | LINEAR | · | 2.5 km | MPC · JPL |
| 297757 | 2001 XX_{93} | — | December 10, 2001 | Socorro | LINEAR | · | 1.2 km | MPC · JPL |
| 297758 | 2001 XJ_{95} | — | December 10, 2001 | Socorro | LINEAR | · | 1.1 km | MPC · JPL |
| 297759 | 2001 XN_{110} | — | December 11, 2001 | Socorro | LINEAR | · | 3.8 km | MPC · JPL |
| 297760 | 2001 XR_{127} | — | December 14, 2001 | Socorro | LINEAR | EOS | 2.4 km | MPC · JPL |
| 297761 | 2001 XU_{130} | — | December 14, 2001 | Socorro | LINEAR | · | 2.0 km | MPC · JPL |
| 297762 | 2001 XB_{132} | — | December 14, 2001 | Socorro | LINEAR | · | 4.4 km | MPC · JPL |
| 297763 | 2001 XC_{141} | — | December 14, 2001 | Socorro | LINEAR | · | 2.0 km | MPC · JPL |
| 297764 | 2001 XZ_{141} | — | December 14, 2001 | Socorro | LINEAR | (2076) | 1.3 km | MPC · JPL |
| 297765 | 2001 XH_{142} | — | December 14, 2001 | Socorro | LINEAR | · | 900 m | MPC · JPL |
| 297766 | 2001 XF_{151} | — | December 14, 2001 | Socorro | LINEAR | · | 780 m | MPC · JPL |
| 297767 | 2001 XG_{154} | — | December 14, 2001 | Socorro | LINEAR | · | 3.2 km | MPC · JPL |
| 297768 | 2001 XE_{169} | — | December 14, 2001 | Socorro | LINEAR | · | 1.0 km | MPC · JPL |
| 297769 | 2001 XE_{172} | — | December 14, 2001 | Socorro | LINEAR | · | 1.3 km | MPC · JPL |
| 297770 | 2001 XD_{173} | — | December 14, 2001 | Socorro | LINEAR | · | 1.5 km | MPC · JPL |
| 297771 | 2001 XY_{176} | — | December 14, 2001 | Socorro | LINEAR | · | 3.4 km | MPC · JPL |
| 297772 | 2001 XG_{185} | — | December 14, 2001 | Socorro | LINEAR | · | 1.1 km | MPC · JPL |
| 297773 | 2001 XD_{187} | — | December 14, 2001 | Socorro | LINEAR | · | 1.0 km | MPC · JPL |
| 297774 | 2001 XE_{187} | — | December 14, 2001 | Socorro | LINEAR | · | 1.1 km | MPC · JPL |
| 297775 | 2001 XD_{195} | — | December 14, 2001 | Socorro | LINEAR | · | 3.9 km | MPC · JPL |
| 297776 | 2001 XY_{219} | — | December 15, 2001 | Socorro | LINEAR | · | 710 m | MPC · JPL |
| 297777 | 2001 XY_{220} | — | December 15, 2001 | Socorro | LINEAR | · | 3.7 km | MPC · JPL |
| 297778 | 2001 XT_{222} | — | December 15, 2001 | Socorro | LINEAR | KOR | 1.9 km | MPC · JPL |
| 297779 | 2001 XC_{228} | — | December 15, 2001 | Socorro | LINEAR | · | 870 m | MPC · JPL |
| 297780 | 2001 XA_{231} | — | December 15, 2001 | Socorro | LINEAR | · | 3.2 km | MPC · JPL |
| 297781 | 2001 XH_{237} | — | December 15, 2001 | Socorro | LINEAR | · | 1.1 km | MPC · JPL |
| 297782 | 2001 XZ_{241} | — | December 14, 2001 | Socorro | LINEAR | · | 1.8 km | MPC · JPL |
| 297783 | 2001 XB_{246} | — | December 15, 2001 | Socorro | LINEAR | · | 3.2 km | MPC · JPL |
| 297784 | 2001 XT_{249} | — | December 14, 2001 | Socorro | LINEAR | · | 930 m | MPC · JPL |
| 297785 | 2001 XB_{250} | — | December 14, 2001 | Socorro | LINEAR | · | 790 m | MPC · JPL |
| 297786 | 2001 XO_{262} | — | December 13, 2001 | Palomar | NEAT | · | 2.6 km | MPC · JPL |
| 297787 | 2001 YJ_{10} | — | December 17, 2001 | Socorro | LINEAR | · | 1.4 km | MPC · JPL |
| 297788 | 2001 YZ_{12} | — | December 17, 2001 | Socorro | LINEAR | · | 2.6 km | MPC · JPL |
| 297789 | 2001 YR_{14} | — | December 17, 2001 | Socorro | LINEAR | · | 2.4 km | MPC · JPL |
| 297790 | 2001 YG_{17} | — | December 17, 2001 | Socorro | LINEAR | URS | 4.2 km | MPC · JPL |
| 297791 | 2001 YE_{22} | — | December 18, 2001 | Socorro | LINEAR | · | 690 m | MPC · JPL |
| 297792 | 2001 YY_{30} | — | December 18, 2001 | Socorro | LINEAR | · | 860 m | MPC · JPL |
| 297793 | 2001 YB_{47} | — | December 18, 2001 | Socorro | LINEAR | · | 1.1 km | MPC · JPL |
| 297794 | 2001 YC_{58} | — | December 18, 2001 | Socorro | LINEAR | · | 1.5 km | MPC · JPL |
| 297795 | 2001 YO_{76} | — | December 18, 2001 | Socorro | LINEAR | · | 750 m | MPC · JPL |
| 297796 | 2001 YM_{82} | — | December 18, 2001 | Socorro | LINEAR | V | 990 m | MPC · JPL |
| 297797 | 2001 YE_{86} | — | December 18, 2001 | Socorro | LINEAR | · | 1.2 km | MPC · JPL |
| 297798 | 2001 YO_{98} | — | December 17, 2001 | Socorro | LINEAR | HYG | 3.8 km | MPC · JPL |
| 297799 | 2001 YM_{110} | — | December 22, 2001 | Socorro | LINEAR | · | 2.8 km | MPC · JPL |
| 297800 | 2001 YO_{122} | — | December 17, 2001 | Socorro | LINEAR | · | 810 m | MPC · JPL |

== 297801–297900 ==
back to top

| Designation | | | Discovery | | | Properties | | Ref |
| Permanent | Provisional | Named after | Date | Site | Discoverer(s) | Category | Diam. | Ref |
|---|---|---|---|---|---|---|---|---|
| 297801 | 2001 YD_{131} | — | December 17, 2001 | Socorro | LINEAR | · | 1.1 km | MPC · JPL |
| 297802 | 2001 YB_{145} | — | December 17, 2001 | Palomar | NEAT | · | 830 m | MPC · JPL |
| 297803 | 2002 AH_{7} | — | January 9, 2002 | Cima Ekar | ADAS | VER | 3.7 km | MPC · JPL |
| 297804 | 2002 AQ_{27} | — | January 7, 2002 | Anderson Mesa | LONEOS | · | 3.5 km | MPC · JPL |
| 297805 | 2002 AQ_{30} | — | January 9, 2002 | Socorro | LINEAR | · | 770 m | MPC · JPL |
| 297806 | 2002 AQ_{31} | — | January 9, 2002 | Socorro | LINEAR | H | 950 m | MPC · JPL |
| 297807 | 2002 AH_{43} | — | January 9, 2002 | Socorro | LINEAR | · | 3.9 km | MPC · JPL |
| 297808 | 2002 AT_{51} | — | January 9, 2002 | Socorro | LINEAR | · | 3.2 km | MPC · JPL |
| 297809 | 2002 AB_{57} | — | January 9, 2002 | Socorro | LINEAR | NYS | 1.1 km | MPC · JPL |
| 297810 | 2002 AC_{76} | — | January 8, 2002 | Socorro | LINEAR | EOS | 2.8 km | MPC · JPL |
| 297811 | 2002 AY_{79} | — | January 8, 2002 | Socorro | LINEAR | NYS | 1.5 km | MPC · JPL |
| 297812 | 2002 AN_{80} | — | January 8, 2002 | Socorro | LINEAR | THM | 2.7 km | MPC · JPL |
| 297813 | 2002 AP_{87} | — | January 9, 2002 | Socorro | LINEAR | · | 3.6 km | MPC · JPL |
| 297814 | 2002 AP_{93} | — | January 8, 2002 | Socorro | LINEAR | · | 1.1 km | MPC · JPL |
| 297815 | 2002 AF_{98} | — | January 8, 2002 | Socorro | LINEAR | NYS | 1.2 km | MPC · JPL |
| 297816 | 2002 AG_{101} | — | January 8, 2002 | Socorro | LINEAR | · | 3.6 km | MPC · JPL |
| 297817 | 2002 AU_{101} | — | January 8, 2002 | Socorro | LINEAR | · | 1.3 km | MPC · JPL |
| 297818 | 2002 AF_{104} | — | January 9, 2002 | Socorro | LINEAR | · | 1.4 km | MPC · JPL |
| 297819 | 2002 AN_{117} | — | January 9, 2002 | Socorro | LINEAR | · | 5.4 km | MPC · JPL |
| 297820 | 2002 AY_{119} | — | January 9, 2002 | Socorro | LINEAR | · | 1.2 km | MPC · JPL |
| 297821 | 2002 AW_{131} | — | January 8, 2002 | Socorro | LINEAR | · | 4.6 km | MPC · JPL |
| 297822 | 2002 AF_{136} | — | January 9, 2002 | Socorro | LINEAR | · | 2.0 km | MPC · JPL |
| 297823 | 2002 AU_{143} | — | January 13, 2002 | Socorro | LINEAR | · | 6.3 km | MPC · JPL |
| 297824 | 2002 AK_{149} | — | January 14, 2002 | Socorro | LINEAR | V | 1.1 km | MPC · JPL |
| 297825 | 2002 AA_{150} | — | January 14, 2002 | Socorro | LINEAR | EUP | 5.0 km | MPC · JPL |
| 297826 | 2002 AQ_{151} | — | January 14, 2002 | Socorro | LINEAR | · | 4.4 km | MPC · JPL |
| 297827 | 2002 AE_{158} | — | January 13, 2002 | Socorro | LINEAR | · | 5.5 km | MPC · JPL |
| 297828 | 2002 AS_{163} | — | January 13, 2002 | Socorro | LINEAR | · | 1.3 km | MPC · JPL |
| 297829 | 2002 AW_{167} | — | January 13, 2002 | Socorro | LINEAR | · | 4.3 km | MPC · JPL |
| 297830 | 2002 AK_{180} | — | January 12, 2002 | Nyukasa | Nyukasa | ERI | 1.9 km | MPC · JPL |
| 297831 | 2002 AB_{183} | — | January 5, 2002 | Kitt Peak | Spacewatch | · | 1.4 km | MPC · JPL |
| 297832 | 2002 AJ_{186} | — | January 8, 2002 | Socorro | LINEAR | · | 3.2 km | MPC · JPL |
| 297833 | 2002 AG_{190} | — | January 11, 2002 | Kitt Peak | Spacewatch | THM | 2.3 km | MPC · JPL |
| 297834 | 2002 AH_{196} | — | January 12, 2002 | Kitt Peak | Spacewatch | · | 1.3 km | MPC · JPL |
| 297835 | 2002 AL_{202} | — | January 13, 2002 | Socorro | LINEAR | · | 900 m | MPC · JPL |
| 297836 | 2002 AM_{208} | — | January 8, 2002 | Kitt Peak | Spacewatch | · | 1.4 km | MPC · JPL |
| 297837 | 2002 BX | — | January 19, 2002 | Socorro | LINEAR | · | 1.2 km | MPC · JPL |
| 297838 | 2002 BT_{14} | — | January 19, 2002 | Socorro | LINEAR | · | 3.6 km | MPC · JPL |
| 297839 | 2002 BE_{17} | — | January 19, 2002 | Socorro | LINEAR | · | 2.4 km | MPC · JPL |
| 297840 | 2002 BE_{19} | — | January 21, 2002 | Socorro | LINEAR | · | 1.2 km | MPC · JPL |
| 297841 | 2002 BK_{22} | — | January 22, 2002 | Socorro | LINEAR | · | 4.0 km | MPC · JPL |
| 297842 | 2002 BK_{27} | — | January 20, 2002 | Anderson Mesa | LONEOS | EOS | 3.0 km | MPC · JPL |
| 297843 | 2002 BS_{29} | — | January 21, 2002 | Anderson Mesa | LONEOS | AEG | 5.8 km | MPC · JPL |
| 297844 | 2002 CJ_{3} | — | February 3, 2002 | Palomar | NEAT | · | 1.3 km | MPC · JPL |
| 297845 | 2002 CC_{5} | — | February 4, 2002 | Palomar | NEAT | · | 910 m | MPC · JPL |
| 297846 | 2002 CA_{7} | — | February 1, 2002 | Socorro | LINEAR | · | 3.4 km | MPC · JPL |
| 297847 | 2002 CH_{7} | — | February 1, 2002 | Socorro | LINEAR | · | 1.2 km | MPC · JPL |
| 297848 | 2002 CS_{7} | — | February 6, 2002 | Desert Eagle | W. K. Y. Yeung | MAS | 1.2 km | MPC · JPL |
| 297849 | 2002 CR_{8} | — | February 5, 2002 | Palomar | NEAT | · | 3.3 km | MPC · JPL |
| 297850 | 2002 CW_{8} | — | February 5, 2002 | Palomar | NEAT | · | 1.5 km | MPC · JPL |
| 297851 | 2002 CM_{10} | — | February 6, 2002 | Socorro | LINEAR | H | 630 m | MPC · JPL |
| 297852 | 2002 CL_{19} | — | February 4, 2002 | Palomar | NEAT | V | 830 m | MPC · JPL |
| 297853 | 2002 CY_{22} | — | February 5, 2002 | Palomar | NEAT | · | 1.2 km | MPC · JPL |
| 297854 | 2002 CW_{24} | — | February 7, 2002 | Kitt Peak | Spacewatch | · | 1.5 km | MPC · JPL |
| 297855 | 2002 CQ_{25} | — | February 9, 2002 | Socorro | LINEAR | H | 670 m | MPC · JPL |
| 297856 | 2002 CF_{27} | — | February 6, 2002 | Socorro | LINEAR | · | 1.5 km | MPC · JPL |
| 297857 | 2002 CU_{27} | — | February 6, 2002 | Socorro | LINEAR | · | 2.0 km | MPC · JPL |
| 297858 | 2002 CS_{35} | — | February 7, 2002 | Socorro | LINEAR | · | 3.5 km | MPC · JPL |
| 297859 | 2002 CB_{53} | — | February 7, 2002 | Socorro | LINEAR | · | 1.5 km | MPC · JPL |
| 297860 | 2002 CY_{55} | — | February 7, 2002 | Socorro | LINEAR | · | 1.8 km | MPC · JPL |
| 297861 | 2002 CP_{58} | — | February 12, 2002 | Socorro | LINEAR | PHO | 1.7 km | MPC · JPL |
| 297862 | 2002 CY_{68} | — | February 7, 2002 | Socorro | LINEAR | NYS | 840 m | MPC · JPL |
| 297863 | 2002 CF_{73} | — | February 7, 2002 | Socorro | LINEAR | · | 1.2 km | MPC · JPL |
| 297864 | 2002 CN_{75} | — | February 7, 2002 | Socorro | LINEAR | T_{j} (2.98) | 4.2 km | MPC · JPL |
| 297865 | 2002 CA_{77} | — | February 7, 2002 | Socorro | LINEAR | MAS | 1.2 km | MPC · JPL |
| 297866 | 2002 CJ_{78} | — | February 7, 2002 | Socorro | LINEAR | · | 1.3 km | MPC · JPL |
| 297867 | 2002 CM_{86} | — | February 7, 2002 | Socorro | LINEAR | NYS | 1.1 km | MPC · JPL |
| 297868 | 2002 CG_{94} | — | February 7, 2002 | Socorro | LINEAR | ERI | 2.2 km | MPC · JPL |
| 297869 | 2002 CY_{96} | — | February 7, 2002 | Socorro | LINEAR | · | 1.3 km | MPC · JPL |
| 297870 | 2002 CR_{99} | — | February 7, 2002 | Socorro | LINEAR | · | 1.3 km | MPC · JPL |
| 297871 | 2002 CW_{109} | — | February 7, 2002 | Socorro | LINEAR | · | 4.2 km | MPC · JPL |
| 297872 | 2002 CR_{117} | — | February 12, 2002 | Desert Eagle | W. K. Y. Yeung | · | 1.6 km | MPC · JPL |
| 297873 | 2002 CC_{121} | — | February 7, 2002 | Socorro | LINEAR | V | 970 m | MPC · JPL |
| 297874 | 2002 CK_{122} | — | February 7, 2002 | Socorro | LINEAR | · | 1.1 km | MPC · JPL |
| 297875 | 2002 CG_{123} | — | February 7, 2002 | Socorro | LINEAR | · | 1.6 km | MPC · JPL |
| 297876 | 2002 CJ_{125} | — | February 7, 2002 | Socorro | LINEAR | · | 1.6 km | MPC · JPL |
| 297877 | 2002 CS_{129} | — | February 7, 2002 | Socorro | LINEAR | NYS | 1.1 km | MPC · JPL |
| 297878 | 2002 CE_{133} | — | February 7, 2002 | Socorro | LINEAR | · | 1.5 km | MPC · JPL |
| 297879 | 2002 CX_{135} | — | February 8, 2002 | Socorro | LINEAR | · | 1.0 km | MPC · JPL |
| 297880 | 2002 CL_{139} | — | February 8, 2002 | Socorro | LINEAR | · | 1.5 km | MPC · JPL |
| 297881 | 2002 CM_{151} | — | February 10, 2002 | Socorro | LINEAR | · | 850 m | MPC · JPL |
| 297882 | 2002 CL_{152} | — | February 10, 2002 | Socorro | LINEAR | MAS | 900 m | MPC · JPL |
| 297883 | 2002 CP_{152} | — | February 8, 2002 | Socorro | LINEAR | H | 500 m | MPC · JPL |
| 297884 | 2002 CZ_{157} | — | February 7, 2002 | Socorro | LINEAR | · | 1.8 km | MPC · JPL |
| 297885 | 2002 CD_{159} | — | February 7, 2002 | Socorro | LINEAR | · | 1.4 km | MPC · JPL |
| 297886 | 2002 CL_{162} | — | February 8, 2002 | Socorro | LINEAR | · | 5.9 km | MPC · JPL |
| 297887 | 2002 CW_{166} | — | February 8, 2002 | Socorro | LINEAR | V | 990 m | MPC · JPL |
| 297888 | 2002 CK_{173} | — | February 8, 2002 | Socorro | LINEAR | · | 1.5 km | MPC · JPL |
| 297889 | 2002 CS_{176} | — | February 10, 2002 | Socorro | LINEAR | HYG | 2.8 km | MPC · JPL |
| 297890 | 2002 CX_{178} | — | February 10, 2002 | Socorro | LINEAR | HYG | 3.7 km | MPC · JPL |
| 297891 | 2002 CD_{179} | — | February 10, 2002 | Socorro | LINEAR | MAS | 1.0 km | MPC · JPL |
| 297892 | 2002 CF_{191} | — | February 10, 2002 | Socorro | LINEAR | V | 630 m | MPC · JPL |
| 297893 | 2002 CE_{193} | — | February 10, 2002 | Socorro | LINEAR | · | 2.9 km | MPC · JPL |
| 297894 | 2002 CH_{202} | — | February 10, 2002 | Socorro | LINEAR | · | 1.3 km | MPC · JPL |
| 297895 | 2002 CP_{208} | — | February 10, 2002 | Socorro | LINEAR | · | 1.3 km | MPC · JPL |
| 297896 | 2002 CC_{215} | — | February 10, 2002 | Socorro | LINEAR | MAS | 920 m | MPC · JPL |
| 297897 | 2002 CM_{218} | — | February 10, 2002 | Socorro | LINEAR | NYS | 1.4 km | MPC · JPL |
| 297898 | 2002 CW_{236} | — | February 8, 2002 | Socorro | LINEAR | · | 1.6 km | MPC · JPL |
| 297899 | 2002 CK_{239} | — | February 11, 2002 | Socorro | LINEAR | · | 1.5 km | MPC · JPL |
| 297900 | 2002 CV_{241} | — | February 11, 2002 | Socorro | LINEAR | · | 3.4 km | MPC · JPL |

== 297901–298000 ==
back to top

| Designation | | | Discovery | | | Properties | | Ref |
| Permanent | Provisional | Named after | Date | Site | Discoverer(s) | Category | Diam. | Ref |
|---|---|---|---|---|---|---|---|---|
| 297901 | 2002 CB_{265} | — | February 6, 2002 | Palomar | NEAT | · | 1.6 km | MPC · JPL |
| 297902 | 2002 CR_{267} | — | February 7, 2002 | Palomar | NEAT | · | 3.5 km | MPC · JPL |
| 297903 | 2002 CY_{271} | — | February 8, 2002 | Kitt Peak | Spacewatch | THM | 2.3 km | MPC · JPL |
| 297904 | 2002 CU_{275} | — | February 9, 2002 | Palomar | NEAT | · | 5.4 km | MPC · JPL |
| 297905 | 2002 CT_{280} | — | February 8, 2002 | Kitt Peak | M. W. Buie | · | 1.3 km | MPC · JPL |
| 297906 | 2002 CA_{286} | — | February 10, 2002 | Kitt Peak | Spacewatch | V | 1.0 km | MPC · JPL |
| 297907 | 2002 CM_{294} | — | February 10, 2002 | Socorro | LINEAR | LUT | 6.5 km | MPC · JPL |
| 297908 | 2002 CU_{295} | — | February 10, 2002 | Socorro | LINEAR | MAS | 900 m | MPC · JPL |
| 297909 | 2002 CU_{298} | — | February 11, 2002 | Socorro | LINEAR | · | 900 m | MPC · JPL |
| 297910 | 2002 CJ_{310} | — | February 6, 2002 | Palomar | NEAT | · | 6.4 km | MPC · JPL |
| 297911 | 2002 CN_{310} | — | February 7, 2002 | Palomar | NEAT | · | 1.3 km | MPC · JPL |
| 297912 | 2002 CD_{315} | — | February 6, 2002 | Palomar | NEAT | · | 3.0 km | MPC · JPL |
| 297913 | 2002 DD_{2} | — | February 19, 2002 | Socorro | LINEAR | H | 850 m | MPC · JPL |
| 297914 | 2002 DV_{2} | — | February 20, 2002 | Socorro | LINEAR | H | 680 m | MPC · JPL |
| 297915 | 2002 DJ_{3} | — | February 21, 2002 | Socorro | LINEAR | PHO | 1.5 km | MPC · JPL |
| 297916 | 2002 DK_{8} | — | February 19, 2002 | Socorro | LINEAR | · | 3.4 km | MPC · JPL |
| 297917 | 2002 DL_{9} | — | February 19, 2002 | Socorro | LINEAR | H | 670 m | MPC · JPL |
| 297918 | 2002 DX_{15} | — | February 16, 2002 | Palomar | NEAT | T_{j} (2.99) · EUP | 3.4 km | MPC · JPL |
| 297919 | 2002 DP_{18} | — | February 22, 2002 | Palomar | NEAT | H | 650 m | MPC · JPL |
| 297920 | 2002 DJ_{20} | — | February 25, 2002 | Palomar | NEAT | · | 1.3 km | MPC · JPL |
| 297921 | 2002 EM | — | March 5, 2002 | Desert Eagle | W. K. Y. Yeung | · | 2.4 km | MPC · JPL |
| 297922 | 2002 EE_{12} | — | March 14, 2002 | Desert Eagle | W. K. Y. Yeung | PHO | 3.0 km | MPC · JPL |
| 297923 | 2002 EP_{15} | — | March 5, 2002 | Haleakala | NEAT | · | 1.7 km | MPC · JPL |
| 297924 | 2002 ES_{15} | — | March 5, 2002 | Haleakala | NEAT | V | 970 m | MPC · JPL |
| 297925 | 2002 EB_{43} | — | March 12, 2002 | Socorro | LINEAR | · | 1.9 km | MPC · JPL |
| 297926 | 2002 EK_{45} | — | March 10, 2002 | Haleakala | NEAT | · | 1.8 km | MPC · JPL |
| 297927 | 2002 EG_{69} | — | March 13, 2002 | Socorro | LINEAR | · | 1.8 km | MPC · JPL |
| 297928 | 2002 ER_{75} | — | March 14, 2002 | Palomar | NEAT | THB | 3.4 km | MPC · JPL |
| 297929 | 2002 EL_{80} | — | March 12, 2002 | Palomar | NEAT | · | 1.2 km | MPC · JPL |
| 297930 | 2002 EC_{93} | — | March 14, 2002 | Socorro | LINEAR | NYS | 1.5 km | MPC · JPL |
| 297931 | 2002 ER_{95} | — | March 14, 2002 | Socorro | LINEAR | · | 1.7 km | MPC · JPL |
| 297932 | 2002 EK_{105} | — | March 9, 2002 | Anderson Mesa | LONEOS | H | 660 m | MPC · JPL |
| 297933 | 2002 EO_{126} | — | March 12, 2002 | Anderson Mesa | LONEOS | · | 1.9 km | MPC · JPL |
| 297934 | 2002 EO_{127} | — | March 12, 2002 | Palomar | NEAT | · | 1.4 km | MPC · JPL |
| 297935 | 2002 EB_{130} | — | March 12, 2002 | Anderson Mesa | LONEOS | T_{j} (2.98) | 4.2 km | MPC · JPL |
| 297936 | 2002 ER_{131} | — | March 13, 2002 | Kitt Peak | Spacewatch | · | 1.4 km | MPC · JPL |
| 297937 | 2002 EE_{133} | — | March 13, 2002 | Socorro | LINEAR | V | 820 m | MPC · JPL |
| 297938 | 2002 EY_{148} | — | March 15, 2002 | Palomar | NEAT | H | 620 m | MPC · JPL |
| 297939 | 2002 ED_{151} | — | March 15, 2002 | Palomar | NEAT | · | 1.6 km | MPC · JPL |
| 297940 | 2002 EW_{152} | — | March 15, 2002 | Mount Hamilton | Lick Observatory | · | 2.9 km | MPC · JPL |
| 297941 | 2002 EA_{160} | — | March 6, 2002 | Palomar | NEAT | · | 3.8 km | MPC · JPL |
| 297942 | 2002 ET_{161} | — | March 6, 2002 | Palomar | NEAT | · | 1.1 km | MPC · JPL |
| 297943 | 2002 FQ_{6} | — | March 23, 2002 | Nogales | Tenagra II | · | 1.9 km | MPC · JPL |
| 297944 | 2002 FA_{7} | — | March 20, 2002 | Palomar | NEAT | EUP | 3.9 km | MPC · JPL |
| 297945 | 2002 FJ_{7} | — | March 22, 2002 | Palomar | NEAT | · | 3.9 km | MPC · JPL |
| 297946 | 2002 FM_{12} | — | March 16, 2002 | Socorro | LINEAR | MAS | 990 m | MPC · JPL |
| 297947 | 2002 FN_{20} | — | March 18, 2002 | Haleakala | NEAT | · | 1.9 km | MPC · JPL |
| 297948 | 2002 FF_{23} | — | March 17, 2002 | Kitt Peak | Spacewatch | MAS | 770 m | MPC · JPL |
| 297949 | 2002 FM_{26} | — | March 20, 2002 | Palomar | NEAT | TIR | 3.4 km | MPC · JPL |
| 297950 | 2002 FF_{41} | — | March 18, 2002 | Kitt Peak | Spacewatch | · | 1.3 km | MPC · JPL |
| 297951 | 2002 GV_{36} | — | April 2, 2002 | Palomar | NEAT | · | 2.0 km | MPC · JPL |
| 297952 | 2002 GQ_{52} | — | April 5, 2002 | Anderson Mesa | LONEOS | · | 1.7 km | MPC · JPL |
| 297953 | 2002 GC_{63} | — | April 8, 2002 | Palomar | NEAT | NYS | 1.6 km | MPC · JPL |
| 297954 | 2002 GA_{79} | — | April 10, 2002 | Palomar | NEAT | · | 3.6 km | MPC · JPL |
| 297955 | 2002 GS_{110} | — | April 10, 2002 | Socorro | LINEAR | · | 1.6 km | MPC · JPL |
| 297956 | 2002 GC_{115} | — | April 11, 2002 | Socorro | LINEAR | · | 1.9 km | MPC · JPL |
| 297957 | 2002 GT_{121} | — | April 10, 2002 | Socorro | LINEAR | · | 1.3 km | MPC · JPL |
| 297958 | 2002 GF_{126} | — | April 12, 2002 | Palomar | NEAT | · | 1.6 km | MPC · JPL |
| 297959 | 2002 GA_{147} | — | April 13, 2002 | Palomar | NEAT | · | 3.9 km | MPC · JPL |
| 297960 | 2002 GG_{161} | — | April 15, 2002 | Anderson Mesa | LONEOS | · | 2.1 km | MPC · JPL |
| 297961 | 2002 GM_{168} | — | April 9, 2002 | Socorro | LINEAR | · | 2.2 km | MPC · JPL |
| 297962 | 2002 GE_{179} | — | April 2, 2002 | Palomar | NEAT | · | 1.8 km | MPC · JPL |
| 297963 | 2002 GL_{185} | — | April 9, 2002 | Palomar | NEAT | NYS | 1.4 km | MPC · JPL |
| 297964 | 2002 HK_{6} | — | April 19, 2002 | Kitt Peak | Spacewatch | · | 1.3 km | MPC · JPL |
| 297965 | 2002 HH_{11} | — | April 21, 2002 | Palomar | NEAT | EUN | 1.5 km | MPC · JPL |
| 297966 | 2002 HJ_{15} | — | April 17, 2002 | Socorro | LINEAR | CYB | 5.0 km | MPC · JPL |
| 297967 | 2002 HU_{16} | — | April 18, 2002 | Palomar | NEAT | · | 1.7 km | MPC · JPL |
| 297968 | 2002 JP_{20} | — | May 7, 2002 | Palomar | NEAT | · | 2.7 km | MPC · JPL |
| 297969 | 2002 JB_{23} | — | May 8, 2002 | Socorro | LINEAR | · | 1.1 km | MPC · JPL |
| 297970 | 2002 JZ_{30} | — | May 9, 2002 | Socorro | LINEAR | · | 1.7 km | MPC · JPL |
| 297971 | 2002 JM_{53} | — | May 9, 2002 | Socorro | LINEAR | · | 1.8 km | MPC · JPL |
| 297972 | 2002 JN_{54} | — | May 9, 2002 | Socorro | LINEAR | · | 2.6 km | MPC · JPL |
| 297973 | 2002 JX_{55} | — | May 9, 2002 | Socorro | LINEAR | · | 1.9 km | MPC · JPL |
| 297974 | 2002 JU_{104} | — | May 11, 2002 | Socorro | LINEAR | · | 1.9 km | MPC · JPL |
| 297975 | 2002 JX_{104} | — | May 11, 2002 | Socorro | LINEAR | · | 1.8 km | MPC · JPL |
| 297976 | 2002 JK_{122} | — | May 6, 2002 | Socorro | LINEAR | · | 1.7 km | MPC · JPL |
| 297977 | 2002 JE_{146} | — | May 15, 2002 | Socorro | LINEAR | · | 2.5 km | MPC · JPL |
| 297978 | 2002 JC_{149} | — | May 1, 2002 | Palomar | NEAT | · | 1.5 km | MPC · JPL |
| 297979 | 2002 KL_{4} | — | May 16, 2002 | Socorro | LINEAR | EUN | 1.5 km | MPC · JPL |
| 297980 | 2002 KL_{13} | — | May 18, 2002 | Palomar | NEAT | · | 1.6 km | MPC · JPL |
| 297981 | 2002 LE | — | June 1, 2002 | Palomar | NEAT | · | 1.4 km | MPC · JPL |
| 297982 | 2002 LK_{17} | — | June 6, 2002 | Socorro | LINEAR | EUN | 1.6 km | MPC · JPL |
| 297983 | 2002 LL_{20} | — | June 6, 2002 | Socorro | LINEAR | · | 2.1 km | MPC · JPL |
| 297984 | 2002 LW_{39} | — | June 10, 2002 | Socorro | LINEAR | · | 2.0 km | MPC · JPL |
| 297985 | 2002 LX_{40} | — | June 10, 2002 | Socorro | LINEAR | · | 1.9 km | MPC · JPL |
| 297986 | 2002 LW_{61} | — | June 1, 2002 | Palomar | NEAT | · | 2.0 km | MPC · JPL |
| 297987 | 2002 MR_{5} | — | June 20, 2002 | Palomar | NEAT | · | 3.6 km | MPC · JPL |
| 297988 | 2002 MV_{5} | — | June 22, 2002 | Palomar | NEAT | · | 2.2 km | MPC · JPL |
| 297989 | 2002 MJ_{6} | — | June 17, 2002 | Palomar | NEAT | · | 1.8 km | MPC · JPL |
| 297990 | 2002 ND_{7} | — | July 9, 2002 | Palomar | NEAT | · | 2.3 km | MPC · JPL |
| 297991 | 2002 ND_{27} | — | July 9, 2002 | Socorro | LINEAR | slow | 3.1 km | MPC · JPL |
| 297992 | 2002 NG_{37} | — | July 9, 2002 | Socorro | LINEAR | ADE | 2.8 km | MPC · JPL |
| 297993 | 2002 ND_{57} | — | July 14, 2002 | Palomar | S. F. Hönig | · | 2.5 km | MPC · JPL |
| 297994 | 2002 NA_{59} | — | July 14, 2002 | Palomar | NEAT | MIS | 2.6 km | MPC · JPL |
| 297995 | 2002 NN_{59} | — | July 9, 2002 | Palomar | NEAT | EUN | 1.1 km | MPC · JPL |
| 297996 | 2002 NR_{62} | — | July 8, 2002 | Palomar | NEAT | · | 2.4 km | MPC · JPL |
| 297997 | 2002 NK_{64} | — | July 2, 2002 | Palomar | NEAT | EUN | 1.2 km | MPC · JPL |
| 297998 | 2002 NU_{66} | — | July 9, 2002 | Palomar | NEAT | · | 1.7 km | MPC · JPL |
| 297999 | 2002 NF_{71} | — | July 3, 2002 | Palomar | NEAT | · | 2.4 km | MPC · JPL |
| 298000 | 2002 NJ_{74} | — | July 4, 2002 | Palomar | NEAT | · | 1.9 km | MPC · JPL |

back to top

== See also ==
- Meanings of minor-planet names: 297001–298000
