= List of minor planets: 300001–301000 =

The following is a partial list of minor planets, running from minor-planet number 300001 through 301000, inclusive. The primary data for this and other partial lists is based on JPL's "Small-Body Orbital Elements" and data available from the Minor Planet Center. Critical list information is also provided by the MPC, unless otherwise specified from Lowell Observatory. A detailed description of the table's columns and additional sources are given on the main page including a complete list of every page in this series, and a statistical break-up on the dynamical classification of minor planets.

Also see the summary list of all named bodies in numerical and alphabetical order, and the corresponding naming citations for the number range of this particular list. New namings may only be added to this list after official publication, as the preannouncement of names is condemned by the Working Group for Small Bodies Nomenclature of the International Astronomical Union.

Near-Earth obj.	MBA (inner)	MBA (outer)	Centaur
Mars-crosser	MBA (middle)	Jupiter trojan	Trans-Neptunian obj.
Unclassified

== 300001–300100 ==
Designation			Discovery			Properties		Ref
Permanent	Provisional	Named after	Date	Site	Discoverer(s)	Category	Diam.	Ref
300001	2006 UA_{35}	—	October 16, 2006	Kitt Peak	Spacewatch	·	2.6 km	MPC · JPL
300002	2006 US_{35}	—	October 16, 2006	Kitt Peak	Spacewatch	·	2.2 km	MPC · JPL
300003	2006 UK_{37}	—	October 16, 2006	Kitt Peak	Spacewatch	THM	2.3 km	MPC · JPL
300004	2006 UC_{40}	—	October 16, 2006	Kitt Peak	Spacewatch	·	1.8 km	MPC · JPL
300005	2006 UQ_{40}	—	October 16, 2006	Kitt Peak	Spacewatch	·	3.9 km	MPC · JPL
300006	2006 UY_{42}	—	October 16, 2006	Kitt Peak	Spacewatch	·	3.7 km	MPC · JPL
300007	2006 UU_{47}	—	October 17, 2006	Kitt Peak	Spacewatch	·	4.9 km	MPC · JPL
300008	2006 UC_{50}	—	October 17, 2006	Kitt Peak	Spacewatch	EOS	2.9 km	MPC · JPL
300009	2006 UA_{53}	—	October 17, 2006	Mount Lemmon	Mount Lemmon Survey	·	2.7 km	MPC · JPL
300010	2006 UA_{54}	—	October 17, 2006	Mount Lemmon	Mount Lemmon Survey	EOS	2.1 km	MPC · JPL
300011	2006 UC_{68}	—	October 16, 2006	Catalina	CSS	·	3.7 km	MPC · JPL
300012	2006 UN_{68}	—	September 30, 2006	Catalina	CSS	·	2.0 km	MPC · JPL
300013	2006 UG_{72}	—	October 17, 2006	Mount Lemmon	Mount Lemmon Survey	·	2.2 km	MPC · JPL
300014	2006 UG_{73}	—	October 17, 2006	Kitt Peak	Spacewatch	EOS	2.1 km	MPC · JPL
300015	2006 UQ_{73}	—	October 17, 2006	Kitt Peak	Spacewatch	·	3.4 km	MPC · JPL
300016	2006 UO_{74}	—	October 17, 2006	Kitt Peak	Spacewatch	·	2.6 km	MPC · JPL
300017	2006 UU_{78}	—	October 17, 2006	Kitt Peak	Spacewatch	EOS	2.7 km	MPC · JPL
300018	2006 UZ_{79}	—	October 17, 2006	Mount Lemmon	Mount Lemmon Survey	·	2.7 km	MPC · JPL
300019	2006 UU_{84}	—	October 17, 2006	Mount Lemmon	Mount Lemmon Survey	·	1.9 km	MPC · JPL
300020	2006 UM_{85}	—	October 17, 2006	Mount Lemmon	Mount Lemmon Survey	HYG	3.3 km	MPC · JPL
300021	2006 UV_{86}	—	October 17, 2006	Mount Lemmon	Mount Lemmon Survey	HYG	2.8 km	MPC · JPL
300022	2006 UE_{89}	—	October 17, 2006	Kitt Peak	Spacewatch	·	2.6 km	MPC · JPL
300023	2006 UD_{91}	—	October 17, 2006	Kitt Peak	Spacewatch	THM	2.5 km	MPC · JPL
300024	2006 UZ_{91}	—	October 18, 2006	Kitt Peak	Spacewatch	·	1.8 km	MPC · JPL
300025	2006 UL_{92}	—	October 18, 2006	Kitt Peak	Spacewatch	·	2.7 km	MPC · JPL
300026	2006 UO_{97}	—	October 18, 2006	Kitt Peak	Spacewatch	·	2.4 km	MPC · JPL
300027	2006 UK_{98}	—	October 18, 2006	Kitt Peak	Spacewatch	·	2.4 km	MPC · JPL
300028	2006 UT_{98}	—	October 18, 2006	Kitt Peak	Spacewatch	·	3.7 km	MPC · JPL
300029	2006 UM_{100}	—	October 18, 2006	Kitt Peak	Spacewatch	·	3.2 km	MPC · JPL
300030	2006 UX_{101}	—	October 18, 2006	Kitt Peak	Spacewatch	·	2.6 km	MPC · JPL
300031	2006 UC_{107}	—	October 18, 2006	Kitt Peak	Spacewatch	THM	2.4 km	MPC · JPL
300032	2006 UA_{109}	—	October 18, 2006	Kitt Peak	Spacewatch	·	2.3 km	MPC · JPL
300033	2006 UG_{109}	—	October 18, 2006	Kitt Peak	Spacewatch	·	2.9 km	MPC · JPL
300034	2006 UN_{113}	—	October 19, 2006	Kitt Peak	Spacewatch	·	2.0 km	MPC · JPL
300035	2006 UN_{123}	—	October 19, 2006	Kitt Peak	Spacewatch	THM	3.6 km	MPC · JPL
300036	2006 UV_{123}	—	October 19, 2006	Kitt Peak	Spacewatch	·	2.5 km	MPC · JPL
300037	2006 UL_{131}	—	October 19, 2006	Kitt Peak	Spacewatch	·	3.4 km	MPC · JPL
300038	2006 UF_{132}	—	October 19, 2006	Mount Lemmon	Mount Lemmon Survey	·	3.3 km	MPC · JPL
300039	2006 UT_{132}	—	October 19, 2006	Kitt Peak	Spacewatch	·	1.5 km	MPC · JPL
300040	2006 UY_{133}	—	October 19, 2006	Kitt Peak	Spacewatch	·	2.6 km	MPC · JPL
300041	2006 UR_{135}	—	October 19, 2006	Kitt Peak	Spacewatch	·	4.5 km	MPC · JPL
300042	2006 UY_{135}	—	October 19, 2006	Kitt Peak	Spacewatch	·	3.1 km	MPC · JPL
300043	2006 UT_{137}	—	October 19, 2006	Mount Lemmon	Mount Lemmon Survey	EMA	4.2 km	MPC · JPL
300044	2006 UU_{137}	—	October 19, 2006	Mount Lemmon	Mount Lemmon Survey	·	3.8 km	MPC · JPL
300045	2006 UQ_{139}	—	October 19, 2006	Mount Lemmon	Mount Lemmon Survey	·	2.1 km	MPC · JPL
300046	2006 UQ_{140}	—	October 19, 2006	Kitt Peak	Spacewatch	·	2.9 km	MPC · JPL
300047	2006 UB_{141}	—	October 19, 2006	Kitt Peak	Spacewatch	·	2.5 km	MPC · JPL
300048	2006 UC_{141}	—	October 19, 2006	Mount Lemmon	Mount Lemmon Survey	·	3.3 km	MPC · JPL
300049	2006 UB_{142}	—	October 19, 2006	Kitt Peak	Spacewatch	·	2.8 km	MPC · JPL
300050	2006 UX_{166}	—	October 21, 2006	Mount Lemmon	Mount Lemmon Survey	·	3.2 km	MPC · JPL
300051	2006 UU_{169}	—	October 21, 2006	Mount Lemmon	Mount Lemmon Survey	·	1.8 km	MPC · JPL
300052	2006 UW_{169}	—	October 21, 2006	Mount Lemmon	Mount Lemmon Survey	·	2.5 km	MPC · JPL
300053	2006 UG_{172}	—	October 21, 2006	Kitt Peak	Spacewatch	EOS	2.9 km	MPC · JPL
300054	2006 UH_{173}	—	October 22, 2006	Mount Lemmon	Mount Lemmon Survey	THM	2.4 km	MPC · JPL
300055	2006 UQ_{178}	—	October 16, 2006	Catalina	CSS	·	2.1 km	MPC · JPL
300056	2006 US_{181}	—	October 16, 2006	Catalina	CSS	VER	4.1 km	MPC · JPL
300057	2006 UF_{183}	—	October 17, 2006	Catalina	CSS	·	4.9 km	MPC · JPL
300058	2006 US_{184}	—	October 23, 2006	Kitami	K. Endate	·	3.4 km	MPC · JPL
300059	2006 UV_{186}	—	October 19, 2006	Catalina	CSS	·	3.5 km	MPC · JPL
300060	2006 UO_{187}	—	October 19, 2006	Catalina	CSS	·	2.3 km	MPC · JPL
300061	2006 UA_{189}	—	October 19, 2006	Catalina	CSS	·	2.6 km	MPC · JPL
300062	2006 UR_{189}	—	October 19, 2006	Catalina	CSS	·	4.4 km	MPC · JPL
300063	2006 UH_{193}	—	October 20, 2006	Mount Lemmon	Mount Lemmon Survey	AST	2.0 km	MPC · JPL
300064	2006 UJ_{194}	—	October 20, 2006	Kitt Peak	Spacewatch	THM	2.3 km	MPC · JPL
300065	2006 UJ_{196}	—	October 20, 2006	Kitt Peak	Spacewatch	·	3.3 km	MPC · JPL
300066	2006 UM_{200}	—	October 21, 2006	Kitt Peak	Spacewatch	H	580 m	MPC · JPL
300067	2006 UB_{201}	—	October 21, 2006	Kitt Peak	Spacewatch	·	3.8 km	MPC · JPL
300068	2006 UF_{204}	—	October 22, 2006	Palomar	NEAT	EOS	2.7 km	MPC · JPL
300069	2006 UP_{204}	—	October 22, 2006	Palomar	NEAT	EOS	3.1 km	MPC · JPL
300070	2006 UA_{206}	—	October 23, 2006	Kitt Peak	Spacewatch	EOS	2.9 km	MPC · JPL
300071	2006 UU_{206}	—	October 23, 2006	Kitt Peak	Spacewatch	THM	2.4 km	MPC · JPL
300072	2006 UV_{206}	—	October 23, 2006	Kitt Peak	Spacewatch	·	3.7 km	MPC · JPL
300073	2006 UD_{207}	—	October 23, 2006	Kitt Peak	Spacewatch	·	3.7 km	MPC · JPL
300074	2006 UQ_{207}	—	October 23, 2006	Palomar	NEAT	·	5.2 km	MPC · JPL
300075	2006 UV_{208}	—	October 23, 2006	Kitt Peak	Spacewatch	VER	3.1 km	MPC · JPL
300076	2006 UC_{211}	—	October 23, 2006	Kitt Peak	Spacewatch	HYG	2.9 km	MPC · JPL
300077	2006 UC_{214}	—	October 23, 2006	Kitt Peak	Spacewatch	·	5.7 km	MPC · JPL
300078	2006 UV_{214}	—	October 25, 2006	Lulin	Lin, H.-C., Q. Ye	EOS	2.9 km	MPC · JPL
300079	2006 UF_{215}	—	October 26, 2006	Wildberg	R. Apitzsch	EOS	1.6 km	MPC · JPL
300080	2006 UR_{215}	—	October 25, 2006	Piszkéstető	Kelemen, J.	EOS	2.4 km	MPC · JPL
300081	2006 UB_{217}	—	October 29, 2006	Desert Moon	Stevens, B. L.	·	2.3 km	MPC · JPL
300082 Moyocoanno	2006 US_{217}	Moyocoanno	October 25, 2006	Kuma Kogen	Fujita, Y.	·	3.8 km	MPC · JPL
300083	2006 UO_{218}	—	October 16, 2006	Kitt Peak	Spacewatch	URS	4.3 km	MPC · JPL
300084	2006 UF_{223}	—	October 17, 2006	Catalina	CSS	THB	4.3 km	MPC · JPL
300085	2006 UF_{226}	—	October 20, 2006	Palomar	NEAT	·	4.5 km	MPC · JPL
300086	2006 UK_{227}	—	October 20, 2006	Palomar	NEAT	·	2.1 km	MPC · JPL
300087	2006 UX_{228}	—	October 20, 2006	Palomar	NEAT	·	2.5 km	MPC · JPL
300088	2006 UB_{232}	—	October 21, 2006	Mount Lemmon	Mount Lemmon Survey	·	3.1 km	MPC · JPL
300089	2006 UV_{232}	—	October 21, 2006	Palomar	NEAT	EOS	2.7 km	MPC · JPL
300090	2006 UQ_{234}	—	October 22, 2006	Mount Lemmon	Mount Lemmon Survey	HYG	3.6 km	MPC · JPL
300091	2006 UT_{237}	—	October 23, 2006	Kitt Peak	Spacewatch	·	3.2 km	MPC · JPL
300092	2006 UB_{239}	—	October 23, 2006	Kitt Peak	Spacewatch	·	3.1 km	MPC · JPL
300093	2006 UE_{244}	—	October 27, 2006	Mount Lemmon	Mount Lemmon Survey	·	2.3 km	MPC · JPL
300094	2006 UC_{248}	—	October 27, 2006	Mount Lemmon	Mount Lemmon Survey	·	4.6 km	MPC · JPL
300095	2006 UL_{252}	—	October 27, 2006	Mount Lemmon	Mount Lemmon Survey	·	2.1 km	MPC · JPL
300096	2006 UB_{255}	—	October 27, 2006	Mount Lemmon	Mount Lemmon Survey	·	3.2 km	MPC · JPL
300097	2006 UM_{256}	—	October 28, 2006	Kitt Peak	Spacewatch	·	1.9 km	MPC · JPL
300098	2006 UB_{260}	—	October 28, 2006	Mount Lemmon	Mount Lemmon Survey	·	3.1 km	MPC · JPL
300099	2006 UU_{264}	—	October 27, 2006	Mount Lemmon	Mount Lemmon Survey	·	3.6 km	MPC · JPL
300100	2006 UY_{264}	—	October 27, 2006	Mount Lemmon	Mount Lemmon Survey	·	2.9 km	MPC · JPL

== 300101–300200 ==
back to top

Designation			Discovery			Properties		Ref
Permanent	Provisional	Named after	Date	Site	Discoverer(s)	Category	Diam.	Ref
300101	2006 UV_{265}	—	October 27, 2006	Catalina	CSS	·	3.4 km	MPC · JPL
300102	2006 UU_{269}	—	October 27, 2006	Kitt Peak	Spacewatch	H	530 m	MPC · JPL
300103	2006 UW_{269}	—	October 27, 2006	Kitt Peak	Spacewatch	EOS	2.7 km	MPC · JPL
300104	2006 UP_{273}	—	October 27, 2006	Kitt Peak	Spacewatch	·	3.3 km	MPC · JPL
300105	2006 UX_{279}	—	October 28, 2006	Mount Lemmon	Mount Lemmon Survey	THM	2.6 km	MPC · JPL
300106	2006 UV_{282}	—	October 28, 2006	Kitt Peak	Spacewatch	·	3.6 km	MPC · JPL
300107	2006 UY_{285}	—	October 28, 2006	Kitt Peak	Spacewatch	·	4.4 km	MPC · JPL
300108	2006 UO_{286}	—	October 28, 2006	Kitt Peak	Spacewatch	·	3.3 km	MPC · JPL
300109	2006 UW_{321}	—	October 22, 2006	Siding Spring	SSS	·	3.7 km	MPC · JPL
300110	2006 UX_{321}	—	October 25, 2006	Siding Spring	SSS	·	4.4 km	MPC · JPL
300111	2006 UN_{329}	—	October 23, 2006	Catalina	CSS	·	4.0 km	MPC · JPL
300112	2006 UL_{330}	—	October 16, 2006	Apache Point	A. C. Becker	·	3.0 km	MPC · JPL
300113	2006 UV_{331}	—	October 21, 2006	Apache Point	A. C. Becker	·	1.7 km	MPC · JPL
300114	2006 UL_{335}	—	October 17, 2006	Catalina	CSS	EOS	3.1 km	MPC · JPL
300115	2006 UG_{337}	—	October 28, 2006	Catalina	CSS	·	3.2 km	MPC · JPL
300116	2006 UO_{345}	—	October 28, 2006	Mount Lemmon	Mount Lemmon Survey	VER	4.3 km	MPC · JPL
300117	2006 UQ_{346}	—	October 22, 2006	Catalina	CSS	·	2.3 km	MPC · JPL
300118	2006 UH_{359}	—	October 21, 2006	Mount Lemmon	Mount Lemmon Survey	EOS	1.9 km	MPC · JPL
300119	2006 UK_{360}	—	October 27, 2006	Catalina	CSS	·	2.6 km	MPC · JPL
300120	2006 VO_{2}	—	November 3, 2006	Charleston	Astronomical Research Observatory	·	3.3 km	MPC · JPL
300121	2006 VN_{4}	—	November 9, 2006	Kitt Peak	Spacewatch	·	3.8 km	MPC · JPL
300122	2006 VW_{7}	—	November 10, 2006	Kitt Peak	Spacewatch	·	3.9 km	MPC · JPL
300123	2006 VE_{12}	—	November 11, 2006	Mount Lemmon	Mount Lemmon Survey	·	4.1 km	MPC · JPL
300124 Alessiazecchini	2006 VG_{14}	Alessiazecchini	November 14, 2006	Vallemare Borbona	V. S. Casulli	VER	3.2 km	MPC · JPL
300125	2006 VS_{20}	—	November 9, 2006	Kitt Peak	Spacewatch	·	2.8 km	MPC · JPL
300126	2006 VC_{25}	—	November 10, 2006	Kitt Peak	Spacewatch	(21885)	4.3 km	MPC · JPL
300127	2006 VF_{32}	—	November 11, 2006	Mount Lemmon	Mount Lemmon Survey	THM	2.9 km	MPC · JPL
300128 Panditjasraj	2006 VP_{32}	Panditjasraj	November 11, 2006	Mount Lemmon	Mount Lemmon Survey	·	2.4 km	MPC · JPL
300129	2006 VZ_{37}	—	November 12, 2006	Catalina	CSS	·	2.2 km	MPC · JPL
300130	2006 VH_{48}	—	November 10, 2006	Kitt Peak	Spacewatch	·	3.2 km	MPC · JPL
300131	2006 VU_{50}	—	November 10, 2006	Kitt Peak	Spacewatch	·	4.3 km	MPC · JPL
300132	2006 VY_{50}	—	November 10, 2006	Kitt Peak	Spacewatch	EUP	4.4 km	MPC · JPL
300133	2006 VF_{51}	—	November 10, 2006	Kitt Peak	Spacewatch	·	2.2 km	MPC · JPL
300134	2006 VJ_{52}	—	November 11, 2006	Kitt Peak	Spacewatch	·	4.8 km	MPC · JPL
300135	2006 VX_{54}	—	November 11, 2006	Kitt Peak	Spacewatch	·	2.3 km	MPC · JPL
300136	2006 VY_{55}	—	November 11, 2006	Kitt Peak	Spacewatch	·	3.5 km	MPC · JPL
300137	2006 VG_{56}	—	November 11, 2006	Kitt Peak	Spacewatch	THM	2.3 km	MPC · JPL
300138	2006 VS_{58}	—	November 11, 2006	Kitt Peak	Spacewatch	·	3.1 km	MPC · JPL
300139	2006 VU_{58}	—	November 11, 2006	Mount Lemmon	Mount Lemmon Survey	ANF	1.9 km	MPC · JPL
300140	2006 VB_{61}	—	November 11, 2006	Kitt Peak	Spacewatch	·	2.6 km	MPC · JPL
300141	2006 VV_{61}	—	November 11, 2006	Kitt Peak	Spacewatch	THM	2.7 km	MPC · JPL
300142	2006 VW_{61}	—	November 11, 2006	Kitt Peak	Spacewatch	EOS	2.5 km	MPC · JPL
300143	2006 VY_{61}	—	November 11, 2006	Kitt Peak	Spacewatch	THM	2.9 km	MPC · JPL
300144	2006 VW_{62}	—	November 11, 2006	Kitt Peak	Spacewatch	THM	2.4 km	MPC · JPL
300145	2006 VO_{63}	—	November 11, 2006	Kitt Peak	Spacewatch	·	2.6 km	MPC · JPL
300146	2006 VJ_{67}	—	November 11, 2006	Kitt Peak	Spacewatch	·	3.4 km	MPC · JPL
300147	2006 VE_{68}	—	November 11, 2006	Kitt Peak	Spacewatch	THM	2.6 km	MPC · JPL
300148	2006 VX_{73}	—	November 11, 2006	Mount Lemmon	Mount Lemmon Survey	·	4.7 km	MPC · JPL
300149	2006 VU_{80}	—	November 12, 2006	Mount Lemmon	Mount Lemmon Survey	THM	2.7 km	MPC · JPL
300150 Lantan	2006 VN_{81}	Lantan	November 12, 2006	Lulin	H.-C. Lin, Q. Ye	·	3.3 km	MPC · JPL
300151	2006 VR_{84}	—	November 13, 2006	Mount Lemmon	Mount Lemmon Survey	·	3.7 km	MPC · JPL
300152	2006 VO_{85}	—	November 14, 2006	Kitt Peak	Spacewatch	·	1.7 km	MPC · JPL
300153	2006 VP_{85}	—	November 14, 2006	Kitt Peak	Spacewatch	THM	2.7 km	MPC · JPL
300154	2006 VW_{89}	—	November 14, 2006	Kitt Peak	Spacewatch	·	3.2 km	MPC · JPL
300155	2006 VZ_{91}	—	November 15, 2006	Kitt Peak	Spacewatch	·	3.3 km	MPC · JPL
300156	2006 VP_{96}	—	November 10, 2006	Kitt Peak	Spacewatch	·	3.2 km	MPC · JPL
300157	2006 VW_{96}	—	November 10, 2006	Kitt Peak	Spacewatch	HYG	3.4 km	MPC · JPL
300158	2006 VB_{97}	—	November 11, 2006	Kitt Peak	Spacewatch	·	1.8 km	MPC · JPL
300159	2006 VW_{121}	—	November 14, 2006	Mount Lemmon	Mount Lemmon Survey	EOS	2.2 km	MPC · JPL
300160	2006 VV_{126}	—	November 15, 2006	Kitt Peak	Spacewatch	·	4.3 km	MPC · JPL
300161	2006 VU_{131}	—	November 15, 2006	Kitt Peak	Spacewatch	·	4.3 km	MPC · JPL
300162	2006 VG_{135}	—	November 15, 2006	Kitt Peak	Spacewatch	·	3.9 km	MPC · JPL
300163	2006 VW_{139}	—	November 15, 2006	Kitt Peak	Spacewatch	moon · slow · Comet (288P)	2.9 km	MPC · JPL
300164	2006 VE_{140}	—	November 15, 2006	Kitt Peak	Spacewatch	THM	2.2 km	MPC · JPL
300165	2006 VW_{140}	—	November 15, 2006	Kitt Peak	Spacewatch	·	2.4 km	MPC · JPL
300166	2006 VQ_{142}	—	November 14, 2006	Kitt Peak	Spacewatch	·	3.9 km	MPC · JPL
300167	2006 VM_{143}	—	November 15, 2006	Kitt Peak	Spacewatch	·	6.0 km	MPC · JPL
300168	2006 VA_{144}	—	November 15, 2006	Catalina	CSS	·	2.8 km	MPC · JPL
300169	2006 VC_{146}	—	November 15, 2006	Socorro	LINEAR	·	3.2 km	MPC · JPL
300170	2006 VB_{151}	—	November 9, 2006	Palomar	NEAT	·	4.8 km	MPC · JPL
300171	2006 VS_{151}	—	November 9, 2006	Palomar	NEAT	·	5.0 km	MPC · JPL
300172	2006 VS_{168}	—	November 1, 2006	Catalina	CSS	·	2.6 km	MPC · JPL
300173	2006 WT	—	November 17, 2006	Socorro	LINEAR	H	830 m	MPC · JPL
300174	2006 WM_{11}	—	November 16, 2006	Socorro	LINEAR	(6355)	5.8 km	MPC · JPL
300175	2006 WV_{20}	—	November 17, 2006	Mount Lemmon	Mount Lemmon Survey	·	3.5 km	MPC · JPL
300176	2006 WG_{26}	—	November 18, 2006	Kitt Peak	Spacewatch	·	4.2 km	MPC · JPL
300177	2006 WD_{33}	—	November 16, 2006	Kitt Peak	Spacewatch	·	3.6 km	MPC · JPL
300178	2006 WV_{36}	—	November 16, 2006	Kitt Peak	Spacewatch	·	3.7 km	MPC · JPL
300179	2006 WY_{36}	—	November 16, 2006	Kitt Peak	Spacewatch	·	5.2 km	MPC · JPL
300180	2006 WX_{42}	—	November 16, 2006	Kitt Peak	Spacewatch	·	3.6 km	MPC · JPL
300181	2006 WK_{45}	—	November 16, 2006	Mount Lemmon	Mount Lemmon Survey	VER	2.8 km	MPC · JPL
300182	2006 WJ_{53}	—	November 16, 2006	Catalina	CSS	TIR	3.8 km	MPC · JPL
300183	2006 WZ_{58}	—	November 17, 2006	Kitt Peak	Spacewatch	·	4.9 km	MPC · JPL
300184	2006 WK_{61}	—	November 17, 2006	Socorro	LINEAR	·	4.2 km	MPC · JPL
300185	2006 WB_{62}	—	November 17, 2006	Catalina	CSS	TIR	2.9 km	MPC · JPL
300186	2006 WG_{64}	—	November 17, 2006	Mount Lemmon	Mount Lemmon Survey	·	4.8 km	MPC · JPL
300187	2006 WK_{65}	—	November 17, 2006	Mount Lemmon	Mount Lemmon Survey	EOS	2.1 km	MPC · JPL
300188	2006 WD_{70}	—	November 18, 2006	Kitt Peak	Spacewatch	·	3.3 km	MPC · JPL
300189	2006 WU_{71}	—	November 18, 2006	Kitt Peak	Spacewatch	·	2.0 km	MPC · JPL
300190	2006 WV_{75}	—	November 18, 2006	Kitt Peak	Spacewatch	HYG	3.9 km	MPC · JPL
300191	2006 WQ_{86}	—	November 18, 2006	Socorro	LINEAR	·	3.3 km	MPC · JPL
300192	2006 WW_{87}	—	November 18, 2006	Mount Lemmon	Mount Lemmon Survey	LIX	5.4 km	MPC · JPL
300193	2006 WH_{92}	—	November 19, 2006	Kitt Peak	Spacewatch	·	3.1 km	MPC · JPL
300194	2006 WC_{95}	—	November 19, 2006	Kitt Peak	Spacewatch	·	3.8 km	MPC · JPL
300195	2006 WO_{96}	—	November 19, 2006	Kitt Peak	Spacewatch	VER	5.3 km	MPC · JPL
300196	2006 WZ_{96}	—	November 19, 2006	Kitt Peak	Spacewatch	·	2.3 km	MPC · JPL
300197	2006 WX_{99}	—	November 19, 2006	Catalina	CSS	·	3.2 km	MPC · JPL
300198	2006 WH_{100}	—	November 19, 2006	Catalina	CSS	·	2.6 km	MPC · JPL
300199	2006 WK_{100}	—	November 19, 2006	Catalina	CSS	·	3.2 km	MPC · JPL
300200	2006 WS_{100}	—	November 19, 2006	Socorro	LINEAR	VER	3.8 km	MPC · JPL

== 300201–300300 ==
back to top

Designation			Discovery			Properties		Ref
Permanent	Provisional	Named after	Date	Site	Discoverer(s)	Category	Diam.	Ref
300201	2006 WG_{101}	—	November 19, 2006	Socorro	LINEAR	EOS	2.2 km	MPC · JPL
300202	2006 WE_{109}	—	November 19, 2006	Kitt Peak	Spacewatch	THM	2.5 km	MPC · JPL
300203	2006 WE_{111}	—	November 19, 2006	Kitt Peak	Spacewatch	HYG	3.2 km	MPC · JPL
300204	2006 WR_{117}	—	November 20, 2006	Kitt Peak	Spacewatch	·	3.8 km	MPC · JPL
300205	2006 WH_{125}	—	November 22, 2006	Mount Lemmon	Mount Lemmon Survey	·	2.4 km	MPC · JPL
300206	2006 WW_{126}	—	November 15, 2006	Catalina	CSS	·	2.3 km	MPC · JPL
300207	2006 WB_{137}	—	November 19, 2006	Catalina	CSS	·	4.0 km	MPC · JPL
300208	2006 WF_{139}	—	November 19, 2006	Kitt Peak	Spacewatch	·	3.4 km	MPC · JPL
300209	2006 WT_{151}	—	November 21, 2006	Mount Lemmon	Mount Lemmon Survey	·	4.0 km	MPC · JPL
300210	2006 WB_{152}	—	November 21, 2006	Mount Lemmon	Mount Lemmon Survey	·	2.7 km	MPC · JPL
300211	2006 WP_{152}	—	November 21, 2006	Mount Lemmon	Mount Lemmon Survey	·	3.4 km	MPC · JPL
300212	2006 WZ_{153}	—	November 22, 2006	Mount Lemmon	Mount Lemmon Survey	THM	2.1 km	MPC · JPL
300213	2006 WC_{156}	—	November 22, 2006	Mount Lemmon	Mount Lemmon Survey	·	4.1 km	MPC · JPL
300214	2006 WH_{174}	—	November 23, 2006	Kitt Peak	Spacewatch	THM	2.5 km	MPC · JPL
300215	2006 WC_{180}	—	November 24, 2006	Mount Lemmon	Mount Lemmon Survey	·	2.8 km	MPC · JPL
300216	2006 WK_{180}	—	November 24, 2006	Mount Lemmon	Mount Lemmon Survey	·	2.8 km	MPC · JPL
300217	2006 WK_{182}	—	November 24, 2006	Mount Lemmon	Mount Lemmon Survey	(43176)	4.1 km	MPC · JPL
300218	2006 WG_{187}	—	November 23, 2006	Mount Lemmon	Mount Lemmon Survey	EOS	2.6 km	MPC · JPL
300219	2006 WN_{187}	—	November 23, 2006	Mount Lemmon	Mount Lemmon Survey	·	4.1 km	MPC · JPL
300220	2006 WT_{191}	—	November 27, 2006	Kitt Peak	Spacewatch	·	3.6 km	MPC · JPL
300221 Brucebills	2006 XA_{5}	Brucebills	December 10, 2006	Front Royal	Skillman, D. R.	·	3.7 km	MPC · JPL
300222	2006 XF_{6}	—	December 8, 2006	Palomar	NEAT	·	5.0 km	MPC · JPL
300223	2006 XK_{32}	—	December 9, 2006	Kitt Peak	Spacewatch	·	3.0 km	MPC · JPL
300224	2006 XJ_{43}	—	December 12, 2006	Catalina	CSS	VER	4.2 km	MPC · JPL
300225	2006 XN_{44}	—	December 13, 2006	Kitt Peak	Spacewatch	·	4.4 km	MPC · JPL
300226 Francocanepari	2006 XK_{51}	Francocanepari	December 13, 2006	San Marcello	L. Tesi, Fagioli, G.	·	6.2 km	MPC · JPL
300227	2006 XA_{52}	—	December 14, 2006	Socorro	LINEAR	·	5.0 km	MPC · JPL
300228	2006 XN_{54}	—	December 15, 2006	Socorro	LINEAR	·	2.7 km	MPC · JPL
300229	2006 XF_{73}	—	December 15, 2006	Kitt Peak	Spacewatch	·	3.1 km	MPC · JPL
300230	2006 YZ	—	December 16, 2006	Kitt Peak	Spacewatch	·	4.7 km	MPC · JPL
300231	2006 YV_{3}	—	December 16, 2006	Mount Lemmon	Mount Lemmon Survey	·	2.8 km	MPC · JPL
300232	2006 YL_{5}	—	December 17, 2006	Mount Lemmon	Mount Lemmon Survey	HYG	3.3 km	MPC · JPL
300233	2006 YX_{8}	—	December 20, 2006	Palomar	NEAT	LIX	5.3 km	MPC · JPL
300234	2006 YH_{16}	—	December 21, 2006	Mount Lemmon	Mount Lemmon Survey	·	2.1 km	MPC · JPL
300235	2006 YT_{17}	—	December 22, 2006	Mount Lemmon	Mount Lemmon Survey	·	5.0 km	MPC · JPL
300236	2006 YM_{39}	—	December 22, 2006	Kitt Peak	Spacewatch	LIX	4.9 km	MPC · JPL
300237	2006 YD_{45}	—	December 20, 2006	Palomar	NEAT	·	6.1 km	MPC · JPL
300238	2007 CM_{16}	—	February 7, 2007	Mount Lemmon	Mount Lemmon Survey	·	3.0 km	MPC · JPL
300239	2007 CO_{25}	—	February 8, 2007	Mount Lemmon	Mount Lemmon Survey	H	720 m	MPC · JPL
300240	2007 CP_{26}	—	February 9, 2007	Marly	P. Kocher	H	650 m	MPC · JPL
300241	2007 CQ_{60}	—	February 10, 2007	Catalina	CSS	H	820 m	MPC · JPL
300242	2007 DZ_{70}	—	February 21, 2007	Kitt Peak	Spacewatch	L5	7.9 km	MPC · JPL
300243	2007 DE_{117}	—	February 21, 2007	Catalina	CSS	H	680 m	MPC · JPL
300244	2007 EY_{8}	—	March 9, 2007	Mount Lemmon	Mount Lemmon Survey	L5	9.1 km	MPC · JPL
300245	2007 EC_{20}	—	March 10, 2007	Mount Lemmon	Mount Lemmon Survey	·	640 m	MPC · JPL
300246	2007 EE_{96}	—	March 10, 2007	Mount Lemmon	Mount Lemmon Survey	·	660 m	MPC · JPL
300247	2007 EX_{111}	—	March 11, 2007	Kitt Peak	Spacewatch	·	700 m	MPC · JPL
300248	2007 ED_{165}	—	March 15, 2007	Socorro	LINEAR	·	870 m	MPC · JPL
300249	2007 EE_{218}	—	March 9, 2007	Mount Lemmon	Mount Lemmon Survey	L5	8.7 km	MPC · JPL
300250	2007 EF_{222}	—	March 10, 2007	Mount Lemmon	Mount Lemmon Survey	L5	14 km	MPC · JPL
300251	2007 FX_{26}	—	March 20, 2007	Kitt Peak	Spacewatch	·	610 m	MPC · JPL
300252	2007 FN_{32}	—	March 20, 2007	Kitt Peak	Spacewatch	·	770 m	MPC · JPL
300253	2007 GP_{7}	—	April 7, 2007	Mount Lemmon	Mount Lemmon Survey	·	690 m	MPC · JPL
300254	2007 GH_{36}	—	April 14, 2007	Kitt Peak	Spacewatch	·	620 m	MPC · JPL
300255	2007 GT_{47}	—	April 14, 2007	Mount Lemmon	Mount Lemmon Survey	·	650 m	MPC · JPL
300256	2007 GV_{60}	—	April 15, 2007	Kitt Peak	Spacewatch	·	790 m	MPC · JPL
300257	2007 GV_{75}	—	April 15, 2007	Kitt Peak	Spacewatch	·	830 m	MPC · JPL
300258	2007 HT_{4}	—	April 18, 2007	Pises	Pises	·	960 m	MPC · JPL
300259	2007 HJ_{16}	—	April 23, 2007	Tiki	S. F. Hönig, Teamo, N.	·	800 m	MPC · JPL
300260	2007 HJ_{24}	—	April 18, 2007	Kitt Peak	Spacewatch	·	810 m	MPC · JPL
300261	2007 HS_{25}	—	April 18, 2007	Mount Lemmon	Mount Lemmon Survey	·	910 m	MPC · JPL
300262	2007 HQ_{31}	—	April 19, 2007	Kitt Peak	Spacewatch	·	630 m	MPC · JPL
300263	2007 HS_{32}	—	April 19, 2007	Kitt Peak	Spacewatch	·	780 m	MPC · JPL
300264	2007 HO_{35}	—	April 19, 2007	Mount Lemmon	Mount Lemmon Survey	·	1.2 km	MPC · JPL
300265	2007 HF_{81}	—	April 25, 2007	Mount Lemmon	Mount Lemmon Survey	·	690 m	MPC · JPL
300266	2007 HW_{88}	—	April 22, 2007	Kitt Peak	Spacewatch	·	810 m	MPC · JPL
300267	2007 JR_{2}	—	May 7, 2007	Lulin	LUSS	·	760 m	MPC · JPL
300268	2007 JK_{5}	—	May 9, 2007	Mount Lemmon	Mount Lemmon Survey	·	910 m	MPC · JPL
300269	2007 JE_{11}	—	May 7, 2007	Kitt Peak	Spacewatch	·	1.4 km	MPC · JPL
300270	2007 JZ_{16}	—	May 7, 2007	Kitt Peak	Spacewatch	V	670 m	MPC · JPL
300271	2007 JO_{26}	—	May 9, 2007	Kitt Peak	Spacewatch	·	890 m	MPC · JPL
300272	2007 JK_{28}	—	May 10, 2007	Kitt Peak	Spacewatch	·	780 m	MPC · JPL
300273	2007 JJ_{32}	—	May 12, 2007	Kitt Peak	Spacewatch	·	1.2 km	MPC · JPL
300274	2007 JB_{40}	—	May 11, 2007	Mount Lemmon	Mount Lemmon Survey	·	1.2 km	MPC · JPL
300275	2007 KR_{6}	—	May 25, 2007	Mount Lemmon	Mount Lemmon Survey	·	630 m	MPC · JPL
300276	2007 KG_{8}	—	May 19, 2007	Catalina	CSS	·	1.6 km	MPC · JPL
300277	2007 LR	—	June 8, 2007	Kitt Peak	Spacewatch	PHO	930 m	MPC · JPL
300278	2007 LA_{21}	—	June 12, 2007	Kitt Peak	Spacewatch	·	800 m	MPC · JPL
300279	2007 LU_{29}	—	June 15, 2007	Kitt Peak	Spacewatch	·	1.8 km	MPC · JPL
300280	2007 MU_{2}	—	June 16, 2007	Kitt Peak	Spacewatch	·	1.7 km	MPC · JPL
300281	2007 ME_{5}	—	June 17, 2007	Kitt Peak	Spacewatch	·	1.6 km	MPC · JPL
300282	2007 MF_{11}	—	June 21, 2007	Mount Lemmon	Mount Lemmon Survey	V	980 m	MPC · JPL
300283	2007 ML_{23}	—	June 22, 2007	Kitt Peak	Spacewatch	MAS	780 m	MPC · JPL
300284	2007 NX_{2}	—	July 14, 2007	Tiki	S. F. Hönig, Teamo, N.	·	1.2 km	MPC · JPL
300285	2007 OU_{3}	—	July 20, 2007	La Sagra	OAM	·	2.0 km	MPC · JPL
300286 Zintun	2007 OV_{4}	Zintun	July 21, 2007	Lulin	C.-S. Lin, Q. Ye	·	1.9 km	MPC · JPL
300287	2007 OA_{5}	—	March 4, 2006	Kitt Peak	Spacewatch	·	2.3 km	MPC · JPL
300288	2007 OX_{5}	—	July 22, 2007	Lulin	LUSS	·	1.6 km	MPC · JPL
300289	2007 OM_{10}	—	July 18, 2007	Mount Lemmon	Mount Lemmon Survey	CLA	2.0 km	MPC · JPL
300290	2007 PL_{1}	—	August 5, 2007	Pla D'Arguines	R. Ferrando	·	1.5 km	MPC · JPL
300291	2007 PN_{3}	—	August 6, 2007	Lulin	LUSS	NYS	1.5 km	MPC · JPL
300292	2007 PK_{6}	—	August 6, 2007	Reedy Creek	J. Broughton	V	940 m	MPC · JPL
300293	2007 PN_{6}	—	August 7, 2007	Reedy Creek	J. Broughton	·	3.1 km	MPC · JPL
300294	2007 PZ_{7}	—	August 10, 2007	Siding Spring	SSS	·	3.7 km	MPC · JPL
300295	2007 PW_{8}	—	August 6, 2007	Dauban	Chante-Perdrix	·	1.5 km	MPC · JPL
300296	2007 PD_{10}	—	August 8, 2007	Socorro	LINEAR	NYS	1.6 km	MPC · JPL
300297	2007 PG_{10}	—	August 9, 2007	Socorro	LINEAR	·	1.9 km	MPC · JPL
300298	2007 PV_{11}	—	August 8, 2007	Socorro	LINEAR	·	2.1 km	MPC · JPL
300299	2007 PB_{12}	—	August 11, 2007	Socorro	LINEAR	·	2.1 km	MPC · JPL
300300 TAM	2007 PL_{12}	TAM	August 6, 2007	Lulin	Lin, H.-C., Q. Ye	MAS	980 m	MPC · JPL

== 300301–300400 ==
back to top

Designation			Discovery			Properties		Ref
Permanent	Provisional	Named after	Date	Site	Discoverer(s)	Category	Diam.	Ref
300301	2007 PH_{15}	—	August 8, 2007	Socorro	LINEAR	MAS	1.2 km	MPC · JPL
300302	2007 PC_{16}	—	August 8, 2007	Socorro	LINEAR	NYS	1.6 km	MPC · JPL
300303	2007 PM_{18}	—	August 9, 2007	Socorro	LINEAR	·	1.6 km	MPC · JPL
300304	2007 PY_{18}	—	August 9, 2007	Socorro	LINEAR	·	1.7 km	MPC · JPL
300305	2007 PE_{19}	—	August 9, 2007	Socorro	LINEAR	·	1.3 km	MPC · JPL
300306	2007 PA_{20}	—	August 9, 2007	Socorro	LINEAR	·	1.5 km	MPC · JPL
300307	2007 PF_{21}	—	August 9, 2007	Socorro	LINEAR	·	2.0 km	MPC · JPL
300308	2007 PP_{22}	—	August 11, 2007	Socorro	LINEAR	·	1.8 km	MPC · JPL
300309	2007 PQ_{23}	—	August 12, 2007	Socorro	LINEAR	V	850 m	MPC · JPL
300310	2007 PL_{26}	—	August 11, 2007	Siding Spring	SSS	PHO	1.4 km	MPC · JPL
300311	2007 PE_{27}	—	August 9, 2007	Palomar	Palomar	·	1.4 km	MPC · JPL
300312	2007 PR_{28}	—	August 15, 2007	Altschwendt	W. Ries	·	1.9 km	MPC · JPL
300313	2007 PA_{31}	—	August 5, 2007	Socorro	LINEAR	·	3.6 km	MPC · JPL
300314	2007 PL_{32}	—	August 8, 2007	Socorro	LINEAR	MAS	980 m	MPC · JPL
300315	2007 PE_{35}	—	August 9, 2007	Socorro	LINEAR	MAS	960 m	MPC · JPL
300316	2007 PA_{36}	—	August 12, 2007	Socorro	LINEAR	V	790 m	MPC · JPL
300317	2007 PT_{36}	—	August 13, 2007	Socorro	LINEAR	·	2.8 km	MPC · JPL
300318	2007 PN_{44}	—	August 11, 2007	Anderson Mesa	LONEOS	·	1.5 km	MPC · JPL
300319	2007 PE_{45}	—	August 10, 2007	Kitt Peak	Spacewatch	·	1.5 km	MPC · JPL
300320	2007 PW_{49}	—	August 10, 2007	Kitt Peak	Spacewatch	·	2.2 km	MPC · JPL
300321	2007 PK_{50}	—	August 15, 2007	Socorro	LINEAR	·	1.2 km	MPC · JPL
300322	2007 QH_{1}	—	August 16, 2007	Socorro	LINEAR	·	1.7 km	MPC · JPL
300323	2007 QW_{2}	—	August 21, 2007	Goodricke-Pigott	R. A. Tucker	·	2.3 km	MPC · JPL
300324	2007 QZ_{2}	—	August 21, 2007	Hibiscus	S. F. Hönig, Teamo, N.	·	1.9 km	MPC · JPL
300325	2007 QL_{4}	—	August 26, 2007	Suno	Suno	·	1.9 km	MPC · JPL
300326	2007 QX_{5}	—	August 21, 2007	Anderson Mesa	LONEOS	·	1.7 km	MPC · JPL
300327	2007 QL_{6}	—	August 21, 2007	Anderson Mesa	LONEOS	NYS	1.4 km	MPC · JPL
300328	2007 QT_{6}	—	August 21, 2007	Anderson Mesa	LONEOS	NYS	1.5 km	MPC · JPL
300329	2007 QF_{9}	—	August 22, 2007	Socorro	LINEAR	·	920 m	MPC · JPL
300330	2007 RG_{7}	—	September 6, 2007	Dauban	Chante-Perdrix	·	1.4 km	MPC · JPL
300331	2007 RP_{7}	—	September 3, 2007	Catalina	CSS	·	1.4 km	MPC · JPL
300332	2007 RL_{11}	—	September 9, 2007	Marly	P. Kocher	·	1.2 km	MPC · JPL
300333	2007 RG_{15}	—	September 12, 2007	Dauban	Chante-Perdrix	·	2.1 km	MPC · JPL
300334 Antonalexander	2007 RF_{18}	Antonalexander	September 12, 2007	Rimbach	Koenig, M.	·	2.1 km	MPC · JPL
300335	2007 RK_{20}	—	September 2, 2007	Catalina	CSS	·	1.5 km	MPC · JPL
300336	2007 RN_{23}	—	September 3, 2007	Catalina	CSS	·	1.8 km	MPC · JPL
300337	2007 RZ_{27}	—	September 4, 2007	Catalina	CSS	·	2.2 km	MPC · JPL
300338	2007 RJ_{31}	—	September 5, 2007	Catalina	CSS	·	2.1 km	MPC · JPL
300339	2007 RW_{31}	—	September 5, 2007	Catalina	CSS	·	2.5 km	MPC · JPL
300340	2007 RF_{32}	—	September 5, 2007	Catalina	CSS	PHO	1.5 km	MPC · JPL
300341	2007 RT_{34}	—	September 6, 2007	Anderson Mesa	LONEOS	NYS	1.5 km	MPC · JPL
300342	2007 RZ_{37}	—	September 8, 2007	Anderson Mesa	LONEOS	·	1.4 km	MPC · JPL
300343	2007 RF_{41}	—	September 9, 2007	Anderson Mesa	LONEOS	V	900 m	MPC · JPL
300344	2007 RJ_{42}	—	September 9, 2007	Kitt Peak	Spacewatch	·	1.4 km	MPC · JPL
300345	2007 RG_{45}	—	September 9, 2007	Kitt Peak	Spacewatch	·	1.9 km	MPC · JPL
300346	2007 RR_{47}	—	September 9, 2007	Mount Lemmon	Mount Lemmon Survey	·	850 m	MPC · JPL
300347	2007 RV_{48}	—	September 9, 2007	Mount Lemmon	Mount Lemmon Survey	·	1.4 km	MPC · JPL
300348	2007 RP_{49}	—	September 9, 2007	Mount Lemmon	Mount Lemmon Survey	·	1.9 km	MPC · JPL
300349	2007 RR_{50}	—	September 9, 2007	Kitt Peak	Spacewatch	·	1.7 km	MPC · JPL
300350	2007 RB_{52}	—	September 9, 2007	Kitt Peak	Spacewatch	MAR	1.1 km	MPC · JPL
300351	2007 RH_{52}	—	September 9, 2007	Kitt Peak	Spacewatch	KON	2.4 km	MPC · JPL
300352	2007 RH_{55}	—	September 30, 2003	Kitt Peak	Spacewatch	·	1.3 km	MPC · JPL
300353	2007 RG_{57}	—	September 9, 2007	Kitt Peak	Spacewatch	·	1.9 km	MPC · JPL
300354	2007 RV_{57}	—	September 9, 2007	Mount Lemmon	Mount Lemmon Survey	·	1.3 km	MPC · JPL
300355	2007 RP_{65}	—	September 10, 2007	Mount Lemmon	Mount Lemmon Survey	·	1.1 km	MPC · JPL
300356	2007 RU_{68}	—	September 10, 2007	Kitt Peak	Spacewatch	MAS	970 m	MPC · JPL
300357	2007 RM_{69}	—	September 10, 2007	Kitt Peak	Spacewatch	MAS	930 m	MPC · JPL
300358	2007 RL_{76}	—	September 10, 2007	Mount Lemmon	Mount Lemmon Survey	·	1.2 km	MPC · JPL
300359	2007 RY_{76}	—	September 10, 2007	Mount Lemmon	Mount Lemmon Survey	·	1.2 km	MPC · JPL
300360	2007 RV_{86}	—	September 10, 2007	Mount Lemmon	Mount Lemmon Survey	·	1.4 km	MPC · JPL
300361	2007 RO_{87}	—	September 10, 2007	Mount Lemmon	Mount Lemmon Survey	MAS	880 m	MPC · JPL
300362	2007 RX_{89}	—	September 10, 2007	Mount Lemmon	Mount Lemmon Survey	(5)	1.3 km	MPC · JPL
300363	2007 RM_{91}	—	September 10, 2007	Mount Lemmon	Mount Lemmon Survey	EUN	1.3 km	MPC · JPL
300364	2007 RZ_{91}	—	September 10, 2007	Mount Lemmon	Mount Lemmon Survey	·	1.1 km	MPC · JPL
300365	2007 RJ_{102}	—	September 11, 2007	Catalina	CSS	·	1.9 km	MPC · JPL
300366	2007 RO_{108}	—	September 11, 2007	Kitt Peak	Spacewatch	NYS	1.1 km	MPC · JPL
300367	2007 RA_{109}	—	September 11, 2007	Kitt Peak	Spacewatch	NYS	1.2 km	MPC · JPL
300368	2007 RN_{120}	—	September 12, 2007	Catalina	CSS	PHO	1.6 km	MPC · JPL
300369	2007 RO_{122}	—	September 12, 2007	Mount Lemmon	Mount Lemmon Survey	MAS	760 m	MPC · JPL
300370	2007 RE_{126}	—	September 12, 2007	Mount Lemmon	Mount Lemmon Survey	·	1.5 km	MPC · JPL
300371	2007 RS_{130}	—	September 12, 2007	Mount Lemmon	Mount Lemmon Survey	(5)	1.0 km	MPC · JPL
300372	2007 RS_{134}	—	September 12, 2007	Anderson Mesa	LONEOS	·	1.1 km	MPC · JPL
300373	2007 RH_{140}	—	September 13, 2007	Socorro	LINEAR	·	1.6 km	MPC · JPL
300374	2007 RB_{141}	—	September 13, 2007	Socorro	LINEAR	(5)	1.1 km	MPC · JPL
300375	2007 RR_{142}	—	September 13, 2007	Socorro	LINEAR	·	2.3 km	MPC · JPL
300376	2007 RB_{145}	—	September 14, 2007	Socorro	LINEAR	·	2.7 km	MPC · JPL
300377	2007 RM_{145}	—	September 14, 2007	Socorro	LINEAR	MAR	1.4 km	MPC · JPL
300378	2007 RD_{146}	—	September 15, 2007	Socorro	LINEAR	·	2.2 km	MPC · JPL
300379	2007 RX_{148}	—	September 12, 2007	Catalina	CSS	V	1.1 km	MPC · JPL
300380	2007 RQ_{150}	—	September 15, 2007	Mount Lemmon	Mount Lemmon Survey	·	2.4 km	MPC · JPL
300381	2007 RV_{150}	—	September 9, 2007	Anderson Mesa	LONEOS	·	1.6 km	MPC · JPL
300382	2007 RQ_{156}	—	September 10, 2007	Mount Lemmon	Mount Lemmon Survey	MAS	760 m	MPC · JPL
300383	2007 RB_{158}	—	September 12, 2007	Catalina	CSS	NYS	1.5 km	MPC · JPL
300384	2007 RP_{158}	—	September 12, 2007	Catalina	CSS	·	1.6 km	MPC · JPL
300385	2007 RO_{164}	—	September 10, 2007	Kitt Peak	Spacewatch	·	1.3 km	MPC · JPL
300386	2007 RK_{174}	—	September 10, 2007	Kitt Peak	Spacewatch	·	1.6 km	MPC · JPL
300387	2007 RY_{195}	—	September 13, 2007	Catalina	CSS	PHO	2.2 km	MPC · JPL
300388	2007 RT_{196}	—	September 13, 2007	Mount Lemmon	Mount Lemmon Survey	·	1.1 km	MPC · JPL
300389	2007 RL_{202}	—	September 13, 2007	Kitt Peak	Spacewatch	KON	2.0 km	MPC · JPL
300390	2007 RK_{208}	—	September 10, 2007	Kitt Peak	Spacewatch	NYS	1.2 km	MPC · JPL
300391	2007 RB_{216}	—	September 12, 2007	Kitt Peak	Spacewatch	RAF	1.1 km	MPC · JPL
300392	2007 RY_{217}	—	September 13, 2007	Mount Lemmon	Mount Lemmon Survey	·	1.6 km	MPC · JPL
300393	2007 RS_{222}	—	September 14, 2007	Mount Lemmon	Mount Lemmon Survey	·	2.0 km	MPC · JPL
300394	2007 RN_{226}	—	September 10, 2007	Kitt Peak	Spacewatch	·	1.7 km	MPC · JPL
300395	2007 RG_{231}	—	September 11, 2007	Mount Lemmon	Mount Lemmon Survey	·	1.4 km	MPC · JPL
300396	2007 RL_{240}	—	September 14, 2007	Mount Lemmon	Mount Lemmon Survey	·	1.3 km	MPC · JPL
300397	2007 RA_{242}	—	September 13, 2007	Socorro	LINEAR	EUN	1.7 km	MPC · JPL
300398	2007 RK_{253}	—	September 13, 2007	Mount Lemmon	Mount Lemmon Survey	·	2.0 km	MPC · JPL
300399	2007 RW_{256}	—	September 14, 2007	Kitt Peak	Spacewatch	·	1.8 km	MPC · JPL
300400	2007 RV_{258}	—	September 14, 2007	Mount Lemmon	Mount Lemmon Survey	·	2.0 km	MPC · JPL

== 300401–300500 ==
back to top

Designation			Discovery			Properties		Ref
Permanent	Provisional	Named after	Date	Site	Discoverer(s)	Category	Diam.	Ref
300401	2007 RM_{259}	—	January 19, 2005	Kitt Peak	Spacewatch	·	2.2 km	MPC · JPL
300402	2007 RF_{260}	—	September 14, 2007	Mount Lemmon	Mount Lemmon Survey	·	3.5 km	MPC · JPL
300403	2007 RM_{262}	—	September 15, 2007	Kitt Peak	Spacewatch	·	1.4 km	MPC · JPL
300404	2007 RH_{271}	—	September 15, 2007	Mount Lemmon	Mount Lemmon Survey	·	3.2 km	MPC · JPL
300405	2007 RD_{277}	—	September 5, 2007	Anderson Mesa	LONEOS	·	2.1 km	MPC · JPL
300406	2007 RF_{281}	—	September 13, 2007	Catalina	CSS	MAR	1.5 km	MPC · JPL
300407	2007 RN_{284}	—	September 11, 2007	Mount Lemmon	Mount Lemmon Survey	·	900 m	MPC · JPL
300408	2007 RW_{284}	—	September 12, 2007	Mount Lemmon	Mount Lemmon Survey	·	1.2 km	MPC · JPL
300409	2007 RG_{287}	—	September 9, 2007	Mount Lemmon	Mount Lemmon Survey	·	1.1 km	MPC · JPL
300410	2007 RO_{287}	—	September 9, 2007	Mount Lemmon	Mount Lemmon Survey	·	1.6 km	MPC · JPL
300411	2007 RK_{288}	—	September 12, 2007	Catalina	CSS	·	1.4 km	MPC · JPL
300412	2007 RQ_{290}	—	September 10, 2007	Mount Lemmon	Mount Lemmon Survey	·	2.4 km	MPC · JPL
300413	2007 RY_{295}	—	September 15, 2007	Mount Lemmon	Mount Lemmon Survey	·	2.1 km	MPC · JPL
300414	2007 RC_{296}	—	September 9, 2007	Mount Lemmon	Mount Lemmon Survey	·	1.8 km	MPC · JPL
300415	2007 RW_{296}	—	September 15, 2007	Mount Lemmon	Mount Lemmon Survey	KOR	1.5 km	MPC · JPL
300416	2007 RN_{298}	—	September 10, 2007	Kitt Peak	Spacewatch	·	1.7 km	MPC · JPL
300417	2007 RK_{314}	—	September 15, 2007	Anderson Mesa	LONEOS	NYS	1.7 km	MPC · JPL
300418	2007 RQ_{318}	—	September 11, 2007	Kitt Peak	Spacewatch	·	1.4 km	MPC · JPL
300419	2007 RO_{321}	—	September 14, 2007	Socorro	LINEAR	EUN	2.3 km	MPC · JPL
300420	2007 SN_{5}	—	September 11, 2007	Catalina	CSS	·	1.2 km	MPC · JPL
300421	2007 SD_{15}	—	September 21, 2007	Purple Mountain	PMO NEO Survey Program	·	1.7 km	MPC · JPL
300422	2007 SH_{16}	—	September 30, 2007	Kitt Peak	Spacewatch	V	830 m	MPC · JPL
300423	2007 SH_{19}	—	September 18, 2007	Mount Lemmon	Mount Lemmon Survey	MIS	2.5 km	MPC · JPL
300424	2007 SG_{20}	—	September 25, 2007	Mount Lemmon	Mount Lemmon Survey	·	2.4 km	MPC · JPL
300425	2007 TA_{4}	—	October 5, 2007	Pla D'Arguines	R. Ferrando	·	2.2 km	MPC · JPL
300426	2007 TM_{5}	—	October 3, 2007	Hibiscus	Teamo, N.	·	1.9 km	MPC · JPL
300427	2007 TW_{8}	—	October 6, 2007	Bergisch Gladbach	W. Bickel	(5)	1.1 km	MPC · JPL
300428	2007 TX_{11}	—	October 6, 2007	Socorro	LINEAR	·	2.0 km	MPC · JPL
300429	2007 TN_{12}	—	October 6, 2007	Socorro	LINEAR	·	1.6 km	MPC · JPL
300430	2007 TC_{16}	—	October 6, 2007	Charleston	Astronomical Research Observatory	·	2.0 km	MPC · JPL
300431	2007 TP_{16}	—	October 4, 2007	Catalina	CSS	·	1.8 km	MPC · JPL
300432	2007 TT_{17}	—	October 7, 2007	Dauban	Chante-Perdrix	·	2.9 km	MPC · JPL
300433	2007 TX_{21}	—	October 7, 2007	Kitt Peak	Spacewatch	·	3.0 km	MPC · JPL
300434	2007 TR_{28}	—	October 4, 2007	Kitt Peak	Spacewatch	·	1.0 km	MPC · JPL
300435	2007 TT_{32}	—	October 6, 2007	Kitt Peak	Spacewatch	MAS	780 m	MPC · JPL
300436	2007 TF_{34}	—	October 6, 2007	Kitt Peak	Spacewatch	·	830 m	MPC · JPL
300437	2007 TM_{34}	—	October 6, 2007	Kitt Peak	Spacewatch	·	2.0 km	MPC · JPL
300438	2007 TX_{38}	—	October 6, 2007	Kitt Peak	Spacewatch	·	1.8 km	MPC · JPL
300439	2007 TH_{39}	—	September 13, 2007	Mount Lemmon	Mount Lemmon Survey	·	1.9 km	MPC · JPL
300440	2007 TG_{42}	—	October 7, 2007	Mount Lemmon	Mount Lemmon Survey	NYS	1.1 km	MPC · JPL
300441	2007 TO_{43}	—	October 7, 2007	Mount Lemmon	Mount Lemmon Survey	·	2.4 km	MPC · JPL
300442	2007 TQ_{43}	—	October 7, 2007	Mount Lemmon	Mount Lemmon Survey	·	2.0 km	MPC · JPL
300443	2007 TR_{47}	—	October 4, 2007	Kitt Peak	Spacewatch	·	1.8 km	MPC · JPL
300444	2007 TQ_{50}	—	October 4, 2007	Kitt Peak	Spacewatch	MIS	2.2 km	MPC · JPL
300445	2007 TP_{53}	—	October 4, 2007	Kitt Peak	Spacewatch	·	1.7 km	MPC · JPL
300446	2007 TK_{54}	—	October 4, 2007	Kitt Peak	Spacewatch	BRG	1.7 km	MPC · JPL
300447	2007 TV_{54}	—	October 4, 2007	Kitt Peak	Spacewatch	·	2.9 km	MPC · JPL
300448	2007 TO_{55}	—	October 4, 2007	Kitt Peak	Spacewatch	·	2.3 km	MPC · JPL
300449	2007 TW_{59}	—	October 5, 2007	Kitt Peak	Spacewatch	·	1.2 km	MPC · JPL
300450	2007 TJ_{63}	—	October 7, 2007	Mount Lemmon	Mount Lemmon Survey	·	3.5 km	MPC · JPL
300451	2007 TA_{68}	—	October 10, 2007	Goodricke-Pigott	R. A. Tucker	·	1.3 km	MPC · JPL
300452	2007 TY_{70}	—	October 13, 2007	Goodricke-Pigott	R. A. Tucker	·	2.0 km	MPC · JPL
300453	2007 TF_{74}	—	October 8, 2007	Catalina	CSS	·	2.3 km	MPC · JPL
300454	2007 TM_{74}	—	October 13, 2007	Goodricke-Pigott	R. A. Tucker	·	2.2 km	MPC · JPL
300455	2007 TM_{77}	—	October 5, 2007	Kitt Peak	Spacewatch	(5)	1.3 km	MPC · JPL
300456	2007 TQ_{77}	—	October 5, 2007	Kitt Peak	Spacewatch	·	1.0 km	MPC · JPL
300457	2007 TE_{79}	—	October 5, 2007	Kitt Peak	Spacewatch	·	1.4 km	MPC · JPL
300458	2007 TW_{81}	—	October 7, 2007	Mount Lemmon	Mount Lemmon Survey	·	1.6 km	MPC · JPL
300459	2007 TB_{83}	—	October 8, 2007	Mount Lemmon	Mount Lemmon Survey	·	1.6 km	MPC · JPL
300460	2007 TC_{86}	—	October 8, 2007	Mount Lemmon	Mount Lemmon Survey	·	1.7 km	MPC · JPL
300461	2007 TH_{86}	—	October 8, 2007	Catalina	CSS	JUN	1.5 km	MPC · JPL
300462	2007 TK_{86}	—	October 8, 2007	Mount Lemmon	Mount Lemmon Survey	·	2.2 km	MPC · JPL
300463	2007 TL_{86}	—	October 8, 2007	Mount Lemmon	Mount Lemmon Survey	·	1.5 km	MPC · JPL
300464	2007 TG_{87}	—	October 8, 2007	Mount Lemmon	Mount Lemmon Survey	·	1.4 km	MPC · JPL
300465	2007 TN_{94}	—	October 7, 2007	Catalina	CSS	·	2.9 km	MPC · JPL
300466	2007 TC_{97}	—	October 8, 2007	Mount Lemmon	Mount Lemmon Survey	·	1.0 km	MPC · JPL
300467	2007 TW_{98}	—	October 8, 2007	Mount Lemmon	Mount Lemmon Survey	·	1.6 km	MPC · JPL
300468	2007 TP_{107}	—	October 4, 2007	Kitt Peak	Spacewatch	·	2.0 km	MPC · JPL
300469	2007 TQ_{107}	—	October 4, 2007	Catalina	CSS	·	1.9 km	MPC · JPL
300470	2007 TN_{112}	—	October 8, 2007	Catalina	CSS	·	1.4 km	MPC · JPL
300471	2007 TR_{113}	—	October 8, 2007	Anderson Mesa	LONEOS	·	1.9 km	MPC · JPL
300472	2007 TE_{114}	—	October 8, 2007	Catalina	CSS	EUN	2.1 km	MPC · JPL
300473	2007 TK_{114}	—	October 8, 2007	Catalina	CSS	ADE	3.3 km	MPC · JPL
300474	2007 TW_{114}	—	October 8, 2007	Kitt Peak	Spacewatch	·	2.1 km	MPC · JPL
300475	2007 TO_{116}	—	October 9, 2007	Kitt Peak	Spacewatch	·	1.3 km	MPC · JPL
300476	2007 TG_{117}	—	October 9, 2007	Kitt Peak	Spacewatch	·	1.4 km	MPC · JPL
300477	2007 TV_{119}	—	October 9, 2007	Mount Lemmon	Mount Lemmon Survey	BRA	2.0 km	MPC · JPL
300478	2007 TT_{120}	—	October 4, 2007	Kitt Peak	Spacewatch	·	1.8 km	MPC · JPL
300479	2007 TG_{123}	—	October 6, 2007	Kitt Peak	Spacewatch	EUN	1.6 km	MPC · JPL
300480	2007 TH_{125}	—	October 6, 2007	Kitt Peak	Spacewatch	·	1.5 km	MPC · JPL
300481	2007 TA_{126}	—	October 6, 2007	Kitt Peak	Spacewatch	·	1.9 km	MPC · JPL
300482	2007 TB_{126}	—	October 6, 2007	Kitt Peak	Spacewatch	·	2.1 km	MPC · JPL
300483	2007 TC_{127}	—	October 6, 2007	Kitt Peak	Spacewatch	MIS	2.6 km	MPC · JPL
300484	2007 TV_{127}	—	October 6, 2007	Kitt Peak	Spacewatch	·	1.7 km	MPC · JPL
300485	2007 TK_{129}	—	October 6, 2007	Kitt Peak	Spacewatch	·	2.0 km	MPC · JPL
300486	2007 TK_{130}	—	October 6, 2007	Purple Mountain	PMO NEO Survey Program	·	1.3 km	MPC · JPL
300487	2007 TT_{131}	—	October 7, 2007	Mount Lemmon	Mount Lemmon Survey	·	1.1 km	MPC · JPL
300488	2007 TZ_{132}	—	October 7, 2007	Mount Lemmon	Mount Lemmon Survey	NEM	2.6 km	MPC · JPL
300489	2007 TJ_{133}	—	October 7, 2007	Mount Lemmon	Mount Lemmon Survey	·	1.6 km	MPC · JPL
300490	2007 TZ_{134}	—	October 8, 2007	Kitt Peak	Spacewatch	·	1.7 km	MPC · JPL
300491	2007 TQ_{142}	—	October 13, 2007	Dauban	Chante-Perdrix	·	2.2 km	MPC · JPL
300492	2007 TE_{143}	—	October 9, 2007	Purple Mountain	PMO NEO Survey Program	RAF	1.2 km	MPC · JPL
300493	2007 TF_{145}	—	October 6, 2007	Socorro	LINEAR	(5)	1.2 km	MPC · JPL
300494	2007 TK_{153}	—	October 9, 2007	Socorro	LINEAR	·	2.7 km	MPC · JPL
300495	2007 TE_{155}	—	October 9, 2007	Socorro	LINEAR	·	1.9 km	MPC · JPL
300496	2007 TL_{155}	—	October 9, 2007	Socorro	LINEAR	·	1.7 km	MPC · JPL
300497	2007 TW_{157}	—	October 9, 2007	Socorro	LINEAR	(5)	1.5 km	MPC · JPL
300498	2007 TM_{158}	—	October 9, 2007	Socorro	LINEAR	·	2.3 km	MPC · JPL
300499	2007 TU_{158}	—	October 9, 2007	Socorro	LINEAR	·	2.5 km	MPC · JPL
300500	2007 TO_{160}	—	October 9, 2007	Socorro	LINEAR	·	1.1 km	MPC · JPL

== 300501–300600 ==
back to top

Designation			Discovery			Properties		Ref
Permanent	Provisional	Named after	Date	Site	Discoverer(s)	Category	Diam.	Ref
300501	2007 TN_{161}	—	October 4, 2007	Catalina	CSS	·	1.8 km	MPC · JPL
300502	2007 TW_{161}	—	October 11, 2007	Socorro	LINEAR	·	1.2 km	MPC · JPL
300503	2007 TB_{165}	—	October 11, 2007	Socorro	LINEAR	·	1.4 km	MPC · JPL
300504	2007 TW_{165}	—	October 11, 2007	Socorro	LINEAR	·	1.7 km	MPC · JPL
300505	2007 TJ_{172}	—	October 13, 2007	Socorro	LINEAR	·	1.6 km	MPC · JPL
300506	2007 TH_{173}	—	October 4, 2007	Kitt Peak	Spacewatch	·	1.8 km	MPC · JPL
300507	2007 TJ_{174}	—	October 4, 2007	Kitt Peak	Spacewatch	·	1.8 km	MPC · JPL
300508	2007 TV_{175}	—	October 4, 2007	Purple Mountain	PMO NEO Survey Program	·	1.9 km	MPC · JPL
300509	2007 TG_{178}	—	October 6, 2007	Purple Mountain	PMO NEO Survey Program	EUN	1.8 km	MPC · JPL
300510	2007 TZ_{182}	—	October 8, 2007	Mount Lemmon	Mount Lemmon Survey	·	1.7 km	MPC · JPL
300511	2007 TP_{183}	—	October 9, 2007	Kitt Peak	Spacewatch	·	1.5 km	MPC · JPL
300512	2007 TH_{186}	—	October 13, 2007	Socorro	LINEAR	·	1.5 km	MPC · JPL
300513	2007 TJ_{186}	—	October 13, 2007	Socorro	LINEAR	·	2.9 km	MPC · JPL
300514	2007 TU_{187}	—	October 14, 2007	Socorro	LINEAR	·	1.9 km	MPC · JPL
300515	2007 TF_{190}	—	October 4, 2007	Mount Lemmon	Mount Lemmon Survey	NYS	1.2 km	MPC · JPL
300516	2007 TG_{193}	—	October 6, 2007	Kitt Peak	Spacewatch	EUN	1.3 km	MPC · JPL
300517	2007 TH_{196}	—	October 7, 2007	Mount Lemmon	Mount Lemmon Survey	AGN	1.2 km	MPC · JPL
300518	2007 TD_{205}	—	October 8, 2007	Mount Lemmon	Mount Lemmon Survey	·	2.2 km	MPC · JPL
300519	2007 TK_{210}	—	October 5, 2007	Kitt Peak	Spacewatch	·	4.0 km	MPC · JPL
300520	2007 TW_{212}	—	October 7, 2007	Kitt Peak	Spacewatch	·	2.0 km	MPC · JPL
300521	2007 TA_{213}	—	October 7, 2007	Kitt Peak	Spacewatch	NEM	2.1 km	MPC · JPL
300522	2007 TV_{213}	—	October 7, 2007	Kitt Peak	Spacewatch	EUN	1.9 km	MPC · JPL
300523	2007 TH_{214}	—	October 7, 2007	Kitt Peak	Spacewatch	·	1.9 km	MPC · JPL
300524	2007 TX_{214}	—	October 7, 2007	Kitt Peak	Spacewatch	·	1.6 km	MPC · JPL
300525	2007 TZ_{214}	—	October 7, 2007	Kitt Peak	Spacewatch	·	1.7 km	MPC · JPL
300526	2007 TS_{215}	—	October 7, 2007	Kitt Peak	Spacewatch	·	2.4 km	MPC · JPL
300527	2007 TA_{221}	—	October 9, 2007	Mount Lemmon	Mount Lemmon Survey	·	1.9 km	MPC · JPL
300528	2007 TY_{222}	—	October 10, 2007	Kitt Peak	Spacewatch	·	1.5 km	MPC · JPL
300529	2007 TH_{225}	—	October 4, 2007	Kitt Peak	Spacewatch	EUN	1.5 km	MPC · JPL
300530	2007 TB_{226}	—	October 8, 2007	Kitt Peak	Spacewatch	·	1.6 km	MPC · JPL
300531	2007 TN_{226}	—	October 8, 2007	Kitt Peak	Spacewatch	·	2.0 km	MPC · JPL
300532	2007 TA_{228}	—	October 8, 2007	Kitt Peak	Spacewatch	·	1.5 km	MPC · JPL
300533	2007 TO_{230}	—	October 8, 2007	Kitt Peak	Spacewatch	WIT	1.2 km	MPC · JPL
300534	2007 TB_{237}	—	October 9, 2007	Mount Lemmon	Mount Lemmon Survey	·	1.8 km	MPC · JPL
300535	2007 TC_{238}	—	October 10, 2007	Kitt Peak	Spacewatch	·	1.2 km	MPC · JPL
300536	2007 TZ_{238}	—	October 10, 2007	Mount Lemmon	Mount Lemmon Survey	·	2.7 km	MPC · JPL
300537	2007 TZ_{243}	—	October 8, 2007	Catalina	CSS	·	1.9 km	MPC · JPL
300538	2007 TQ_{244}	—	October 8, 2007	Catalina	CSS	·	2.0 km	MPC · JPL
300539	2007 TP_{246}	—	October 9, 2007	Catalina	CSS	JUN	1.5 km	MPC · JPL
300540	2007 TD_{253}	—	October 8, 2007	Mount Lemmon	Mount Lemmon Survey	·	790 m	MPC · JPL
300541	2007 TW_{255}	—	October 10, 2007	Kitt Peak	Spacewatch	·	1.9 km	MPC · JPL
300542	2007 TQ_{257}	—	October 10, 2007	Kitt Peak	Spacewatch	·	1.2 km	MPC · JPL
300543	2007 TU_{260}	—	October 10, 2007	Kitt Peak	Spacewatch	·	2.1 km	MPC · JPL
300544	2007 TL_{261}	—	October 10, 2007	Kitt Peak	Spacewatch	·	2.5 km	MPC · JPL
300545	2007 TK_{262}	—	October 10, 2007	Kitt Peak	Spacewatch	·	1.4 km	MPC · JPL
300546	2007 TB_{263}	—	October 10, 2007	Kitt Peak	Spacewatch	·	2.0 km	MPC · JPL
300547	2007 TD_{263}	—	October 10, 2007	Kitt Peak	Spacewatch	·	2.4 km	MPC · JPL
300548	2007 TN_{266}	—	October 9, 2007	Kitt Peak	Spacewatch	·	1.7 km	MPC · JPL
300549	2007 TS_{266}	—	October 9, 2007	Kitt Peak	Spacewatch	·	1.8 km	MPC · JPL
300550	2007 TJ_{270}	—	October 9, 2007	Kitt Peak	Spacewatch	EUN	1.2 km	MPC · JPL
300551	2007 TL_{271}	—	October 9, 2007	Kitt Peak	Spacewatch	·	1.6 km	MPC · JPL
300552	2007 TP_{272}	—	October 9, 2007	Kitt Peak	Spacewatch	·	1.7 km	MPC · JPL
300553	2007 TT_{272}	—	October 9, 2007	Kitt Peak	Spacewatch	(5)	1.1 km	MPC · JPL
300554	2007 TC_{276}	—	October 11, 2007	Mount Lemmon	Mount Lemmon Survey	·	1.7 km	MPC · JPL
300555	2007 TA_{293}	—	October 8, 2007	Mount Lemmon	Mount Lemmon Survey	MIS	2.7 km	MPC · JPL
300556	2007 TN_{296}	—	October 10, 2007	Mount Lemmon	Mount Lemmon Survey	·	2.2 km	MPC · JPL
300557	2007 TC_{298}	—	October 11, 2007	Mount Lemmon	Mount Lemmon Survey	·	1.4 km	MPC · JPL
300558	2007 TB_{299}	—	October 12, 2007	Kitt Peak	Spacewatch	(5)	1.4 km	MPC · JPL
300559	2007 TT_{302}	—	October 12, 2007	Kitt Peak	Spacewatch	·	1.4 km	MPC · JPL
300560	2007 TQ_{319}	—	October 12, 2007	Kitt Peak	Spacewatch	·	1.5 km	MPC · JPL
300561	2007 TH_{320}	—	October 13, 2007	Catalina	CSS	·	1.0 km	MPC · JPL
300562	2007 TS_{326}	—	October 11, 2007	Kitt Peak	Spacewatch	·	2.1 km	MPC · JPL
300563	2007 TF_{327}	—	October 11, 2007	Kitt Peak	Spacewatch	·	2.6 km	MPC · JPL
300564	2007 TO_{327}	—	October 11, 2007	Kitt Peak	Spacewatch	·	1.5 km	MPC · JPL
300565	2007 TG_{331}	—	October 11, 2007	Kitt Peak	Spacewatch	·	1.9 km	MPC · JPL
300566	2007 TU_{331}	—	October 11, 2007	Kitt Peak	Spacewatch	AGN	1.2 km	MPC · JPL
300567	2007 TU_{333}	—	October 11, 2007	Kitt Peak	Spacewatch	·	2.0 km	MPC · JPL
300568	2007 TS_{336}	—	October 12, 2007	Kitt Peak	Spacewatch	SUL	2.1 km	MPC · JPL
300569	2007 TP_{337}	—	October 13, 2007	Catalina	CSS	·	1.7 km	MPC · JPL
300570	2007 TA_{338}	—	October 13, 2007	Catalina	CSS	·	1.3 km	MPC · JPL
300571	2007 TH_{342}	—	October 9, 2007	Mount Lemmon	Mount Lemmon Survey	·	2.1 km	MPC · JPL
300572	2007 TG_{344}	—	October 10, 2007	Mount Lemmon	Mount Lemmon Survey	·	1.4 km	MPC · JPL
300573	2007 TX_{353}	—	October 10, 2007	Kitt Peak	Spacewatch	WIT	1.2 km	MPC · JPL
300574	2007 TM_{360}	—	October 14, 2007	Mount Lemmon	Mount Lemmon Survey	·	2.5 km	MPC · JPL
300575	2007 TG_{361}	—	October 14, 2007	Mount Lemmon	Mount Lemmon Survey	·	2.7 km	MPC · JPL
300576	2007 TB_{363}	—	October 14, 2007	Mount Lemmon	Mount Lemmon Survey	·	1.8 km	MPC · JPL
300577	2007 TA_{367}	—	October 9, 2007	Kitt Peak	Spacewatch	·	2.8 km	MPC · JPL
300578	2007 TF_{367}	—	October 10, 2007	Mount Lemmon	Mount Lemmon Survey	·	1.3 km	MPC · JPL
300579	2007 TG_{368}	—	October 10, 2007	Mount Lemmon	Mount Lemmon Survey	·	1.6 km	MPC · JPL
300580	2007 TA_{371}	—	October 12, 2007	Mount Lemmon	Mount Lemmon Survey	NEM	2.5 km	MPC · JPL
300581	2007 TD_{372}	—	October 13, 2007	Mount Lemmon	Mount Lemmon Survey	·	2.4 km	MPC · JPL
300582	2007 TT_{373}	—	October 14, 2007	Kitt Peak	Spacewatch	·	2.4 km	MPC · JPL
300583	2007 TM_{385}	—	October 15, 2007	Catalina	CSS	·	2.1 km	MPC · JPL
300584	2007 TC_{386}	—	October 15, 2007	Catalina	CSS	EUN	1.7 km	MPC · JPL
300585	2007 TL_{388}	—	October 13, 2007	Mount Lemmon	Mount Lemmon Survey	·	1.7 km	MPC · JPL
300586	2007 TW_{388}	—	October 13, 2007	Catalina	CSS	·	1.3 km	MPC · JPL
300587	2007 TJ_{393}	—	October 13, 2007	Kitt Peak	Spacewatch	·	1.9 km	MPC · JPL
300588	2007 TD_{398}	—	October 15, 2007	Kitt Peak	Spacewatch	·	2.0 km	MPC · JPL
300589	2007 TQ_{398}	—	October 15, 2007	Mount Lemmon	Mount Lemmon Survey	·	1.7 km	MPC · JPL
300590	2007 TE_{404}	—	October 15, 2007	Kitt Peak	Spacewatch	(5)	1.2 km	MPC · JPL
300591	2007 TA_{405}	—	October 15, 2007	Kitt Peak	Spacewatch	·	2.0 km	MPC · JPL
300592	2007 TM_{411}	—	October 13, 2007	Catalina	CSS	EUN	1.6 km	MPC · JPL
300593	2007 TF_{412}	—	October 14, 2007	Catalina	CSS	·	2.7 km	MPC · JPL
300594	2007 TN_{418}	—	October 4, 2007	Kitt Peak	Spacewatch	AGN	1.2 km	MPC · JPL
300595	2007 TK_{419}	—	October 13, 2007	Kitt Peak	Spacewatch	·	1.4 km	MPC · JPL
300596	2007 TN_{419}	—	October 14, 2007	Mount Lemmon	Mount Lemmon Survey	·	1.9 km	MPC · JPL
300597	2007 TD_{421}	—	October 11, 2007	Catalina	CSS	MAR	1.5 km	MPC · JPL
300598	2007 TA_{426}	—	October 9, 2007	Kitt Peak	Spacewatch	·	1.6 km	MPC · JPL
300599	2007 TW_{430}	—	October 15, 2007	Mount Lemmon	Mount Lemmon Survey	(16286)	3.1 km	MPC · JPL
300600	2007 TX_{430}	—	October 15, 2007	Mount Lemmon	Mount Lemmon Survey	EOS	2.5 km	MPC · JPL

== 300601–300700 ==
back to top

Designation			Discovery			Properties		Ref
Permanent	Provisional	Named after	Date	Site	Discoverer(s)	Category	Diam.	Ref
300601	2007 TO_{432}	—	October 6, 2007	Kitt Peak	Spacewatch	·	1.8 km	MPC · JPL
300602	2007 TE_{434}	—	October 7, 2007	Kitt Peak	Spacewatch	·	1.3 km	MPC · JPL
300603	2007 TB_{435}	—	October 9, 2007	Catalina	CSS	MAR	1.8 km	MPC · JPL
300604	2007 TJ_{436}	—	October 4, 2007	Catalina	CSS	·	2.1 km	MPC · JPL
300605	2007 TF_{438}	—	October 4, 2007	Kitt Peak	Spacewatch	·	1.5 km	MPC · JPL
300606	2007 TO_{439}	—	October 4, 2007	Kitt Peak	Spacewatch	·	1.2 km	MPC · JPL
300607	2007 TA_{441}	—	October 10, 2007	Catalina	CSS	KON	2.4 km	MPC · JPL
300608	2007 TT_{441}	—	October 8, 2007	Kitt Peak	Spacewatch	·	1.4 km	MPC · JPL
300609	2007 TE_{445}	—	October 12, 2007	Socorro	LINEAR	·	2.0 km	MPC · JPL
300610	2007 TP_{448}	—	October 8, 2007	Mount Lemmon	Mount Lemmon Survey	·	1.4 km	MPC · JPL
300611	2007 TB_{452}	—	October 14, 2007	Mount Lemmon	Mount Lemmon Survey	·	1.8 km	MPC · JPL
300612	2007 UJ_{1}	—	October 16, 2007	Bisei SG Center	BATTeRS	·	2.4 km	MPC · JPL
300613	2007 UP_{5}	—	October 20, 2007	Bisei SG Center	BATTeRS	·	1.7 km	MPC · JPL
300614	2007 UL_{9}	—	October 17, 2007	Anderson Mesa	LONEOS	·	2.4 km	MPC · JPL
300615	2007 UJ_{11}	—	October 19, 2007	Socorro	LINEAR	·	1.7 km	MPC · JPL
300616	2007 UU_{11}	—	October 19, 2007	Socorro	LINEAR	·	2.3 km	MPC · JPL
300617	2007 UV_{11}	—	October 19, 2007	Socorro	LINEAR	·	2.1 km	MPC · JPL
300618	2007 UA_{16}	—	October 18, 2007	Mount Lemmon	Mount Lemmon Survey	·	1.7 km	MPC · JPL
300619	2007 UL_{20}	—	October 18, 2007	Mount Lemmon	Mount Lemmon Survey	·	1.6 km	MPC · JPL
300620	2007 US_{22}	—	October 16, 2007	Kitt Peak	Spacewatch	·	1.7 km	MPC · JPL
300621	2007 UL_{26}	—	October 19, 2007	Anderson Mesa	LONEOS	(5)	1.7 km	MPC · JPL
300622	2007 UW_{28}	—	October 17, 2007	Mount Lemmon	Mount Lemmon Survey	·	2.2 km	MPC · JPL
300623	2007 UG_{33}	—	October 16, 2007	Catalina	CSS	·	2.6 km	MPC · JPL
300624	2007 UR_{33}	—	October 16, 2007	Catalina	CSS	(194)	3.0 km	MPC · JPL
300625	2007 UW_{36}	—	October 19, 2007	Catalina	CSS	·	1.7 km	MPC · JPL
300626	2007 UR_{37}	—	March 17, 2005	Kitt Peak	Spacewatch	HNS	1.4 km	MPC · JPL
300627	2007 UE_{38}	—	September 10, 2007	Mount Lemmon	Mount Lemmon Survey	·	2.5 km	MPC · JPL
300628	2007 UX_{39}	—	October 20, 2007	Mount Lemmon	Mount Lemmon Survey	·	1.8 km	MPC · JPL
300629	2007 UE_{41}	—	October 16, 2007	Kitt Peak	Spacewatch	·	1.3 km	MPC · JPL
300630	2007 UJ_{42}	—	January 11, 2000	Kitt Peak	Spacewatch	·	1.9 km	MPC · JPL
300631	2007 UM_{43}	—	October 18, 2007	Kitt Peak	Spacewatch	·	1.5 km	MPC · JPL
300632	2007 UB_{47}	—	October 20, 2007	Catalina	CSS	·	1.8 km	MPC · JPL
300633	2007 UO_{47}	—	October 19, 2007	Anderson Mesa	LONEOS	·	4.2 km	MPC · JPL
300634 Chuwenshin	2007 UT_{47}	Chuwenshin	October 19, 2007	Lulin	C.-S. Lin, Q. Ye	·	1.9 km	MPC · JPL
300635	2007 UN_{54}	—	October 30, 2007	Kitt Peak	Spacewatch	·	1.8 km	MPC · JPL
300636	2007 UT_{55}	—	October 30, 2007	Kitt Peak	Spacewatch	PAD	1.8 km	MPC · JPL
300637	2007 UZ_{55}	—	October 30, 2007	Kitt Peak	Spacewatch	·	1.7 km	MPC · JPL
300638	2007 UA_{59}	—	October 30, 2007	Mount Lemmon	Mount Lemmon Survey	AEO	1.1 km	MPC · JPL
300639	2007 UG_{59}	—	October 30, 2007	Mount Lemmon	Mount Lemmon Survey	(5)	1.4 km	MPC · JPL
300640	2007 UU_{59}	—	October 30, 2007	Mount Lemmon	Mount Lemmon Survey	·	1.9 km	MPC · JPL
300641	2007 UM_{60}	—	October 30, 2007	Mount Lemmon	Mount Lemmon Survey	·	1.7 km	MPC · JPL
300642	2007 UQ_{60}	—	October 30, 2007	Mount Lemmon	Mount Lemmon Survey	EOS	2.7 km	MPC · JPL
300643	2007 UQ_{65}	—	October 31, 2007	Cordell-Lorenz	Cordell-Lorenz	·	1.5 km	MPC · JPL
300644	2007 UK_{75}	—	October 31, 2007	Kitt Peak	Spacewatch	·	1.8 km	MPC · JPL
300645	2007 UQ_{76}	—	October 31, 2007	Mount Lemmon	Mount Lemmon Survey	·	1.5 km	MPC · JPL
300646	2007 UV_{81}	—	October 30, 2007	Kitt Peak	Spacewatch	·	1.2 km	MPC · JPL
300647	2007 UE_{82}	—	October 30, 2007	Kitt Peak	Spacewatch	·	2.4 km	MPC · JPL
300648	2007 UH_{83}	—	October 30, 2007	Kitt Peak	Spacewatch	AGN	1.4 km	MPC · JPL
300649	2007 UJ_{84}	—	October 30, 2007	Kitt Peak	Spacewatch	·	1.8 km	MPC · JPL
300650	2007 UW_{84}	—	October 30, 2007	Kitt Peak	Spacewatch	·	1.8 km	MPC · JPL
300651	2007 UC_{85}	—	October 30, 2007	Kitt Peak	Spacewatch	·	1.4 km	MPC · JPL
300652	2007 UY_{87}	—	October 30, 2007	Kitt Peak	Spacewatch	·	1.4 km	MPC · JPL
300653	2007 UZ_{88}	—	October 30, 2007	Mount Lemmon	Mount Lemmon Survey	AST	1.7 km	MPC · JPL
300654	2007 UV_{99}	—	October 30, 2007	Kitt Peak	Spacewatch	·	2.0 km	MPC · JPL
300655	2007 UA_{102}	—	October 30, 2007	Kitt Peak	Spacewatch	KOR	1.4 km	MPC · JPL
300656	2007 UX_{107}	—	October 30, 2007	Kitt Peak	Spacewatch	·	1.1 km	MPC · JPL
300657	2007 UL_{108}	—	October 30, 2007	Kitt Peak	Spacewatch	·	1.9 km	MPC · JPL
300658	2007 UQ_{118}	—	October 31, 2007	Mount Lemmon	Mount Lemmon Survey	·	2.2 km	MPC · JPL
300659	2007 UV_{122}	—	October 30, 2007	Kitt Peak	Spacewatch	·	1.8 km	MPC · JPL
300660	2007 UW_{123}	—	October 31, 2007	Catalina	CSS	·	2.2 km	MPC · JPL
300661	2007 UQ_{125}	—	October 18, 2007	Mount Lemmon	Mount Lemmon Survey	(29841)	1.4 km	MPC · JPL
300662	2007 UR_{125}	—	October 19, 2007	Catalina	CSS	·	1.4 km	MPC · JPL
300663	2007 UL_{129}	—	October 24, 2007	Mount Lemmon	Mount Lemmon Survey	·	2.5 km	MPC · JPL
300664	2007 UO_{129}	—	October 30, 2007	Kitt Peak	Spacewatch	KOR	1.4 km	MPC · JPL
300665	2007 UM_{130}	—	October 19, 2007	Anderson Mesa	LONEOS	·	1.9 km	MPC · JPL
300666	2007 UV_{137}	—	October 18, 2007	Kitt Peak	Spacewatch	·	2.0 km	MPC · JPL
300667	2007 UX_{138}	—	October 21, 2007	Mount Lemmon	Mount Lemmon Survey	·	2.3 km	MPC · JPL
300668	2007 UP_{140}	—	October 18, 2007	Kitt Peak	Spacewatch	·	1.8 km	MPC · JPL
300669	2007 VM_{5}	—	November 3, 2007	Costitx	OAM	EUN	1.5 km	MPC · JPL
300670	2007 VQ_{5}	—	November 4, 2007	Dauban	Chante-Perdrix	·	1.9 km	MPC · JPL
300671	2007 VE_{7}	—	November 1, 2007	Kitt Peak	Spacewatch	·	2.8 km	MPC · JPL
300672	2007 VH_{11}	—	November 2, 2007	Mount Lemmon	Mount Lemmon Survey	·	2.0 km	MPC · JPL
300673	2007 VZ_{11}	—	November 5, 2007	Purple Mountain	PMO NEO Survey Program	·	2.7 km	MPC · JPL
300674	2007 VL_{12}	—	November 1, 2007	Kitt Peak	Spacewatch	·	1.9 km	MPC · JPL
300675	2007 VJ_{13}	—	November 1, 2007	Mount Lemmon	Mount Lemmon Survey	·	2.1 km	MPC · JPL
300676	2007 VR_{19}	—	November 1, 2007	Kitt Peak	Spacewatch	(5)	1.5 km	MPC · JPL
300677	2007 VB_{20}	—	November 1, 2007	Kitt Peak	Spacewatch	AGN	1.2 km	MPC · JPL
300678	2007 VA_{23}	—	November 2, 2007	Mount Lemmon	Mount Lemmon Survey	·	2.4 km	MPC · JPL
300679	2007 VJ_{25}	—	November 2, 2007	Catalina	CSS	·	2.6 km	MPC · JPL
300680	2007 VL_{26}	—	November 2, 2007	Mount Lemmon	Mount Lemmon Survey	·	1.6 km	MPC · JPL
300681	2007 VQ_{27}	—	November 2, 2007	Mount Lemmon	Mount Lemmon Survey	·	1.6 km	MPC · JPL
300682	2007 VH_{29}	—	November 3, 2007	Mount Lemmon	Mount Lemmon Survey	·	1.4 km	MPC · JPL
300683	2007 VU_{30}	—	November 2, 2007	Kitt Peak	Spacewatch	·	2.5 km	MPC · JPL
300684	2007 VV_{30}	—	November 2, 2007	Kitt Peak	Spacewatch	·	2.1 km	MPC · JPL
300685	2007 VO_{31}	—	November 2, 2007	Kitt Peak	Spacewatch	·	3.1 km	MPC · JPL
300686	2007 VB_{39}	—	November 3, 2007	Mount Lemmon	Mount Lemmon Survey	·	2.2 km	MPC · JPL
300687	2007 VY_{43}	—	November 1, 2007	Kitt Peak	Spacewatch	·	2.0 km	MPC · JPL
300688	2007 VK_{44}	—	November 1, 2007	Kitt Peak	Spacewatch	·	2.4 km	MPC · JPL
300689	2007 VE_{47}	—	November 1, 2007	Kitt Peak	Spacewatch	·	1.9 km	MPC · JPL
300690	2007 VV_{47}	—	November 1, 2007	Kitt Peak	Spacewatch	GEF	1.7 km	MPC · JPL
300691	2007 VF_{50}	—	November 1, 2007	Kitt Peak	Spacewatch	·	2.1 km	MPC · JPL
300692	2007 VD_{53}	—	November 1, 2007	Kitt Peak	Spacewatch	AGN	1.4 km	MPC · JPL
300693	2007 VN_{54}	—	November 1, 2007	Kitt Peak	Spacewatch	HOF	3.2 km	MPC · JPL
300694	2007 VA_{55}	—	November 1, 2007	Kitt Peak	Spacewatch	·	1.4 km	MPC · JPL
300695	2007 VQ_{61}	—	November 1, 2007	Kitt Peak	Spacewatch	·	1.5 km	MPC · JPL
300696	2007 VZ_{61}	—	November 1, 2007	Kitt Peak	Spacewatch	(5)	1.7 km	MPC · JPL
300697	2007 VE_{63}	—	November 1, 2007	Kitt Peak	Spacewatch	·	3.1 km	MPC · JPL
300698	2007 VZ_{65}	—	November 2, 2007	Kitt Peak	Spacewatch	·	1.9 km	MPC · JPL
300699	2007 VY_{67}	—	November 3, 2007	Mount Lemmon	Mount Lemmon Survey	HOF	2.6 km	MPC · JPL
300700	2007 VG_{72}	—	November 1, 2007	Kitt Peak	Spacewatch	·	2.3 km	MPC · JPL

== 300701–300800 ==
back to top

Designation			Discovery			Properties		Ref
Permanent	Provisional	Named after	Date	Site	Discoverer(s)	Category	Diam.	Ref
300701	2007 VJ_{89}	—	November 4, 2007	Socorro	LINEAR	·	2.4 km	MPC · JPL
300702	2007 VZ_{90}	—	November 6, 2007	Socorro	LINEAR	·	2.2 km	MPC · JPL
300703	2007 VG_{94}	—	November 7, 2007	Bisei SG Center	BATTeRS	·	2.0 km	MPC · JPL
300704	2007 VP_{94}	—	November 7, 2007	Bisei SG Center	BATTeRS	·	1.4 km	MPC · JPL
300705	2007 VP_{99}	—	November 2, 2007	Kitt Peak	Spacewatch	·	3.1 km	MPC · JPL
300706	2007 VM_{100}	—	November 2, 2007	Kitt Peak	Spacewatch	EOS	3.3 km	MPC · JPL
300707	2007 VY_{101}	—	November 2, 2007	Mount Lemmon	Mount Lemmon Survey	·	2.6 km	MPC · JPL
300708	2007 VX_{102}	—	November 3, 2007	Kitt Peak	Spacewatch	·	1.0 km	MPC · JPL
300709	2007 VU_{108}	—	November 3, 2007	Kitt Peak	Spacewatch	·	2.6 km	MPC · JPL
300710	2007 VJ_{110}	—	November 3, 2007	Kitt Peak	Spacewatch	·	2.3 km	MPC · JPL
300711	2007 VN_{113}	—	November 3, 2007	Kitt Peak	Spacewatch	·	2.4 km	MPC · JPL
300712	2007 VV_{114}	—	November 3, 2007	Kitt Peak	Spacewatch	·	2.4 km	MPC · JPL
300713	2007 VQ_{115}	—	November 3, 2007	Kitt Peak	Spacewatch	EOS	2.2 km	MPC · JPL
300714	2007 VJ_{117}	—	November 3, 2007	Kitt Peak	Spacewatch	·	1.7 km	MPC · JPL
300715	2007 VO_{117}	—	November 3, 2007	Lulin	LUSS	·	2.1 km	MPC · JPL
300716	2007 VP_{117}	—	November 4, 2007	Kitt Peak	Spacewatch	·	1.6 km	MPC · JPL
300717	2007 VC_{120}	—	November 5, 2007	Kitt Peak	Spacewatch	·	1.7 km	MPC · JPL
300718	2007 VH_{120}	—	November 5, 2007	Kitt Peak	Spacewatch	·	1.2 km	MPC · JPL
300719	2007 VG_{121}	—	November 5, 2007	Kitt Peak	Spacewatch	·	1.7 km	MPC · JPL
300720	2007 VS_{121}	—	November 5, 2007	Kitt Peak	Spacewatch	·	1.7 km	MPC · JPL
300721	2007 VW_{124}	—	November 5, 2007	Mount Lemmon	Mount Lemmon Survey	·	2.1 km	MPC · JPL
300722	2007 VC_{125}	—	November 5, 2007	Kitt Peak	Spacewatch	·	2.5 km	MPC · JPL
300723	2007 VD_{125}	—	November 5, 2007	Purple Mountain	PMO NEO Survey Program	·	1.4 km	MPC · JPL
300724	2007 VP_{125}	—	November 7, 2007	Catalina	CSS	EUN	1.4 km	MPC · JPL
300725	2007 VP_{132}	—	November 2, 2007	Mount Lemmon	Mount Lemmon Survey	·	2.2 km	MPC · JPL
300726	2007 VW_{132}	—	November 2, 2007	Mount Lemmon	Mount Lemmon Survey	·	1.0 km	MPC · JPL
300727	2007 VW_{133}	—	November 2, 2007	Catalina	CSS	EUN	1.5 km	MPC · JPL
300728	2007 VV_{137}	—	November 6, 2007	Purple Mountain	PMO NEO Survey Program	·	3.1 km	MPC · JPL
300729	2007 VK_{141}	—	November 4, 2007	Kitt Peak	Spacewatch	·	1.7 km	MPC · JPL
300730	2007 VF_{142}	—	November 4, 2007	Kitt Peak	Spacewatch	KOR	1.8 km	MPC · JPL
300731	2007 VR_{142}	—	November 4, 2007	Kitt Peak	Spacewatch	HOF · fast	3.4 km	MPC · JPL
300732	2007 VP_{144}	—	November 4, 2007	Kitt Peak	Spacewatch	·	2.0 km	MPC · JPL
300733	2007 VE_{145}	—	November 4, 2007	Kitt Peak	Spacewatch	·	2.4 km	MPC · JPL
300734	2007 VH_{147}	—	January 28, 2004	Kitt Peak	Spacewatch	AGN	1.6 km	MPC · JPL
300735	2007 VL_{147}	—	November 4, 2007	Kitt Peak	Spacewatch	·	2.4 km	MPC · JPL
300736	2007 VX_{148}	—	November 7, 2007	Mount Lemmon	Mount Lemmon Survey	·	1.3 km	MPC · JPL
300737	2007 VY_{148}	—	November 7, 2007	Mount Lemmon	Mount Lemmon Survey	·	1.3 km	MPC · JPL
300738	2007 VP_{155}	—	November 5, 2007	Kitt Peak	Spacewatch	·	1.9 km	MPC · JPL
300739	2007 VZ_{157}	—	November 5, 2007	Kitt Peak	Spacewatch	·	1.8 km	MPC · JPL
300740	2007 VT_{161}	—	November 5, 2007	Kitt Peak	Spacewatch	·	2.4 km	MPC · JPL
300741	2007 VJ_{165}	—	November 5, 2007	Kitt Peak	Spacewatch	·	2.6 km	MPC · JPL
300742	2007 VN_{167}	—	November 5, 2007	Kitt Peak	Spacewatch	HOF	3.1 km	MPC · JPL
300743	2007 VS_{171}	—	November 7, 2007	Kitt Peak	Spacewatch	·	1.9 km	MPC · JPL
300744	2007 VO_{180}	—	November 7, 2007	Catalina	CSS	·	2.0 km	MPC · JPL
300745	2007 VU_{189}	—	November 13, 2007	La Sagra	OAM	·	3.6 km	MPC · JPL
300746	2007 VR_{190}	—	November 8, 2007	Kitt Peak	Spacewatch	EUN	1.2 km	MPC · JPL
300747	2007 VV_{191}	—	November 4, 2007	Mount Lemmon	Mount Lemmon Survey	·	2.0 km	MPC · JPL
300748	2007 VD_{192}	—	November 4, 2007	Mount Lemmon	Mount Lemmon Survey	·	1.4 km	MPC · JPL
300749	2007 VP_{192}	—	November 4, 2007	Mount Lemmon	Mount Lemmon Survey	·	2.7 km	MPC · JPL
300750	2007 VC_{201}	—	November 9, 2007	Mount Lemmon	Mount Lemmon Survey	·	3.8 km	MPC · JPL
300751	2007 VL_{209}	—	November 7, 2007	Kitt Peak	Spacewatch	NEM	2.2 km	MPC · JPL
300752	2007 VX_{211}	—	November 9, 2007	Kitt Peak	Spacewatch	·	1.8 km	MPC · JPL
300753	2007 VL_{215}	—	November 9, 2007	Kitt Peak	Spacewatch	·	3.6 km	MPC · JPL
300754	2007 VL_{221}	—	November 12, 2007	Mount Lemmon	Mount Lemmon Survey	(5)	1.2 km	MPC · JPL
300755	2007 VY_{221}	—	November 13, 2007	Kitt Peak	Spacewatch	·	2.1 km	MPC · JPL
300756	2007 VR_{224}	—	November 9, 2007	Mount Lemmon	Mount Lemmon Survey	·	1.6 km	MPC · JPL
300757	2007 VK_{229}	—	November 7, 2007	Kitt Peak	Spacewatch	·	2.1 km	MPC · JPL
300758	2007 VZ_{229}	—	November 7, 2007	Kitt Peak	Spacewatch	HOF	2.6 km	MPC · JPL
300759	2007 VC_{234}	—	November 9, 2007	Eskridge	G. Hug	HOF	2.3 km	MPC · JPL
300760	2007 VP_{235}	—	November 9, 2007	Kitt Peak	Spacewatch	·	1.8 km	MPC · JPL
300761	2007 VE_{237}	—	November 11, 2007	Mount Lemmon	Mount Lemmon Survey	·	1.4 km	MPC · JPL
300762	2007 VR_{238}	—	November 13, 2007	Kitt Peak	Spacewatch	·	2.4 km	MPC · JPL
300763	2007 VN_{240}	—	November 7, 2007	Catalina	CSS	·	1.4 km	MPC · JPL
300764	2007 VV_{242}	—	November 13, 2007	Mount Lemmon	Mount Lemmon Survey	HOF	2.8 km	MPC · JPL
300765	2007 VL_{244}	—	November 15, 2007	La Sagra	OAM	·	2.0 km	MPC · JPL
300766	2007 VX_{244}	—	November 14, 2007	Bisei SG Center	BATTeRS	·	2.2 km	MPC · JPL
300767	2007 VU_{247}	—	November 13, 2007	Mount Lemmon	Mount Lemmon Survey	·	4.4 km	MPC · JPL
300768	2007 VE_{251}	—	November 9, 2007	Catalina	CSS	·	1.9 km	MPC · JPL
300769	2007 VT_{251}	—	November 10, 2007	Mount Lemmon	Mount Lemmon Survey	·	2.2 km	MPC · JPL
300770	2007 VW_{251}	—	November 12, 2007	Catalina	CSS	·	1.6 km	MPC · JPL
300771	2007 VN_{257}	—	November 13, 2007	Catalina	CSS	·	2.4 km	MPC · JPL
300772	2007 VO_{257}	—	November 13, 2007	Catalina	CSS	·	1.3 km	MPC · JPL
300773	2007 VV_{258}	—	November 15, 2007	Mount Lemmon	Mount Lemmon Survey	·	3.1 km	MPC · JPL
300774	2007 VH_{261}	—	November 13, 2007	Kitt Peak	Spacewatch	·	1.7 km	MPC · JPL
300775	2007 VN_{261}	—	November 13, 2007	Kitt Peak	Spacewatch	·	1.8 km	MPC · JPL
300776	2007 VA_{269}	—	November 12, 2007	Socorro	LINEAR	·	2.1 km	MPC · JPL
300777	2007 VU_{276}	—	November 14, 2007	Kitt Peak	Spacewatch	·	3.1 km	MPC · JPL
300778	2007 VT_{279}	—	November 14, 2007	Kitt Peak	Spacewatch	·	1.8 km	MPC · JPL
300779	2007 VM_{285}	—	November 14, 2007	Kitt Peak	Spacewatch	KOR	1.5 km	MPC · JPL
300780	2007 VY_{285}	—	November 14, 2007	Kitt Peak	Spacewatch	·	1.8 km	MPC · JPL
300781	2007 VW_{286}	—	November 15, 2007	Catalina	CSS	·	2.0 km	MPC · JPL
300782	2007 VX_{286}	—	November 15, 2007	Catalina	CSS	ADE	3.3 km	MPC · JPL
300783	2007 VF_{287}	—	November 15, 2007	Catalina	CSS	EUN	1.7 km	MPC · JPL
300784	2007 VL_{299}	—	November 12, 2007	Catalina	CSS	·	1.5 km	MPC · JPL
300785	2007 VN_{303}	—	November 3, 2007	Catalina	CSS	·	2.8 km	MPC · JPL
300786	2007 VF_{309}	—	November 9, 2007	Mount Lemmon	Mount Lemmon Survey	·	2.3 km	MPC · JPL
300787	2007 VA_{312}	—	November 2, 2007	Kitt Peak	Spacewatch	AGN	1.8 km	MPC · JPL
300788	2007 VG_{315}	—	November 5, 2007	Mount Lemmon	Mount Lemmon Survey	PAD	2.0 km	MPC · JPL
300789	2007 VN_{315}	—	November 6, 2007	Kitt Peak	Spacewatch	·	2.2 km	MPC · JPL
300790	2007 VF_{318}	—	November 1, 2007	Kitt Peak	Spacewatch	·	2.0 km	MPC · JPL
300791	2007 VF_{321}	—	November 8, 2007	Kitt Peak	Spacewatch	·	2.7 km	MPC · JPL
300792	2007 VN_{321}	—	November 13, 2007	Mount Lemmon	Mount Lemmon Survey	·	2.3 km	MPC · JPL
300793	2007 VX_{321}	—	November 8, 2007	Catalina	CSS	JUN	1.6 km	MPC · JPL
300794	2007 VU_{323}	—	November 4, 2007	Socorro	LINEAR	·	1.6 km	MPC · JPL
300795	2007 VM_{331}	—	November 6, 2007	Kitt Peak	Spacewatch	(5)	1.8 km	MPC · JPL
300796	2007 VR_{331}	—	November 7, 2007	Kitt Peak	Spacewatch	AGN	1.1 km	MPC · JPL
300797	2007 VT_{331}	—	November 7, 2007	Kitt Peak	Spacewatch	AGN	1.7 km	MPC · JPL
300798	2007 VV_{331}	—	November 7, 2007	Mount Lemmon	Mount Lemmon Survey	·	3.3 km	MPC · JPL
300799	2007 VZ_{331}	—	November 7, 2007	Mount Lemmon	Mount Lemmon Survey	·	5.1 km	MPC · JPL
300800	2007 VB_{332}	—	November 7, 2007	Socorro	LINEAR	(5)	1.5 km	MPC · JPL

== 300801–300900 ==
back to top

Designation			Discovery			Properties		Ref
Permanent	Provisional	Named after	Date	Site	Discoverer(s)	Category	Diam.	Ref
300801	2007 VC_{332}	—	November 7, 2007	Socorro	LINEAR	·	1.6 km	MPC · JPL
300802	2007 WJ	—	November 17, 2007	Bisei SG Center	BATTeRS	·	1.4 km	MPC · JPL
300803	2007 WK_{1}	—	November 16, 2007	Dauban	Chante-Perdrix	·	2.3 km	MPC · JPL
300804	2007 WB_{2}	—	November 17, 2007	Bisei SG Center	BATTeRS	NEM	2.4 km	MPC · JPL
300805	2007 WY_{5}	—	November 17, 2007	Socorro	LINEAR	·	2.0 km	MPC · JPL
300806	2007 WU_{6}	—	November 18, 2007	Socorro	LINEAR	·	1.6 km	MPC · JPL
300807	2007 WW_{6}	—	November 18, 2007	Socorro	LINEAR	·	1.9 km	MPC · JPL
300808	2007 WM_{12}	—	November 17, 2007	Catalina	CSS	·	2.4 km	MPC · JPL
300809	2007 WJ_{13}	—	November 18, 2007	Mount Lemmon	Mount Lemmon Survey	·	2.1 km	MPC · JPL
300810	2007 WZ_{14}	—	November 18, 2007	Mount Lemmon	Mount Lemmon Survey	PAD	2.1 km	MPC · JPL
300811	2007 WN_{21}	—	November 17, 2007	Kitt Peak	Spacewatch	·	1.7 km	MPC · JPL
300812	2007 WE_{22}	—	November 17, 2007	Kitt Peak	Spacewatch	·	1.9 km	MPC · JPL
300813	2007 WA_{24}	—	November 18, 2007	Mount Lemmon	Mount Lemmon Survey	·	2.6 km	MPC · JPL
300814	2007 WG_{24}	—	September 14, 2007	Mount Lemmon	Mount Lemmon Survey	NEM	2.4 km	MPC · JPL
300815	2007 WD_{36}	—	November 19, 2007	Mount Lemmon	Mount Lemmon Survey	AGN	1.5 km	MPC · JPL
300816	2007 WF_{36}	—	November 19, 2007	Mount Lemmon	Mount Lemmon Survey	·	2.4 km	MPC · JPL
300817	2007 WY_{43}	—	November 19, 2007	Mount Lemmon	Mount Lemmon Survey	(13314)	2.0 km	MPC · JPL
300818	2007 WJ_{44}	—	November 19, 2007	Mount Lemmon	Mount Lemmon Survey	·	2.3 km	MPC · JPL
300819	2007 WD_{46}	—	November 20, 2007	Mount Lemmon	Mount Lemmon Survey	·	2.9 km	MPC · JPL
300820	2007 WV_{52}	—	November 17, 2007	Eskridge	G. Hug	·	1.8 km	MPC · JPL
300821 Margaritasalas	2007 WH_{55}	Margaritasalas	November 30, 2007	La Sagra	OAM	·	1.7 km	MPC · JPL
300822	2007 WE_{56}	—	November 30, 2007	Lulin	Yang, T.-C., Q. Ye	GEF	2.0 km	MPC · JPL
300823	2007 WJ_{61}	—	November 16, 2007	Socorro	LINEAR	·	2.4 km	MPC · JPL
300824	2007 XR_{3}	—	December 3, 2007	7300	W. K. Y. Yeung	(1547)	2.1 km	MPC · JPL
300825	2007 XL_{9}	—	December 4, 2007	Mount Lemmon	Mount Lemmon Survey	·	2.6 km	MPC · JPL
300826	2007 XJ_{13}	—	December 4, 2007	Catalina	CSS	EOS	2.8 km	MPC · JPL
300827	2007 XT_{17}	—	December 10, 2007	Socorro	LINEAR	·	2.5 km	MPC · JPL
300828	2007 XE_{20}	—	September 11, 2002	Palomar	NEAT	·	2.2 km	MPC · JPL
300829	2007 XQ_{20}	—	December 12, 2007	La Sagra	OAM	·	1.9 km	MPC · JPL
300830	2007 XK_{22}	—	December 10, 2007	Socorro	LINEAR	·	1.9 km	MPC · JPL
300831	2007 XE_{25}	—	December 15, 2007	Kanab	Sheridan, E.	·	2.2 km	MPC · JPL
300832	2007 XV_{28}	—	December 15, 2007	Kitt Peak	Spacewatch	HOF	3.0 km	MPC · JPL
300833	2007 XJ_{30}	—	December 15, 2007	Kitt Peak	Spacewatch	·	1.9 km	MPC · JPL
300834	2007 XS_{32}	—	December 15, 2007	Kitt Peak	Spacewatch	·	4.4 km	MPC · JPL
300835	2007 XQ_{33}	—	December 10, 2007	Socorro	LINEAR	·	3.1 km	MPC · JPL
300836	2007 XX_{34}	—	December 13, 2007	Socorro	LINEAR	ADE	2.2 km	MPC · JPL
300837	2007 XA_{35}	—	December 13, 2007	Socorro	LINEAR	RAF	1.3 km	MPC · JPL
300838	2007 XL_{36}	—	December 13, 2007	Socorro	LINEAR	·	3.2 km	MPC · JPL
300839	2007 XZ_{38}	—	December 13, 2007	Socorro	LINEAR	MRX	1.3 km	MPC · JPL
300840	2007 XT_{42}	—	December 15, 2007	Kitt Peak	Spacewatch	EOS	2.3 km	MPC · JPL
300841	2007 XW_{47}	—	December 15, 2007	Kitt Peak	Spacewatch	·	3.4 km	MPC · JPL
300842	2007 XA_{50}	—	December 15, 2007	Kitt Peak	Spacewatch	·	4.5 km	MPC · JPL
300843	2007 XP_{53}	—	December 14, 2007	Mount Lemmon	Mount Lemmon Survey	·	2.0 km	MPC · JPL
300844	2007 XT_{54}	—	December 4, 2007	Kitt Peak	Spacewatch	·	2.4 km	MPC · JPL
300845	2007 YH_{3}	—	December 17, 2007	Eskridge	G. Hug	·	2.4 km	MPC · JPL
300846	2007 YU_{9}	—	December 16, 2007	Mount Lemmon	Mount Lemmon Survey	VER	3.9 km	MPC · JPL
300847	2007 YV_{13}	—	December 17, 2007	Mount Lemmon	Mount Lemmon Survey	·	2.5 km	MPC · JPL
300848	2007 YX_{14}	—	December 19, 2007	Bisei SG Center	BATTeRS	·	3.0 km	MPC · JPL
300849	2007 YP_{17}	—	December 16, 2007	Kitt Peak	Spacewatch	·	2.9 km	MPC · JPL
300850	2007 YX_{18}	—	December 3, 2007	Kitt Peak	Spacewatch	·	4.1 km	MPC · JPL
300851	2007 YD_{25}	—	December 18, 2007	Mount Lemmon	Mount Lemmon Survey	·	2.0 km	MPC · JPL
300852	2007 YR_{30}	—	December 28, 2007	Kitt Peak	Spacewatch	AGN	1.6 km	MPC · JPL
300853	2007 YR_{31}	—	December 28, 2007	Kitt Peak	Spacewatch	AGN	1.8 km	MPC · JPL
300854 Changyuin	2007 YV_{31}	Changyuin	December 28, 2007	Lulin	C.-S. Lin, Q. Ye	EOS	2.6 km	MPC · JPL
300855	2007 YZ_{33}	—	December 28, 2007	Kitt Peak	Spacewatch	·	2.3 km	MPC · JPL
300856	2007 YP_{36}	—	December 30, 2007	Mount Lemmon	Mount Lemmon Survey	EOS	2.7 km	MPC · JPL
300857	2007 YW_{37}	—	December 30, 2007	Mount Lemmon	Mount Lemmon Survey	EOS	2.5 km	MPC · JPL
300858	2007 YD_{43}	—	December 30, 2007	Catalina	CSS	·	4.1 km	MPC · JPL
300859	2007 YP_{45}	—	December 30, 2007	Mount Lemmon	Mount Lemmon Survey	·	3.4 km	MPC · JPL
300860	2007 YW_{46}	—	December 30, 2007	Mount Lemmon	Mount Lemmon Survey	·	2.9 km	MPC · JPL
300861	2007 YJ_{51}	—	December 28, 2007	Kitt Peak	Spacewatch	KOR	1.7 km	MPC · JPL
300862	2007 YS_{68}	—	December 30, 2007	Kitt Peak	Spacewatch	·	3.8 km	MPC · JPL
300863	2007 YA_{69}	—	December 17, 2007	Kitt Peak	Spacewatch	·	2.0 km	MPC · JPL
300864	2007 YM_{69}	—	December 30, 2007	Kitt Peak	Spacewatch	·	2.1 km	MPC · JPL
300865	2007 YR_{71}	—	December 17, 2007	Mount Lemmon	Mount Lemmon Survey	·	4.0 km	MPC · JPL
300866	2007 YC_{72}	—	December 18, 2007	Mount Lemmon	Mount Lemmon Survey	VER	4.1 km	MPC · JPL
300867	2008 AR_{4}	—	January 4, 2008	Purple Mountain	PMO NEO Survey Program	DOR	3.0 km	MPC · JPL
300868	2008 AN_{11}	—	January 10, 2008	Mount Lemmon	Mount Lemmon Survey	·	3.1 km	MPC · JPL
300869	2008 AA_{13}	—	January 10, 2008	Mount Lemmon	Mount Lemmon Survey	·	3.1 km	MPC · JPL
300870	2008 AS_{24}	—	January 10, 2008	Mount Lemmon	Mount Lemmon Survey	·	3.4 km	MPC · JPL
300871	2008 AT_{27}	—	January 10, 2008	Mount Lemmon	Mount Lemmon Survey	·	3.5 km	MPC · JPL
300872	2008 AV_{29}	—	January 5, 2008	Bisei SG Center	BATTeRS	·	2.5 km	MPC · JPL
300873	2008 AD_{32}	—	January 11, 2008	Kitt Peak	Spacewatch	·	2.5 km	MPC · JPL
300874	2008 AV_{54}	—	January 11, 2008	Kitt Peak	Spacewatch	·	2.2 km	MPC · JPL
300875	2008 AM_{65}	—	January 11, 2008	Mount Lemmon	Mount Lemmon Survey	HYG	2.8 km	MPC · JPL
300876	2008 AT_{74}	—	January 11, 2008	Kitt Peak	Spacewatch	·	2.3 km	MPC · JPL
300877	2008 AO_{78}	—	January 12, 2008	Kitt Peak	Spacewatch	·	6.2 km	MPC · JPL
300878	2008 AX_{78}	—	January 12, 2008	Kitt Peak	Spacewatch	·	3.3 km	MPC · JPL
300879	2008 AE_{87}	—	January 12, 2008	Mount Lemmon	Mount Lemmon Survey	·	5.1 km	MPC · JPL
300880	2008 AM_{92}	—	January 14, 2008	Kitt Peak	Spacewatch	·	4.1 km	MPC · JPL
300881	2008 AO_{96}	—	January 14, 2008	Kitt Peak	Spacewatch	·	3.0 km	MPC · JPL
300882	2008 AU_{96}	—	January 14, 2008	Kitt Peak	Spacewatch	·	3.3 km	MPC · JPL
300883	2008 AT_{116}	—	January 12, 2008	Kitt Peak	Spacewatch	·	2.3 km	MPC · JPL
300884	2008 AJ_{118}	—	January 14, 2008	Kitt Peak	Spacewatch	·	2.4 km	MPC · JPL
300885	2008 AJ_{136}	—	January 12, 2008	Socorro	LINEAR	·	4.3 km	MPC · JPL
300886	2008 AT_{136}	—	January 13, 2008	Kitt Peak	Spacewatch	·	2.9 km	MPC · JPL
300887	2008 AH_{137}	—	January 15, 2008	Socorro	LINEAR	·	4.9 km	MPC · JPL
300888	2008 AM_{137}	—	January 1, 2008	Mount Lemmon	Mount Lemmon Survey	EOS	2.2 km	MPC · JPL
300889	2008 BL_{5}	—	January 16, 2008	Mount Lemmon	Mount Lemmon Survey	EOS	2.6 km	MPC · JPL
300890	2008 BC_{12}	—	January 18, 2008	Kitt Peak	Spacewatch	·	3.0 km	MPC · JPL
300891	2008 BO_{13}	—	January 19, 2008	Kitt Peak	Spacewatch	·	4.0 km	MPC · JPL
300892 Taichung	2008 BT_{15}	Taichung	January 28, 2008	Lulin	Lin, C.-S., Q. Ye	THM	2.5 km	MPC · JPL
300893	2008 BY_{16}	—	January 28, 2008	La Sagra	OAM	EMA	4.9 km	MPC · JPL
300894	2008 BB_{18}	—	January 30, 2008	Mount Lemmon	Mount Lemmon Survey	·	3.4 km	MPC · JPL
300895	2008 BW_{23}	—	January 31, 2008	Catalina	CSS	EOS	2.4 km	MPC · JPL
300896	2008 BF_{24}	—	January 30, 2008	Catalina	CSS	·	4.3 km	MPC · JPL
300897	2008 BQ_{24}	—	January 30, 2008	La Sagra	OAM	·	6.7 km	MPC · JPL
300898	2008 BC_{25}	—	January 30, 2008	Eskridge	G. Hug	EOS	2.5 km	MPC · JPL
300899	2008 BX_{30}	—	January 30, 2008	Mount Lemmon	Mount Lemmon Survey	·	3.5 km	MPC · JPL
300900	2008 BX_{32}	—	January 30, 2008	Kitt Peak	Spacewatch	·	2.9 km	MPC · JPL

== 300901–301000 ==
back to top

Designation			Discovery			Properties		Ref
Permanent	Provisional	Named after	Date	Site	Discoverer(s)	Category	Diam.	Ref
300901	2008 BH_{33}	—	January 30, 2008	Kitt Peak	Spacewatch	·	3.8 km	MPC · JPL
300902	2008 BE_{34}	—	January 30, 2008	Catalina	CSS	·	2.6 km	MPC · JPL
300903	2008 BX_{38}	—	January 31, 2008	Mount Lemmon	Mount Lemmon Survey	CYB	5.0 km	MPC · JPL
300904	2008 BL_{39}	—	January 30, 2008	Catalina	CSS	·	4.0 km	MPC · JPL
300905	2008 BZ_{40}	—	January 31, 2008	La Sagra	OAM	EOS	2.2 km	MPC · JPL
300906	2008 BQ_{41}	—	January 30, 2008	Catalina	CSS	·	5.2 km	MPC · JPL
300907	2008 BJ_{42}	—	January 31, 2008	Catalina	CSS	·	4.8 km	MPC · JPL
300908	2008 BV_{43}	—	January 30, 2008	Catalina	CSS	·	2.1 km	MPC · JPL
300909 Kenthompson	2008 BZ_{45}	Kenthompson	January 30, 2008	Vail-Jarnac	Glinos, T., D. H. Levy	VER	3.4 km	MPC · JPL
300910	2008 BF_{48}	—	January 17, 2008	Mount Lemmon	Mount Lemmon Survey	·	3.9 km	MPC · JPL
300911	2008 BG_{48}	—	January 17, 2008	Kitt Peak	Spacewatch	·	3.3 km	MPC · JPL
300912	2008 BC_{50}	—	January 17, 2008	Kitt Peak	Spacewatch	EMA	4.9 km	MPC · JPL
300913	2008 CL	—	February 1, 2008	Vail-Jarnac	Jarnac	·	2.0 km	MPC · JPL
300914	2008 CS_{3}	—	February 2, 2008	Kitt Peak	Spacewatch	·	2.5 km	MPC · JPL
300915	2008 CQ_{10}	—	February 2, 2008	Catalina	CSS	·	3.3 km	MPC · JPL
300916	2008 CM_{16}	—	February 3, 2008	Kitt Peak	Spacewatch	·	2.7 km	MPC · JPL
300917	2008 CO_{16}	—	February 3, 2008	Kitt Peak	Spacewatch	·	3.0 km	MPC · JPL
300918	2008 CU_{16}	—	February 3, 2008	Kitt Peak	Spacewatch	·	2.9 km	MPC · JPL
300919	2008 CX_{16}	—	February 3, 2008	Kitt Peak	Spacewatch	·	2.1 km	MPC · JPL
300920	2008 CA_{28}	—	February 2, 2008	Kitt Peak	Spacewatch	·	3.5 km	MPC · JPL
300921	2008 CC_{29}	—	February 2, 2008	Kitt Peak	Spacewatch	EOS	4.7 km	MPC · JPL
300922	2008 CU_{36}	—	February 2, 2008	Kitt Peak	Spacewatch	CYB	4.2 km	MPC · JPL
300923	2008 CA_{54}	—	February 7, 2008	Catalina	CSS	(31811)	3.8 km	MPC · JPL
300924	2008 CR_{54}	—	February 7, 2008	Mount Lemmon	Mount Lemmon Survey	·	2.5 km	MPC · JPL
300925	2008 CO_{68}	—	February 6, 2008	Socorro	LINEAR	·	4.4 km	MPC · JPL
300926	2008 CJ_{69}	—	February 8, 2008	Socorro	LINEAR	·	2.0 km	MPC · JPL
300927	2008 CE_{71}	—	February 3, 2008	Catalina	CSS	DOR	3.4 km	MPC · JPL
300928 Uderzo	2008 CQ_{72}	Uderzo	February 9, 2008	Saint-Sulpice	B. Christophe	·	2.6 km	MPC · JPL
300929	2008 CU_{73}	—	February 6, 2008	Catalina	CSS	URS	4.3 km	MPC · JPL
300930	2008 CQ_{77}	—	February 6, 2008	Catalina	CSS	EOS	2.6 km	MPC · JPL
300931	2008 CS_{97}	—	February 9, 2008	Kitt Peak	Spacewatch	·	3.4 km	MPC · JPL
300932 Kyslyuk	2008 CL_{117}	Kyslyuk	February 11, 2008	Andrushivka	Andrushivka	·	3.6 km	MPC · JPL
300933 Teresamarion	2008 CG_{118}	Teresamarion	February 8, 2008	Costitx	OAM	EOS	2.7 km	MPC · JPL
300934	2008 CS_{119}	—	February 14, 2008	Taunus	R. Kling, Zimmer, U.	·	3.6 km	MPC · JPL
300935	2008 CH_{125}	—	February 8, 2008	Kitt Peak	Spacewatch	·	5.3 km	MPC · JPL
300936	2008 CE_{129}	—	January 20, 2002	Kitt Peak	Spacewatch	·	5.0 km	MPC · JPL
300937	2008 CR_{131}	—	February 8, 2008	Kitt Peak	Spacewatch	·	2.5 km	MPC · JPL
300938	2008 CF_{135}	—	February 8, 2008	Mount Lemmon	Mount Lemmon Survey	·	3.1 km	MPC · JPL
300939	2008 CD_{138}	—	February 8, 2008	Kitt Peak	Spacewatch	·	3.2 km	MPC · JPL
300940	2008 CQ_{140}	—	February 8, 2008	Kitt Peak	Spacewatch	·	2.9 km	MPC · JPL
300941	2008 CE_{155}	—	February 9, 2008	Mount Lemmon	Mount Lemmon Survey	·	2.8 km	MPC · JPL
300942	2008 CM_{168}	—	February 12, 2008	Mount Lemmon	Mount Lemmon Survey	KOR	1.7 km	MPC · JPL
300943	2008 CT_{175}	—	February 6, 2008	Socorro	LINEAR	EOS	2.5 km	MPC · JPL
300944	2008 CC_{176}	—	February 6, 2008	Socorro	LINEAR	URS	5.3 km	MPC · JPL
300945	2008 CM_{177}	—	February 3, 2008	Kitt Peak	Spacewatch	·	3.7 km	MPC · JPL
300946	2008 CC_{179}	—	February 6, 2008	Catalina	CSS	·	3.9 km	MPC · JPL
300947	2008 CP_{183}	—	February 13, 2008	Catalina	CSS	·	4.0 km	MPC · JPL
300948	2008 CV_{184}	—	February 10, 2008	Siding Spring	SSS	·	6.5 km	MPC · JPL
300949	2008 CM_{185}	—	February 1, 2008	Kitt Peak	Spacewatch	·	3.5 km	MPC · JPL
300950	2008 CJ_{193}	—	February 2, 2008	Kitt Peak	Spacewatch	EOS	1.9 km	MPC · JPL
300951	2008 CK_{193}	—	February 2, 2008	Kitt Peak	Spacewatch	(1298)	3.2 km	MPC · JPL
300952	2008 CS_{194}	—	February 12, 2008	Mount Lemmon	Mount Lemmon Survey	HYG	3.0 km	MPC · JPL
300953	2008 CS_{203}	—	February 12, 2008	Kitt Peak	Spacewatch	HYG	3.5 km	MPC · JPL
300954	2008 CY_{209}	—	February 10, 2008	Socorro	LINEAR	·	3.0 km	MPC · JPL
300955	2008 DR_{1}	—	February 24, 2008	Mount Lemmon	Mount Lemmon Survey	·	5.3 km	MPC · JPL
300956	2008 DA_{7}	—	February 24, 2008	Kitt Peak	Spacewatch	·	2.4 km	MPC · JPL
300957	2008 DN_{11}	—	February 26, 2008	Kitt Peak	Spacewatch	EOS	2.2 km	MPC · JPL
300958	2008 DH_{13}	—	February 26, 2008	Kitt Peak	Spacewatch	·	3.7 km	MPC · JPL
300959	2008 DF_{24}	—	February 27, 2008	Mount Lemmon	Mount Lemmon Survey	CYB	4.7 km	MPC · JPL
300960	2008 DR_{29}	—	February 26, 2008	Mount Lemmon	Mount Lemmon Survey	·	3.5 km	MPC · JPL
300961	2008 DQ_{33}	—	February 27, 2008	Catalina	CSS	VER	4.0 km	MPC · JPL
300962	2008 DU_{33}	—	February 27, 2008	Catalina	CSS	·	5.0 km	MPC · JPL
300963	2008 DH_{48}	—	February 28, 2008	Mount Lemmon	Mount Lemmon Survey	·	3.9 km	MPC · JPL
300964	2008 DP_{51}	—	February 29, 2008	Mount Lemmon	Mount Lemmon Survey	·	4.3 km	MPC · JPL
300965	2008 DM_{52}	—	February 29, 2008	Kitt Peak	Spacewatch	·	3.0 km	MPC · JPL
300966	2008 DH_{71}	—	February 18, 2008	Mount Lemmon	Mount Lemmon Survey	·	3.5 km	MPC · JPL
300967	2008 DQ_{83}	—	February 28, 2008	Kitt Peak	Spacewatch	·	2.9 km	MPC · JPL
300968	2008 EN_{3}	—	March 1, 2008	Mount Lemmon	Mount Lemmon Survey	CYB	5.6 km	MPC · JPL
300969	2008 EJ_{19}	—	March 2, 2008	Mount Lemmon	Mount Lemmon Survey	·	3.2 km	MPC · JPL
300970	2008 EQ_{29}	—	March 4, 2008	Mount Lemmon	Mount Lemmon Survey	·	4.3 km	MPC · JPL
300971	2008 EQ_{38}	—	March 4, 2008	Kitt Peak	Spacewatch	·	5.4 km	MPC · JPL
300972	2008 EY_{45}	—	March 5, 2008	Kitt Peak	Spacewatch	(69559)	6.5 km	MPC · JPL
300973	2008 EW_{50}	—	March 6, 2008	Mount Lemmon	Mount Lemmon Survey	·	5.3 km	MPC · JPL
300974	2008 EH_{83}	—	March 9, 2008	Socorro	LINEAR	·	4.2 km	MPC · JPL
300975	2008 EM_{83}	—	March 9, 2008	Socorro	LINEAR	·	3.6 km	MPC · JPL
300976	2008 ER_{85}	—	March 7, 2008	Kitt Peak	Spacewatch	·	3.8 km	MPC · JPL
300977	2008 EE_{91}	—	March 1, 2008	Catalina	CSS	EUP	4.0 km	MPC · JPL
300978	2008 ED_{98}	—	March 7, 2008	Catalina	CSS	T_{j} (2.97)	4.6 km	MPC · JPL
300979	2008 EZ_{103}	—	March 5, 2008	Mount Lemmon	Mount Lemmon Survey	·	5.1 km	MPC · JPL
300980	2008 ED_{108}	—	March 7, 2008	Catalina	CSS	·	5.7 km	MPC · JPL
300981	2008 EU_{130}	—	March 11, 2008	Kitt Peak	Spacewatch	·	2.5 km	MPC · JPL
300982	2008 EJ_{133}	—	April 4, 2003	Kitt Peak	Spacewatch	·	3.6 km	MPC · JPL
300983	2008 EK_{138}	—	March 11, 2008	Mount Lemmon	Mount Lemmon Survey	·	3.5 km	MPC · JPL
300984	2008 ES_{163}	—	March 14, 2008	Catalina	CSS	HYG	3.7 km	MPC · JPL
300985	2008 FB_{1}	—	March 25, 2008	Kitt Peak	Spacewatch	·	3.9 km	MPC · JPL
300986	2008 FL_{1}	—	March 25, 2008	Kitt Peak	Spacewatch	HIL · 3:2	7.0 km	MPC · JPL
300987	2008 FT_{8}	—	March 26, 2008	Kitt Peak	Spacewatch	·	3.5 km	MPC · JPL
300988	2008 FW_{11}	—	March 26, 2008	Mount Lemmon	Mount Lemmon Survey	·	3.4 km	MPC · JPL
300989	2008 FK_{16}	—	March 27, 2008	Kitt Peak	Spacewatch	·	3.4 km	MPC · JPL
300990	2008 FN_{29}	—	March 28, 2008	Mount Lemmon	Mount Lemmon Survey	·	3.3 km	MPC · JPL
300991	2008 FF_{41}	—	March 28, 2008	Kitt Peak	Spacewatch	L5	9.1 km	MPC · JPL
300992	2008 FB_{62}	—	March 25, 2008	Kitt Peak	Spacewatch	·	3.0 km	MPC · JPL
300993	2008 FP_{117}	—	March 31, 2008	Kitt Peak	Spacewatch	L5	10 km	MPC · JPL
300994	2008 FS_{134}	—	March 30, 2008	Kitt Peak	Spacewatch	HIL · 3:2	6.8 km	MPC · JPL
300995	2008 GJ_{20}	—	April 8, 2008	Mount Lemmon	Mount Lemmon Survey	·	4.7 km	MPC · JPL
300996	2008 GG_{21}	—	April 7, 2008	Wildberg	R. Apitzsch	·	4.5 km	MPC · JPL
300997	2008 GM_{23}	—	April 1, 2008	Mount Lemmon	Mount Lemmon Survey	·	2.8 km	MPC · JPL
300998	2008 GF_{34}	—	April 3, 2008	Mount Lemmon	Mount Lemmon Survey	·	4.1 km	MPC · JPL
300999	2008 GP_{49}	—	March 12, 2007	Kitt Peak	Spacewatch	L5	9.9 km	MPC · JPL
301000	2008 GG_{69}	—	April 6, 2008	Kitt Peak	Spacewatch	L5	8.7 km	MPC · JPL

back to top

== See also ==
- Meanings of minor-planet names: 300001–301000
