= Meanings of minor-planet names: 300001–301000 =

As minor planet discoveries are confirmed, they are given a permanent number by the IAU's Minor Planet Center (MPC), and the discoverers can then submit names for them, following the IAU's naming conventions. The list below concerns those minor planets in the specified number-range that have received names, and explains the meanings of those names.

Official naming citations of newly named small Solar System bodies are approved and published in a bulletin by IAU's Working Group for Small Bodies Nomenclature (WGSBN). Before May 2021, citations were published in MPC's Minor Planet Circulars for many decades. Recent citations can also be found on the JPL Small-Body Database (SBDB). Until his death in 2016, German astronomer Lutz D. Schmadel compiled these citations into the Dictionary of Minor Planet Names (DMP) and regularly updated the collection.

Based on Paul Herget's The Names of the Minor Planets, Schmadel also researched the unclear origin of numerous asteroids, most of which had been named prior to World War II. This article incorporates text from this source, which is in the public domain: SBDB New namings may only be added to this list below after official publication as the preannouncement of names is condemned. The WGSBN publishes a comprehensive guideline for the naming rules of non-cometary small Solar System bodies.

== 300001–300100 ==
Named minor planet	Provisional	This minor planet was named for...	Ref · Catalog
300082 Moyocoanno	2006 US_{217}	Moyoco Anno (born 1971), a Japanese cartoonist and fashion writer	JPL · 300082

== 300101–300200 ==
back to top

Named minor planet	Provisional	This minor planet was named for...	Ref · Catalog
300124 Alessiazecchini	2006 VG_{14}	Alessia Zecchini (born 1992), an Italian freediver, who set world and domestic records in free diving.	IAU · 300124
300128 Panditjasraj	2006 VP_{32}	Pandit Jasraj (born 1930) is an exponent of Indian Classical vocal music. Jasraj is the recipient of numerous awards, honors, and titles including the prestigious Padma Vibhushan and the Sangeet Natak Akademi Award. His distinctive voice traverses a remarkable four-and-a-half octaves.	JPL · 300128
300150 Lantan	2006 VN_{81}	Lan Tan, an elementary school by the Lan Lake side of the Chiayi City of Taiwan, is known for its natural science and astronomy education. It is also the location of Chia-Yi Amateur Astronomers Association.	IAU · 300150

== 300201–300300 ==
back to top

Named minor planet	Provisional	This minor planet was named for...	Ref · Catalog
300221 Brucebills	2006 XA_{5}	Bruce G. Bills (born 1951), an American planetary scientist and director of JPL's "Asteroids, Comets, and Satellites Group" Scr	JPL · 300221
300226 Francocanepari	2006 XK_{51}	Franco Canepari (born 1953) is the cofounder of Valdinievole Association of Astronomy A. Pieri. His major activity is devoted to the popularization of astronomy at the Planetarium of Monsummano Terme. He is also interested in observations of the Sun and planets.	JPL · 300226
300286 Zintun	2007 OV_{4}	The Sun Moon Lake (Zintun), located in the middle of Taiwan, with an elevation of 748 meters above sea level, is the only natural big lake in Taiwan. The southern part of Lalu Island is shaped like a new moon, and the northern part is shaped like a sun; hence the name Sun Moon Lake.	IAU · 300286
300300 TAM	2007 PL_{12}	The Taipei Astronomical Museum (abbreviated TAM) was the first and is the largest astronomy education and outreach organization in Taiwan.	JPL · 300300

== 300301–300400 ==
back to top

Named minor planet	Provisional	This minor planet was named for...	Ref · Catalog
300334 Antonalexander	2007 RF_{18}	Anton Alexander König (born 2010), son of the discoverer, Michael König and Agathe Schmid-König from Germany	JPL · 300334

== 300401–300500 ==
back to top

Named minor planet	Provisional	This minor planet was named for...	Ref · Catalog
There are no named minor planets in this number range

== 300501–300600 ==
back to top

Named minor planet	Provisional	This minor planet was named for...	Ref · Catalog
There are no named minor planets in this number range

== 300601–300700 ==
back to top

Named minor planet	Provisional	This minor planet was named for...	Ref · Catalog
300634 Chuwenshin	2007 UT_{47}	Chuwenshin (1883–1939), a Chinese astronomer, was a pioneer who used modern scientific methods to study the ancient history of Chinese astronomy systematically and wrote a variety of books on this topic.	IAU · 300634

== 300701–300800 ==
back to top

Named minor planet	Provisional	This minor planet was named for...	Ref · Catalog
There are no named minor planets in this number range

== 300801–300900 ==
back to top

Named minor planet	Provisional	This minor planet was named for...	Ref · Catalog
300821 Margaritasalas	2007 WH_{55}	Margarita Salas Falgueras, prominent Spanish biochemist and molecular geneticist.	IAU · 300821
300854 Changyuin	2007 YV_{31}	Changyuin (1896–1958) was a Chinese astronomer, who established the first educational observatory at Sun Yat-Sen University in China in 1929. He discovered the variable star XX Cam in 1947.	IAU · 300854
300892 Taichung	2008 BT_{15}	Taichung, third largest city of Taiwan	JPL · 300892

== 300901–301000 ==
back to top

Named minor planet	Provisional	This minor planet was named for...	Ref · Catalog
300909 Kenthompson	2008 BZ_{45}	Ken Thompson (born 1943), an American pioneer of computer science	JPL · 300909
300928 Uderzo	2008 CQ_{72}	Albert Uderzo (1927–2020), a French comic book artist, the co-creator of character Asterix.	JPL · 300928
300932 Kyslyuk	2008 CL_{117}	Vitalij Stepanovych Kyslyuk (1940–2014), a Ukrainian astronomer.	JPL · 300932
300933 Teresamarion	2008 CG_{118}	Teresa Marion Sanchez Caldentey (born 1993) is the daughter of astronomer Salvador Sanchez, who helped promote the activities of the Mallorca Observatory and planetarium.	IAU · 300933

back to top

Preceded by 299,001–300,000	Meanings of minor-planet names List of minor planets: 300,001–301,000	Succeeded by 301,001–302,000
