= List of minor planets: 299001–300000 =

The following is a partial list of minor planets, running from minor-planet number 299001 through 300000, inclusive. The primary data for this and other partial lists is based on JPL's "Small-Body Orbital Elements" and data available from the Minor Planet Center. Critical list information is also provided by the MPC, unless otherwise specified from Lowell Observatory. A detailed description of the table's columns and additional sources are given on the main page including a complete list of every page in this series, and a statistical break-up on the dynamical classification of minor planets.

Also see the summary list of all named bodies in numerical and alphabetical order, and the corresponding naming citations for the number range of this particular list. New namings may only be added to this list after official publication, as the preannouncement of names is condemned by the Working Group for Small Bodies Nomenclature of the International Astronomical Union.

Near-Earth obj.	MBA (inner)	MBA (outer)	Centaur
Mars-crosser	MBA (middle)	Jupiter trojan	Trans-Neptunian obj.
Unclassified

== 299001–299100 ==
Designation			Discovery			Properties		Ref
Permanent	Provisional	Named after	Date	Site	Discoverer(s)	Category	Diam.	Ref
299001	2004 XH_{80}	—	December 10, 2004	Socorro	LINEAR	·	1.8 km	MPC · JPL
299002	2004 XN_{87}	—	December 9, 2004	Catalina	CSS	·	1.0 km	MPC · JPL
299003	2004 XP_{87}	—	December 9, 2004	Catalina	CSS	3:2 · SHU	5.9 km	MPC · JPL
299004	2004 XD_{88}	—	December 9, 2004	Kitt Peak	Spacewatch	·	1.5 km	MPC · JPL
299005	2004 XJ_{92}	—	December 11, 2004	Socorro	LINEAR	·	1.5 km	MPC · JPL
299006	2004 XW_{96}	—	December 11, 2004	Kitt Peak	Spacewatch	(194)	2.7 km	MPC · JPL
299007	2004 XA_{100}	—	December 12, 2004	Kitt Peak	Spacewatch	MAS	700 m	MPC · JPL
299008	2004 XQ_{104}	—	December 10, 2004	Socorro	LINEAR	·	1.3 km	MPC · JPL
299009	2004 XD_{106}	—	December 11, 2004	Socorro	LINEAR	·	1.5 km	MPC · JPL
299010	2004 XT_{111}	—	December 9, 2004	Catalina	CSS	ERI	1.5 km	MPC · JPL
299011	2004 XO_{129}	—	December 15, 2004	Kitt Peak	Spacewatch	·	1.6 km	MPC · JPL
299012	2004 XH_{135}	—	December 15, 2004	Socorro	LINEAR	T_{j} (2.95) · HIL	6.1 km	MPC · JPL
299013	2004 XC_{136}	—	December 15, 2004	Socorro	LINEAR	·	1.0 km	MPC · JPL
299014	2004 XT_{143}	—	December 9, 2004	Kitt Peak	Spacewatch	·	1.7 km	MPC · JPL
299015	2004 YB_{4}	—	December 16, 2004	Kitt Peak	Spacewatch	·	1.6 km	MPC · JPL
299016	2004 YC_{4}	—	December 16, 2004	Kitt Peak	Spacewatch	NYS	1.3 km	MPC · JPL
299017	2004 YX_{6}	—	December 18, 2004	Mount Lemmon	Mount Lemmon Survey	MAS	820 m	MPC · JPL
299018	2004 YK_{21}	—	December 18, 2004	Mount Lemmon	Mount Lemmon Survey	MAS	780 m	MPC · JPL
299019	2004 YD_{24}	—	December 16, 2004	Kitt Peak	Spacewatch	·	1.3 km	MPC · JPL
299020 Chennaoui	2005 AR_{3}	Chennaoui	January 5, 2005	Vicques	M. Ory	RAF	1.1 km	MPC · JPL
299021	2005 AW_{3}	—	January 1, 2005	Catalina	CSS	·	1.7 km	MPC · JPL
299022	2005 AP_{12}	—	January 6, 2005	Catalina	CSS	·	1.7 km	MPC · JPL
299023	2005 AO_{15}	—	January 7, 2005	Socorro	LINEAR	·	2.0 km	MPC · JPL
299024	2005 AU_{15}	—	January 6, 2005	Socorro	LINEAR	·	1.8 km	MPC · JPL
299025	2005 AK_{16}	—	January 6, 2005	Socorro	LINEAR	·	1.8 km	MPC · JPL
299026	2005 AL_{17}	—	January 6, 2005	Socorro	LINEAR	·	1.8 km	MPC · JPL
299027	2005 AO_{18}	—	January 7, 2005	Socorro	LINEAR	·	1.7 km	MPC · JPL
299028	2005 AS_{26}	—	January 13, 2005	Mayhill	Lowe, A.	MAS	970 m	MPC · JPL
299029	2005 AU_{27}	—	January 11, 2005	Socorro	LINEAR	EUN	1.7 km	MPC · JPL
299030	2005 AJ_{31}	—	January 11, 2005	Socorro	LINEAR	·	2.0 km	MPC · JPL
299031	2005 AQ_{37}	—	January 13, 2005	Kitt Peak	Spacewatch	·	1.4 km	MPC · JPL
299032	2005 AT_{37}	—	January 13, 2005	Kitt Peak	Spacewatch	·	2.8 km	MPC · JPL
299033	2005 AH_{40}	—	January 15, 2005	Socorro	LINEAR	·	1.8 km	MPC · JPL
299034	2005 AN_{41}	—	January 15, 2005	Socorro	LINEAR	MAS	710 m	MPC · JPL
299035	2005 AT_{51}	—	January 13, 2005	Catalina	CSS	·	2.0 km	MPC · JPL
299036	2005 AV_{52}	—	January 13, 2005	Kitt Peak	Spacewatch	V	850 m	MPC · JPL
299037	2005 AU_{55}	—	January 15, 2005	Socorro	LINEAR	NYS	1.4 km	MPC · JPL
299038	2005 AJ_{58}	—	January 15, 2005	Socorro	LINEAR	NYS	1.5 km	MPC · JPL
299039	2005 AW_{61}	—	January 15, 2005	Kitt Peak	Spacewatch	·	1.5 km	MPC · JPL
299040	2005 AC_{66}	—	January 13, 2005	Kitt Peak	Spacewatch	·	1.0 km	MPC · JPL
299041	2005 AR_{66}	—	January 13, 2005	Kitt Peak	Spacewatch	·	2.3 km	MPC · JPL
299042	2005 AA_{80}	—	January 15, 2005	Kitt Peak	Spacewatch	·	1.5 km	MPC · JPL
299043	2005 BL	—	January 16, 2005	Desert Eagle	W. K. Y. Yeung	V	1.1 km	MPC · JPL
299044	2005 BC_{4}	—	January 16, 2005	Kitt Peak	Spacewatch	·	1.7 km	MPC · JPL
299045	2005 BG_{10}	—	January 16, 2005	Kitt Peak	Spacewatch	·	1.4 km	MPC · JPL
299046	2005 BP_{13}	—	January 17, 2005	Kitt Peak	Spacewatch	·	1.6 km	MPC · JPL
299047	2005 BU_{18}	—	January 16, 2005	Kitt Peak	Spacewatch	·	1.3 km	MPC · JPL
299048	2005 BH_{42}	—	January 16, 2005	Mauna Kea	Veillet, C.	·	1.2 km	MPC · JPL
299049	2005 BL_{49}	—	January 17, 2005	Kitt Peak	Spacewatch	·	1.1 km	MPC · JPL
299050	2005 BS_{49}	—	January 18, 2005	Catalina	CSS	EUN	1.3 km	MPC · JPL
299051	2005 CB_{3}	—	February 1, 2005	Catalina	CSS	·	1.3 km	MPC · JPL
299052	2005 CT_{4}	—	February 1, 2005	Catalina	CSS	·	1.5 km	MPC · JPL
299053	2005 CP_{5}	—	February 1, 2005	Palomar	NEAT	·	1.6 km	MPC · JPL
299054	2005 CJ_{8}	—	February 1, 2005	Catalina	CSS	NYS	1.2 km	MPC · JPL
299055	2005 CK_{8}	—	February 1, 2005	Catalina	CSS	NYS	1.8 km	MPC · JPL
299056	2005 CE_{13}	—	February 2, 2005	Kitt Peak	Spacewatch	·	1.5 km	MPC · JPL
299057	2005 CE_{15}	—	February 2, 2005	Kitt Peak	Spacewatch	·	1.4 km	MPC · JPL
299058	2005 CW_{16}	—	February 2, 2005	Socorro	LINEAR	·	1.3 km	MPC · JPL
299059	2005 CP_{20}	—	February 2, 2005	Catalina	CSS	·	1.7 km	MPC · JPL
299060	2005 CH_{29}	—	February 1, 2005	Kitt Peak	Spacewatch	·	1.6 km	MPC · JPL
299061	2005 CE_{31}	—	February 1, 2005	Kitt Peak	Spacewatch	L5	8.7 km	MPC · JPL
299062	2005 CC_{34}	—	February 2, 2005	Kitt Peak	Spacewatch	L5	10 km	MPC · JPL
299063	2005 CK_{36}	—	February 3, 2005	Socorro	LINEAR	MAR	1.5 km	MPC · JPL
299064	2005 CG_{48}	—	February 2, 2005	Socorro	LINEAR	·	1.4 km	MPC · JPL
299065	2005 CM_{49}	—	February 2, 2005	Catalina	CSS	·	1.7 km	MPC · JPL
299066	2005 CB_{50}	—	February 2, 2005	Socorro	LINEAR	EUN	1.8 km	MPC · JPL
299067	2005 CL_{53}	—	February 3, 2005	Socorro	LINEAR	NYS	1.2 km	MPC · JPL
299068	2005 CH_{60}	—	January 13, 2005	Socorro	LINEAR	EUN	1.5 km	MPC · JPL
299069	2005 CD_{66}	—	February 9, 2005	Socorro	LINEAR	(21344)	2.0 km	MPC · JPL
299070	2005 CS_{66}	—	February 9, 2005	Mount Lemmon	Mount Lemmon Survey	·	870 m	MPC · JPL
299071	2005 CW_{76}	—	February 9, 2005	Anderson Mesa	LONEOS	·	1.5 km	MPC · JPL
299072	2005 DF_{3}	—	February 17, 2005	La Silla	A. Boattini, H. Scholl	·	2.3 km	MPC · JPL
299073	2005 EK_{1}	—	March 3, 2005	Socorro	LINEAR	H	800 m	MPC · JPL
299074	2005 EO_{9}	—	March 2, 2005	Kitt Peak	Spacewatch	·	1.7 km	MPC · JPL
299075	2005 EX_{10}	—	March 2, 2005	Kitt Peak	Spacewatch	(5)	1.3 km	MPC · JPL
299076	2005 EJ_{11}	—	March 2, 2005	Catalina	CSS	·	2.0 km	MPC · JPL
299077	2005 EB_{12}	—	March 2, 2005	Catalina	CSS	·	1.5 km	MPC · JPL
299078	2005 ES_{14}	—	March 3, 2005	Kitt Peak	Spacewatch	526	2.6 km	MPC · JPL
299079	2005 EQ_{25}	—	March 3, 2005	Catalina	CSS	·	1.9 km	MPC · JPL
299080	2005 EG_{27}	—	March 3, 2005	Catalina	CSS	·	1.7 km	MPC · JPL
299081	2005 EK_{39}	—	March 8, 2005	Junk Bond	Junk Bond	·	1.6 km	MPC · JPL
299082	2005 EV_{41}	—	March 2, 2005	Kitt Peak	Spacewatch	·	1.5 km	MPC · JPL
299083	2005 EV_{46}	—	March 3, 2005	Catalina	CSS	·	2.1 km	MPC · JPL
299084	2005 EF_{47}	—	March 3, 2005	Kitt Peak	Spacewatch	·	2.0 km	MPC · JPL
299085	2005 EY_{51}	—	March 3, 2005	Kitt Peak	Spacewatch	HNS	1.5 km	MPC · JPL
299086	2005 EJ_{60}	—	March 4, 2005	Catalina	CSS	·	1.9 km	MPC · JPL
299087	2005 EN_{61}	—	March 4, 2005	Catalina	CSS	·	1.3 km	MPC · JPL
299088	2005 ET_{64}	—	March 4, 2005	Mount Lemmon	Mount Lemmon Survey	·	3.1 km	MPC · JPL
299089	2005 EZ_{64}	—	March 4, 2005	Socorro	LINEAR	(5)	1.6 km	MPC · JPL
299090	2005 EB_{65}	—	March 4, 2005	Socorro	LINEAR	·	3.2 km	MPC · JPL
299091	2005 ES_{67}	—	March 4, 2005	Mount Lemmon	Mount Lemmon Survey	·	2.6 km	MPC · JPL
299092	2005 EV_{69}	—	March 7, 2005	Socorro	LINEAR	H	680 m	MPC · JPL
299093	2005 EJ_{77}	—	March 3, 2005	Kitt Peak	Spacewatch	·	1.1 km	MPC · JPL
299094	2005 EY_{79}	—	March 3, 2005	Catalina	CSS	EUN	1.9 km	MPC · JPL
299095	2005 EW_{81}	—	March 4, 2005	Kitt Peak	Spacewatch	·	1.6 km	MPC · JPL
299096	2005 ET_{82}	—	March 4, 2005	Kitt Peak	Spacewatch	·	1.3 km	MPC · JPL
299097	2005 EP_{88}	—	March 8, 2005	Kitt Peak	Spacewatch	WIT	1.2 km	MPC · JPL
299098	2005 EJ_{90}	—	March 8, 2005	Anderson Mesa	LONEOS	·	3.4 km	MPC · JPL
299099	2005 EQ_{93}	—	March 8, 2005	Socorro	LINEAR	·	3.2 km	MPC · JPL
299100	2005 EC_{98}	—	March 3, 2005	Catalina	CSS	·	1.8 km	MPC · JPL

== 299101–299200 ==
back to top

Designation			Discovery			Properties		Ref
Permanent	Provisional	Named after	Date	Site	Discoverer(s)	Category	Diam.	Ref
299101	2005 EW_{108}	—	March 4, 2005	Catalina	CSS	·	1.5 km	MPC · JPL
299102	2005 EX_{108}	—	March 4, 2005	Catalina	CSS	·	2.9 km	MPC · JPL
299103	2005 EZ_{111}	—	March 4, 2005	Socorro	LINEAR	·	2.3 km	MPC · JPL
299104	2005 ED_{116}	—	March 4, 2005	Mount Lemmon	Mount Lemmon Survey	·	1.4 km	MPC · JPL
299105	2005 EV_{118}	—	March 7, 2005	Socorro	LINEAR	·	2.4 km	MPC · JPL
299106	2005 ED_{129}	—	March 9, 2005	Kitt Peak	Spacewatch	(5)	1.2 km	MPC · JPL
299107	2005 EY_{129}	—	August 30, 1998	Xinglong	SCAP	·	2.1 km	MPC · JPL
299108	2005 EU_{130}	—	March 9, 2005	Anderson Mesa	LONEOS	·	1.3 km	MPC · JPL
299109	2005 EY_{136}	—	March 9, 2005	Mount Lemmon	Mount Lemmon Survey	·	3.3 km	MPC · JPL
299110	2005 EU_{137}	—	March 9, 2005	Socorro	LINEAR	·	2.8 km	MPC · JPL
299111	2005 EZ_{137}	—	March 9, 2005	Mount Lemmon	Mount Lemmon Survey	GEF	1.4 km	MPC · JPL
299112	2005 EQ_{142}	—	March 10, 2005	Catalina	CSS	·	2.8 km	MPC · JPL
299113	2005 EN_{149}	—	March 10, 2005	Kitt Peak	Spacewatch	·	2.1 km	MPC · JPL
299114	2005 ER_{149}	—	March 10, 2005	Kitt Peak	Spacewatch	EUN	1.7 km	MPC · JPL
299115	2005 EP_{156}	—	March 9, 2005	Catalina	CSS	·	1.7 km	MPC · JPL
299116	2005 EH_{157}	—	March 9, 2005	Mount Lemmon	Mount Lemmon Survey	·	1.6 km	MPC · JPL
299117	2005 EX_{160}	—	March 9, 2005	Mount Lemmon	Mount Lemmon Survey	·	2.5 km	MPC · JPL
299118	2005 EG_{162}	—	March 9, 2005	Siding Spring	SSS	·	2.6 km	MPC · JPL
299119	2005 EL_{182}	—	March 9, 2005	Anderson Mesa	LONEOS	H	600 m	MPC · JPL
299120	2005 EW_{184}	—	March 9, 2005	Kitt Peak	Spacewatch	·	1.9 km	MPC · JPL
299121	2005 ES_{188}	—	March 10, 2005	Mount Lemmon	Mount Lemmon Survey	H	650 m	MPC · JPL
299122	2005 EC_{192}	—	March 11, 2005	Mount Lemmon	Mount Lemmon Survey	·	1.7 km	MPC · JPL
299123	2005 EM_{197}	—	March 11, 2005	Mount Lemmon	Mount Lemmon Survey	·	2.1 km	MPC · JPL
299124	2005 EL_{198}	—	March 11, 2005	Mount Lemmon	Mount Lemmon Survey	AEO	1.2 km	MPC · JPL
299125	2005 ER_{199}	—	March 12, 2005	Kitt Peak	Spacewatch	·	2.0 km	MPC · JPL
299126	2005 ED_{207}	—	March 13, 2005	Mount Lemmon	Mount Lemmon Survey	·	1.6 km	MPC · JPL
299127	2005 EF_{213}	—	March 4, 2005	Mount Lemmon	Mount Lemmon Survey	·	2.0 km	MPC · JPL
299128	2005 ET_{214}	—	March 8, 2005	Socorro	LINEAR	·	3.3 km	MPC · JPL
299129	2005 EA_{217}	—	March 9, 2005	Catalina	CSS	·	1.8 km	MPC · JPL
299130	2005 ED_{217}	—	March 9, 2005	Catalina	CSS	MAR	1.8 km	MPC · JPL
299131	2005 EM_{217}	—	March 9, 2005	Socorro	LINEAR	·	1.3 km	MPC · JPL
299132	2005 EH_{221}	—	March 11, 2005	Mount Lemmon	Mount Lemmon Survey	H	710 m	MPC · JPL
299133	2005 ER_{221}	—	March 12, 2005	Socorro	LINEAR	·	2.6 km	MPC · JPL
299134 Moggicecchi	2005 EB_{224}	Moggicecchi	March 10, 2005	San Marcello	L. Tesi, Fagioli, G.	·	1.2 km	MPC · JPL
299135	2005 ES_{237}	—	March 11, 2005	Kitt Peak	Spacewatch	·	1.8 km	MPC · JPL
299136	2005 EY_{237}	—	March 11, 2005	Kitt Peak	Spacewatch	·	3.2 km	MPC · JPL
299137	2005 EV_{239}	—	March 11, 2005	Kitt Peak	Spacewatch	·	1.4 km	MPC · JPL
299138	2005 EA_{240}	—	March 11, 2005	Kitt Peak	Spacewatch	·	1.2 km	MPC · JPL
299139	2005 EW_{241}	—	March 11, 2005	Catalina	CSS	·	2.3 km	MPC · JPL
299140	2005 EH_{243}	—	March 11, 2005	Catalina	CSS	H	610 m	MPC · JPL
299141	2005 EN_{246}	—	March 12, 2005	Kitt Peak	Spacewatch	WIT	1.0 km	MPC · JPL
299142	2005 EN_{247}	—	March 12, 2005	Kitt Peak	Spacewatch	·	1.9 km	MPC · JPL
299143	2005 ED_{260}	—	March 11, 2005	Kitt Peak	Spacewatch	AGN	1.2 km	MPC · JPL
299144	2005 EG_{264}	—	March 13, 2005	Kitt Peak	Spacewatch	GEF	1.3 km	MPC · JPL
299145	2005 EE_{266}	—	March 13, 2005	Kitt Peak	Spacewatch	·	1.3 km	MPC · JPL
299146	2005 EU_{266}	—	March 13, 2005	Kitt Peak	Spacewatch	HNS	1.9 km	MPC · JPL
299147	2005 EH_{270}	—	March 12, 2005	Socorro	LINEAR	H	770 m	MPC · JPL
299148	2005 EK_{273}	—	March 3, 2005	Kitt Peak	Spacewatch	·	2.3 km	MPC · JPL
299149	2005 EA_{276}	—	March 8, 2005	Catalina	CSS	JUN	1.3 km	MPC · JPL
299150	2005 EM_{279}	—	March 10, 2005	Catalina	CSS	JUN	1.6 km	MPC · JPL
299151	2005 EB_{284}	—	March 11, 2005	Anderson Mesa	LONEOS	·	3.0 km	MPC · JPL
299152	2005 EG_{290}	—	March 9, 2005	Mount Lemmon	Mount Lemmon Survey	·	2.7 km	MPC · JPL
299153	2005 EX_{298}	—	March 11, 2005	Kitt Peak	M. W. Buie	·	1.3 km	MPC · JPL
299154	2005 EQ_{323}	—	March 13, 2005	Mount Lemmon	Mount Lemmon Survey	ADE	2.5 km	MPC · JPL
299155	2005 EK_{330}	—	March 3, 2005	Catalina	CSS	·	2.1 km	MPC · JPL
299156	2005 FD_{4}	—	March 18, 2005	Catalina	CSS	·	2.7 km	MPC · JPL
299157	2005 FO_{11}	—	March 30, 2005	Catalina	CSS	·	3.2 km	MPC · JPL
299158	2005 GD_{6}	—	April 1, 2005	Kitt Peak	Spacewatch	·	2.0 km	MPC · JPL
299159	2005 GF_{7}	—	April 1, 2005	Kitt Peak	Spacewatch	·	2.1 km	MPC · JPL
299160	2005 GK_{12}	—	April 1, 2005	Kitt Peak	Spacewatch	·	2.2 km	MPC · JPL
299161	2005 GL_{12}	—	April 1, 2005	Anderson Mesa	LONEOS	·	3.1 km	MPC · JPL
299162	2005 GM_{12}	—	April 1, 2005	Anderson Mesa	LONEOS	GEF	2.1 km	MPC · JPL
299163	2005 GF_{15}	—	April 2, 2005	Mount Lemmon	Mount Lemmon Survey	·	1.2 km	MPC · JPL
299164	2005 GD_{19}	—	April 2, 2005	Palomar	NEAT	MIS	3.0 km	MPC · JPL
299165	2005 GT_{20}	—	April 2, 2005	Mount Lemmon	Mount Lemmon Survey	·	2.5 km	MPC · JPL
299166	2005 GC_{28}	—	April 3, 2005	Palomar	NEAT	·	2.6 km	MPC · JPL
299167	2005 GL_{36}	—	April 2, 2005	Mount Lemmon	Mount Lemmon Survey	·	2.0 km	MPC · JPL
299168	2005 GJ_{37}	—	April 2, 2005	Mount Lemmon	Mount Lemmon Survey	EUN	1.3 km	MPC · JPL
299169	2005 GR_{37}	—	April 2, 2005	Siding Spring	SSS	·	2.0 km	MPC · JPL
299170	2005 GX_{40}	—	April 4, 2005	Mount Lemmon	Mount Lemmon Survey	AGN	1.5 km	MPC · JPL
299171	2005 GC_{47}	—	April 5, 2005	Mount Lemmon	Mount Lemmon Survey	(5)	1.7 km	MPC · JPL
299172	2005 GR_{49}	—	April 5, 2005	Mount Lemmon	Mount Lemmon Survey	·	1.7 km	MPC · JPL
299173	2005 GH_{56}	—	April 6, 2005	Mount Lemmon	Mount Lemmon Survey	·	2.2 km	MPC · JPL
299174	2005 GK_{58}	—	April 6, 2005	Mount Lemmon	Mount Lemmon Survey	·	2.9 km	MPC · JPL
299175	2005 GT_{60}	—	April 6, 2005	Vail-Jarnac	Jarnac	·	3.2 km	MPC · JPL
299176	2005 GM_{71}	—	April 4, 2005	Catalina	CSS	GEF	1.8 km	MPC · JPL
299177	2005 GW_{74}	—	April 5, 2005	Catalina	CSS	·	3.0 km	MPC · JPL
299178	2005 GC_{76}	—	April 5, 2005	Catalina	CSS	H	760 m	MPC · JPL
299179	2005 GG_{77}	—	April 6, 2005	Kitt Peak	Spacewatch	·	2.0 km	MPC · JPL
299180	2005 GB_{81}	—	April 7, 2005	Kitt Peak	Spacewatch	(5)	1.3 km	MPC · JPL
299181	2005 GW_{92}	—	April 6, 2005	Mount Lemmon	Mount Lemmon Survey	·	1.9 km	MPC · JPL
299182	2005 GW_{97}	—	April 7, 2005	Kitt Peak	Spacewatch	·	2.3 km	MPC · JPL
299183	2005 GN_{105}	—	April 10, 2005	Kitt Peak	Spacewatch	·	1.3 km	MPC · JPL
299184	2005 GY_{105}	—	April 10, 2005	Kitt Peak	Spacewatch	·	2.0 km	MPC · JPL
299185	2005 GV_{109}	—	April 10, 2005	Mount Lemmon	Mount Lemmon Survey	·	3.1 km	MPC · JPL
299186	2005 GH_{115}	—	April 10, 2005	Mount Lemmon	Mount Lemmon Survey	(5)	1.6 km	MPC · JPL
299187	2005 GU_{118}	—	April 11, 2005	Mount Lemmon	Mount Lemmon Survey	HNS	1.9 km	MPC · JPL
299188	2005 GO_{127}	—	April 12, 2005	Mount Lemmon	Mount Lemmon Survey	EUN	1.3 km	MPC · JPL
299189	2005 GT_{127}	—	April 12, 2005	Socorro	LINEAR	H	670 m	MPC · JPL
299190	2005 GB_{134}	—	April 10, 2005	Kitt Peak	Spacewatch	·	3.8 km	MPC · JPL
299191	2005 GZ_{136}	—	April 10, 2005	Kitt Peak	Spacewatch	·	2.7 km	MPC · JPL
299192	2005 GV_{141}	—	April 9, 2005	Mount Lemmon	Mount Lemmon Survey	·	1.5 km	MPC · JPL
299193	2005 GA_{146}	—	April 11, 2005	Kitt Peak	Spacewatch	GEF	1.5 km	MPC · JPL
299194	2005 GG_{146}	—	April 11, 2005	Kitt Peak	Spacewatch	·	2.1 km	MPC · JPL
299195	2005 GP_{148}	—	April 11, 2005	Mount Lemmon	Mount Lemmon Survey	·	3.3 km	MPC · JPL
299196	2005 GP_{163}	—	April 10, 2005	Mount Lemmon	Mount Lemmon Survey	·	1.8 km	MPC · JPL
299197	2005 GJ_{165}	—	April 11, 2005	Kitt Peak	Spacewatch	·	2.3 km	MPC · JPL
299198	2005 GQ_{172}	—	April 14, 2005	Kitt Peak	Spacewatch	·	2.1 km	MPC · JPL
299199	2005 GN_{206}	—	April 12, 2005	Kitt Peak	M. W. Buie	·	2.3 km	MPC · JPL
299200	2005 GB_{219}	—	April 2, 2005	Mount Lemmon	Mount Lemmon Survey	AGN	1.5 km	MPC · JPL

== 299201–299300 ==
back to top

Designation			Discovery			Properties		Ref
Permanent	Provisional	Named after	Date	Site	Discoverer(s)	Category	Diam.	Ref
299201	2005 GN_{222}	—	April 10, 2005	Kitt Peak	Spacewatch	·	2.2 km	MPC · JPL
299202	2005 HR_{1}	—	April 16, 2005	Catalina	CSS	(18466)	2.5 km	MPC · JPL
299203	2005 HY_{2}	—	April 18, 2005	Cordell-Lorenz	D. T. Durig	·	2.5 km	MPC · JPL
299204	2005 HV_{6}	—	April 30, 2005	Kitt Peak	Spacewatch	·	2.6 km	MPC · JPL
299205	2005 HN_{9}	—	April 17, 2005	Kitt Peak	Spacewatch	·	2.1 km	MPC · JPL
299206	2005 JO_{11}	—	May 4, 2005	Mauna Kea	Veillet, C.	·	1.3 km	MPC · JPL
299207	2005 JO_{23}	—	May 3, 2005	Kitt Peak	Spacewatch	H	710 m	MPC · JPL
299208	2005 JG_{36}	—	May 4, 2005	Kitt Peak	Spacewatch	·	2.9 km	MPC · JPL
299209	2005 JN_{36}	—	May 4, 2005	Catalina	CSS	·	3.0 km	MPC · JPL
299210	2005 JO_{37}	—	May 6, 2005	Mount Lemmon	Mount Lemmon Survey	HNS	1.3 km	MPC · JPL
299211	2005 JH_{43}	—	May 8, 2005	Mount Lemmon	Mount Lemmon Survey	AGN	1.5 km	MPC · JPL
299212	2005 JN_{48}	—	May 3, 2005	Kitt Peak	Spacewatch	·	2.2 km	MPC · JPL
299213	2005 JN_{50}	—	May 4, 2005	Kitt Peak	Spacewatch	·	2.0 km	MPC · JPL
299214	2005 JO_{50}	—	May 4, 2005	Kitt Peak	Spacewatch	HOF	3.1 km	MPC · JPL
299215	2005 JQ_{52}	—	May 4, 2005	Mount Lemmon	Mount Lemmon Survey	HOF	2.9 km	MPC · JPL
299216	2005 JY_{62}	—	May 9, 2005	Mount Lemmon	Mount Lemmon Survey	KOR	1.4 km	MPC · JPL
299217	2005 JV_{71}	—	May 8, 2005	Anderson Mesa	LONEOS	·	3.5 km	MPC · JPL
299218	2005 JR_{74}	—	May 8, 2005	Mount Lemmon	Mount Lemmon Survey	AST	1.9 km	MPC · JPL
299219	2005 JP_{75}	—	May 9, 2005	Socorro	LINEAR	·	2.5 km	MPC · JPL
299220	2005 JA_{78}	—	May 10, 2005	Kitt Peak	Spacewatch	(16286)	2.9 km	MPC · JPL
299221	2005 JJ_{79}	—	May 10, 2005	Mount Lemmon	Mount Lemmon Survey	·	2.2 km	MPC · JPL
299222	2005 JZ_{86}	—	May 9, 2005	Mount Lemmon	Mount Lemmon Survey	·	1.6 km	MPC · JPL
299223	2005 JD_{93}	—	May 11, 2005	Palomar	NEAT	·	2.3 km	MPC · JPL
299224	2005 JG_{93}	—	May 11, 2005	Palomar	NEAT	·	1.9 km	MPC · JPL
299225	2005 JL_{97}	—	May 8, 2005	Kitt Peak	Spacewatch	·	2.4 km	MPC · JPL
299226	2005 JE_{110}	—	May 8, 2005	Mount Lemmon	Mount Lemmon Survey	·	2.1 km	MPC · JPL
299227	2005 JQ_{113}	—	May 10, 2005	Kitt Peak	Spacewatch	·	1.5 km	MPC · JPL
299228	2005 JH_{119}	—	May 10, 2005	Kitt Peak	Spacewatch	HOF	3.1 km	MPC · JPL
299229	2005 JB_{123}	—	May 11, 2005	Kitt Peak	Spacewatch	·	2.2 km	MPC · JPL
299230	2005 JR_{130}	—	May 13, 2005	Mount Lemmon	Mount Lemmon Survey	AGN	1.5 km	MPC · JPL
299231	2005 JT_{130}	—	May 13, 2005	Mount Lemmon	Mount Lemmon Survey	·	2.1 km	MPC · JPL
299232	2005 JJ_{132}	—	May 13, 2005	Siding Spring	SSS	·	3.0 km	MPC · JPL
299233	2005 JO_{150}	—	May 3, 2005	Kitt Peak	Spacewatch	·	1.9 km	MPC · JPL
299234	2005 KP	—	May 16, 2005	Mount Lemmon	Mount Lemmon Survey	·	2.0 km	MPC · JPL
299235	2005 LH_{14}	—	June 4, 2005	Kitt Peak	Spacewatch	·	3.4 km	MPC · JPL
299236	2005 LM_{29}	—	May 11, 2005	Palomar	NEAT	·	2.9 km	MPC · JPL
299237	2005 LT_{43}	—	June 11, 2005	Kitt Peak	Spacewatch	·	2.1 km	MPC · JPL
299238	2005 LP_{48}	—	June 14, 2005	Anderson Mesa	LONEOS	T_{j} (2.98)	7.4 km	MPC · JPL
299239	2005 MZ_{7}	—	June 27, 2005	Kitt Peak	Spacewatch	TIR	4.2 km	MPC · JPL
299240	2005 MU_{15}	—	June 30, 2005	Junk Bond	D. Healy	·	3.8 km	MPC · JPL
299241	2005 ME_{20}	—	June 29, 2005	Kitt Peak	Spacewatch	·	3.6 km	MPC · JPL
299242	2005 ME_{22}	—	June 30, 2005	Kitt Peak	Spacewatch	·	3.6 km	MPC · JPL
299243	2005 MP_{22}	—	June 30, 2005	Kitt Peak	Spacewatch	·	3.0 km	MPC · JPL
299244	2005 MY_{28}	—	June 29, 2005	Kitt Peak	Spacewatch	·	3.5 km	MPC · JPL
299245	2005 MB_{29}	—	June 29, 2005	Kitt Peak	Spacewatch	·	3.2 km	MPC · JPL
299246	2005 MR_{37}	—	June 30, 2005	Kitt Peak	Spacewatch	·	3.1 km	MPC · JPL
299247	2005 MR_{38}	—	June 30, 2005	Kitt Peak	Spacewatch	EOS	2.4 km	MPC · JPL
299248	2005 MW_{39}	—	June 29, 2005	Palomar	NEAT	·	3.9 km	MPC · JPL
299249	2005 MO_{42}	—	June 29, 2005	Kitt Peak	Spacewatch	·	4.2 km	MPC · JPL
299250	2005 MZ_{46}	—	June 28, 2005	Palomar	NEAT	·	4.4 km	MPC · JPL
299251	2005 MN_{50}	—	June 30, 2005	Palomar	NEAT	·	3.5 km	MPC · JPL
299252	2005 MV_{53}	—	June 17, 2005	Siding Spring	SSS	T_{j} (2.98)	5.6 km	MPC · JPL
299253	2005 NO_{5}	—	July 3, 2005	Mount Lemmon	Mount Lemmon Survey	·	2.7 km	MPC · JPL
299254	2005 NU_{7}	—	July 1, 2005	Kitt Peak	Spacewatch	·	4.1 km	MPC · JPL
299255	2005 NN_{8}	—	July 1, 2005	Kitt Peak	Spacewatch	VER	2.9 km	MPC · JPL
299256	2005 NS_{11}	—	July 4, 2005	Palomar	NEAT	·	5.7 km	MPC · JPL
299257	2005 NG_{24}	—	July 4, 2005	Kitt Peak	Spacewatch	·	3.7 km	MPC · JPL
299258	2005 NK_{36}	—	July 5, 2005	Palomar	NEAT	EOS	2.2 km	MPC · JPL
299259	2005 NZ_{42}	—	July 5, 2005	Palomar	NEAT	·	2.6 km	MPC · JPL
299260	2005 NE_{43}	—	July 5, 2005	Palomar	NEAT	·	3.7 km	MPC · JPL
299261	2005 NM_{48}	—	July 7, 2005	Kitt Peak	Spacewatch	·	3.8 km	MPC · JPL
299262	2005 NT_{51}	—	July 8, 2005	Kitt Peak	Spacewatch	·	3.2 km	MPC · JPL
299263	2005 NF_{58}	—	July 6, 2005	Kitt Peak	Spacewatch	EOS	2.7 km	MPC · JPL
299264	2005 NT_{58}	—	July 9, 2005	Kitt Peak	Spacewatch	·	2.5 km	MPC · JPL
299265	2005 NJ_{60}	—	July 9, 2005	Kitt Peak	Spacewatch	·	2.8 km	MPC · JPL
299266	2005 NS_{61}	—	July 11, 2005	Kitt Peak	Spacewatch	·	4.9 km	MPC · JPL
299267	2005 NZ_{63}	—	July 1, 2005	Kitt Peak	Spacewatch	·	3.2 km	MPC · JPL
299268	2005 NS_{75}	—	July 10, 2005	Kitt Peak	Spacewatch	THM	2.1 km	MPC · JPL
299269	2005 NR_{78}	—	July 12, 2005	Mount Lemmon	Mount Lemmon Survey	·	2.0 km	MPC · JPL
299270	2005 NW_{82}	—	July 10, 2005	Reedy Creek	J. Broughton	·	3.1 km	MPC · JPL
299271	2005 NU_{85}	—	July 3, 2005	Mount Lemmon	Mount Lemmon Survey	·	4.5 km	MPC · JPL
299272	2005 NE_{99}	—	July 10, 2005	Kitt Peak	Spacewatch	·	2.2 km	MPC · JPL
299273	2005 NQ_{100}	—	July 5, 2005	Kitt Peak	Spacewatch	·	3.9 km	MPC · JPL
299274	2005 NO_{122}	—	July 3, 2005	Mount Lemmon	Mount Lemmon Survey	·	2.5 km	MPC · JPL
299275	2005 NT_{122}	—	July 3, 2005	Siding Spring	SSS	T_{j} (2.98)	4.3 km	MPC · JPL
299276	2005 NF_{123}	—	July 8, 2005	Anderson Mesa	LONEOS	THB	5.0 km	MPC · JPL
299277	2005 NN_{123}	—	July 9, 2005	Kitt Peak	Spacewatch	EOS	2.7 km	MPC · JPL
299278	2005 OD	—	July 16, 2005	Reedy Creek	J. Broughton	·	4.4 km	MPC · JPL
299279	2005 OY_{2}	—	July 30, 2005	Socorro	LINEAR	·	6.0 km	MPC · JPL
299280	2005 OJ_{5}	—	July 28, 2005	Palomar	NEAT	·	3.0 km	MPC · JPL
299281	2005 ON_{16}	—	July 29, 2005	Palomar	NEAT	·	2.9 km	MPC · JPL
299282	2005 OX_{16}	—	July 30, 2005	Palomar	NEAT	·	4.0 km	MPC · JPL
299283	2005 OD_{18}	—	July 30, 2005	Palomar	NEAT	·	3.9 km	MPC · JPL
299284	2005 OK_{27}	—	July 30, 2005	Palomar	NEAT	·	6.2 km	MPC · JPL
299285	2005 OL_{31}	—	July 27, 2005	Siding Spring	SSS	TIR	4.3 km	MPC · JPL
299286	2005 PO_{7}	—	August 4, 2005	Palomar	NEAT	THM	2.7 km	MPC · JPL
299287	2005 PB_{10}	—	August 4, 2005	Palomar	NEAT	·	3.4 km	MPC · JPL
299288	2005 PJ_{11}	—	August 4, 2005	Palomar	NEAT	·	2.2 km	MPC · JPL
299289	2005 PV_{11}	—	August 4, 2005	Palomar	NEAT	VER	3.6 km	MPC · JPL
299290	2005 PQ_{14}	—	August 4, 2005	Palomar	NEAT	·	3.5 km	MPC · JPL
299291	2005 PK_{17}	—	August 13, 2005	Wrightwood	J. W. Young	·	5.6 km	MPC · JPL
299292	2005 PZ_{18}	—	August 1, 2005	Siding Spring	SSS	VER	5.9 km	MPC · JPL
299293	2005 QJ	—	August 23, 2005	Pla D'Arguines	R. Ferrando	EOS	2.8 km	MPC · JPL
299294	2005 QR_{1}	—	August 22, 2005	Palomar	NEAT	·	2.9 km	MPC · JPL
299295	2005 QT_{1}	—	August 22, 2005	Palomar	NEAT	·	4.4 km	MPC · JPL
299296	2005 QF_{6}	—	August 24, 2005	Palomar	NEAT	·	5.6 km	MPC · JPL
299297	2005 QV_{13}	—	August 24, 2005	Palomar	NEAT	·	3.9 km	MPC · JPL
299298	2005 QN_{29}	—	August 26, 2005	Palomar	NEAT	VER	3.5 km	MPC · JPL
299299	2005 QL_{31}	—	August 22, 2005	Haleakala	NEAT	·	4.5 km	MPC · JPL
299300	2005 QN_{34}	—	August 25, 2005	Palomar	NEAT	·	5.1 km	MPC · JPL

== 299301–299400 ==
back to top

Designation			Discovery			Properties		Ref
Permanent	Provisional	Named after	Date	Site	Discoverer(s)	Category	Diam.	Ref
299301	2005 QX_{37}	—	August 25, 2005	Palomar	NEAT	EUP	9.2 km	MPC · JPL
299302	2005 QD_{41}	—	August 26, 2005	Anderson Mesa	LONEOS	·	4.5 km	MPC · JPL
299303	2005 QO_{47}	—	August 26, 2005	Palomar	NEAT	·	3.3 km	MPC · JPL
299304	2005 QX_{48}	—	August 26, 2005	Palomar	NEAT	·	4.5 km	MPC · JPL
299305	2005 QL_{49}	—	August 26, 2005	Palomar	NEAT	·	3.6 km	MPC · JPL
299306	2005 QQ_{49}	—	August 26, 2005	Palomar	NEAT	·	5.7 km	MPC · JPL
299307	2005 QL_{50}	—	August 26, 2005	Palomar	NEAT	VER	2.9 km	MPC · JPL
299308	2005 QM_{50}	—	August 26, 2005	Palomar	NEAT	·	4.5 km	MPC · JPL
299309	2005 QZ_{52}	—	August 28, 2005	Kitt Peak	Spacewatch	·	3.9 km	MPC · JPL
299310	2005 QF_{63}	—	August 26, 2005	Palomar	NEAT	·	3.5 km	MPC · JPL
299311	2005 QF_{72}	—	August 29, 2005	Anderson Mesa	LONEOS	THM	2.6 km	MPC · JPL
299312	2005 QN_{84}	—	August 30, 2005	St. Véran	St. Veran	·	5.1 km	MPC · JPL
299313	2005 QZ_{84}	—	August 30, 2005	Kitt Peak	Spacewatch	·	3.5 km	MPC · JPL
299314	2005 QH_{90}	—	August 25, 2005	Palomar	NEAT	·	4.6 km	MPC · JPL
299315	2005 QU_{94}	—	August 27, 2005	Palomar	NEAT	·	4.0 km	MPC · JPL
299316	2005 QY_{94}	—	August 27, 2005	Palomar	NEAT	·	3.6 km	MPC · JPL
299317	2005 QM_{96}	—	August 27, 2005	Palomar	NEAT	·	3.2 km	MPC · JPL
299318	2005 QX_{99}	—	August 27, 2005	Palomar	NEAT	·	3.3 km	MPC · JPL
299319	2005 QP_{103}	—	August 27, 2005	Palomar	NEAT	EOS	2.2 km	MPC · JPL
299320	2005 QB_{104}	—	August 27, 2005	Palomar	NEAT	VER	2.9 km	MPC · JPL
299321	2005 QU_{108}	—	August 27, 2005	Palomar	NEAT	·	3.1 km	MPC · JPL
299322	2005 QB_{112}	—	August 27, 2005	Palomar	NEAT	·	4.4 km	MPC · JPL
299323	2005 QX_{118}	—	August 28, 2005	Kitt Peak	Spacewatch	·	2.6 km	MPC · JPL
299324	2005 QM_{136}	—	August 28, 2005	Kitt Peak	Spacewatch	·	4.7 km	MPC · JPL
299325	2005 QR_{141}	—	August 30, 2005	Kitt Peak	Spacewatch	HYG	3.6 km	MPC · JPL
299326	2005 QV_{153}	—	August 27, 2005	Palomar	NEAT	·	4.5 km	MPC · JPL
299327	2005 QG_{160}	—	August 28, 2005	Anderson Mesa	LONEOS	T_{j} (2.99) · EUP	7.7 km	MPC · JPL
299328	2005 QL_{166}	—	August 24, 2005	Palomar	NEAT	EOS	2.4 km	MPC · JPL
299329	2005 QE_{172}	—	August 29, 2005	Palomar	NEAT	·	4.8 km	MPC · JPL
299330	2005 QE_{174}	—	August 31, 2005	Kitt Peak	Spacewatch	·	4.0 km	MPC · JPL
299331	2005 QN_{174}	—	August 31, 2005	Anderson Mesa	LONEOS	EUP	4.6 km	MPC · JPL
299332	2005 QK_{183}	—	August 29, 2005	Palomar	NEAT	·	4.1 km	MPC · JPL
299333	2005 QF_{187}	—	August 30, 2005	Kitt Peak	Spacewatch	·	3.1 km	MPC · JPL
299334	2005 QY_{187}	—	August 29, 2005	Kitt Peak	Spacewatch	·	3.6 km	MPC · JPL
299335	2005 RL_{1}	—	September 1, 2005	Palomar	NEAT	EOS	2.8 km	MPC · JPL
299336	2005 RG_{7}	—	September 7, 2005	Campo Catino	Campo Catino Austral Observatory Survey	·	4.6 km	MPC · JPL
299337	2005 RZ_{19}	—	September 1, 2005	Kitt Peak	Spacewatch	THB	3.6 km	MPC · JPL
299338	2005 RN_{42}	—	September 13, 2005	Kitt Peak	Spacewatch	·	3.6 km	MPC · JPL
299339	2005 RZ_{43}	—	September 12, 2005	Socorro	LINEAR	URS	5.1 km	MPC · JPL
299340	2005 SP_{16}	—	September 26, 2005	Kitt Peak	Spacewatch	VER	3.1 km	MPC · JPL
299341	2005 SK_{18}	—	September 26, 2005	Kitt Peak	Spacewatch	VER	4.6 km	MPC · JPL
299342	2005 SS_{101}	—	September 25, 2005	Kitt Peak	Spacewatch	·	1.1 km	MPC · JPL
299343	2005 SH_{124}	—	September 29, 2005	Anderson Mesa	LONEOS	·	4.9 km	MPC · JPL
299344	2005 SX_{141}	—	September 25, 2005	Kitt Peak	Spacewatch	THM	2.7 km	MPC · JPL
299345	2005 SE_{153}	—	September 25, 2005	Kitt Peak	Spacewatch	CYB	4.6 km	MPC · JPL
299346	2005 SG_{177}	—	September 29, 2005	Kitt Peak	Spacewatch	·	1.2 km	MPC · JPL
299347	2005 SO_{177}	—	September 29, 2005	Kitt Peak	Spacewatch	CYB	3.6 km	MPC · JPL
299348	2005 SU_{179}	—	September 29, 2005	Anderson Mesa	LONEOS	TIR	4.1 km	MPC · JPL
299349	2005 SG_{196}	—	September 30, 2005	Kitt Peak	Spacewatch	·	3.1 km	MPC · JPL
299350	2005 SK_{196}	—	September 30, 2005	Kitt Peak	Spacewatch	·	3.4 km	MPC · JPL
299351	2005 ST_{209}	—	September 30, 2005	Palomar	NEAT	·	5.3 km	MPC · JPL
299352	2005 SQ_{225}	—	September 29, 2005	Kitt Peak	Spacewatch	CYB	3.4 km	MPC · JPL
299353	2005 SR_{235}	—	September 29, 2005	Kitt Peak	Spacewatch	CYB	5.7 km	MPC · JPL
299354	2005 SM_{242}	—	September 30, 2005	Kitt Peak	Spacewatch	·	3.7 km	MPC · JPL
299355	2005 SX_{249}	—	September 23, 2005	Catalina	CSS	·	4.5 km	MPC · JPL
299356	2005 SG_{251}	—	September 24, 2005	Palomar	NEAT	·	3.7 km	MPC · JPL
299357	2005 SB_{252}	—	September 24, 2005	Palomar	NEAT	·	5.8 km	MPC · JPL
299358	2005 SP_{255}	—	September 22, 2005	Palomar	NEAT	·	5.2 km	MPC · JPL
299359	2005 SG_{259}	—	September 24, 2005	Anderson Mesa	LONEOS	·	6.7 km	MPC · JPL
299360	2005 SR_{267}	—	September 30, 2005	Palomar	NEAT	·	4.3 km	MPC · JPL
299361	2005 TT_{21}	—	October 1, 2005	Kitt Peak	Spacewatch	(31811)	4.1 km	MPC · JPL
299362 Marthacole	2005 TK_{27}	Marthacole	October 1, 2005	Catalina	CSS	·	1.2 km	MPC · JPL
299363	2005 TV_{47}	—	October 5, 2005	Bergisch Gladbach	W. Bickel	·	3.7 km	MPC · JPL
299364	2005 TD_{83}	—	October 3, 2005	Socorro	LINEAR	·	4.6 km	MPC · JPL
299365	2005 TE_{99}	—	October 7, 2005	Catalina	CSS	·	5.5 km	MPC · JPL
299366	2005 TZ_{190}	—	October 7, 2005	Catalina	CSS	·	4.3 km	MPC · JPL
299367	2005 UA_{41}	—	October 24, 2005	Kitt Peak	Spacewatch	·	670 m	MPC · JPL
299368	2005 UL_{84}	—	October 22, 2005	Kitt Peak	Spacewatch	CYB	4.0 km	MPC · JPL
299369	2005 UJ_{168}	—	October 24, 2005	Kitt Peak	Spacewatch	·	1.0 km	MPC · JPL
299370	2005 UT_{193}	—	October 22, 2005	Kitt Peak	Spacewatch	CYB	3.9 km	MPC · JPL
299371	2005 UD_{217}	—	October 27, 2005	Socorro	LINEAR	·	5.0 km	MPC · JPL
299372	2005 UA_{225}	—	October 25, 2005	Kitt Peak	Spacewatch	SYL · CYB	4.6 km	MPC · JPL
299373	2005 UV_{241}	—	October 25, 2005	Kitt Peak	Spacewatch	·	810 m	MPC · JPL
299374	2005 UB_{261}	—	October 25, 2005	Mount Lemmon	Mount Lemmon Survey	·	890 m	MPC · JPL
299375	2005 UL_{268}	—	October 28, 2005	Socorro	LINEAR	·	1.1 km	MPC · JPL
299376	2005 UG_{371}	—	October 27, 2005	Mount Lemmon	Mount Lemmon Survey	·	810 m	MPC · JPL
299377	2005 UT_{388}	—	October 27, 2005	Kitt Peak	Spacewatch	·	1.1 km	MPC · JPL
299378	2005 UL_{425}	—	October 28, 2005	Kitt Peak	Spacewatch	CYB	5.1 km	MPC · JPL
299379	2005 UR_{500}	—	October 27, 2005	Anderson Mesa	LONEOS	CYB	6.4 km	MPC · JPL
299380	2005 UT_{508}	—	October 24, 2005	Kitt Peak	Spacewatch	·	1.0 km	MPC · JPL
299381	2005 UP_{515}	—	October 22, 2005	Apache Point	A. C. Becker	T_{j} (2.98) · CYB	5.2 km	MPC · JPL
299382	2005 VF_{3}	—	November 5, 2005	Catalina	CSS	·	920 m	MPC · JPL
299383	2005 VC_{73}	—	November 1, 2005	Mount Lemmon	Mount Lemmon Survey	·	830 m	MPC · JPL
299384	2005 VM_{135}	—	November 6, 2005	Mount Lemmon	Mount Lemmon Survey	·	890 m	MPC · JPL
299385	2005 WA_{14}	—	November 22, 2005	Kitt Peak	Spacewatch	·	540 m	MPC · JPL
299386	2005 WP_{20}	—	November 21, 2005	Kitt Peak	Spacewatch	·	830 m	MPC · JPL
299387	2005 WH_{28}	—	November 21, 2005	Kitt Peak	Spacewatch	·	820 m	MPC · JPL
299388	2005 WO_{87}	—	November 28, 2005	Mount Lemmon	Mount Lemmon Survey	·	1.5 km	MPC · JPL
299389	2005 WM_{88}	—	November 28, 2005	Mount Lemmon	Mount Lemmon Survey	·	1.2 km	MPC · JPL
299390	2005 WU_{88}	—	October 1, 2005	Mount Lemmon	Mount Lemmon Survey	EOS	2.2 km	MPC · JPL
299391	2005 WE_{130}	—	November 25, 2005	Mount Lemmon	Mount Lemmon Survey	·	910 m	MPC · JPL
299392	2005 WY_{140}	—	November 26, 2005	Mount Lemmon	Mount Lemmon Survey	·	790 m	MPC · JPL
299393	2005 WY_{142}	—	November 29, 2005	Catalina	CSS	·	900 m	MPC · JPL
299394	2005 WT_{152}	—	November 29, 2005	Kitt Peak	Spacewatch	·	1.3 km	MPC · JPL
299395	2005 WN_{163}	—	November 29, 2005	Kitt Peak	Spacewatch	·	780 m	MPC · JPL
299396	2005 XD_{33}	—	December 4, 2005	Kitt Peak	Spacewatch	·	760 m	MPC · JPL
299397	2005 XP_{42}	—	December 5, 2005	Mount Lemmon	Mount Lemmon Survey	·	940 m	MPC · JPL
299398	2005 XV_{68}	—	December 6, 2005	Kitt Peak	Spacewatch	·	730 m	MPC · JPL
299399	2005 XN_{90}	—	December 8, 2005	Kitt Peak	Spacewatch	·	610 m	MPC · JPL
299400	2005 XR_{110}	—	December 1, 2005	Kitt Peak	M. W. Buie	·	2.3 km	MPC · JPL

== 299401–299500 ==
back to top

Designation			Discovery			Properties		Ref
Permanent	Provisional	Named after	Date	Site	Discoverer(s)	Category	Diam.	Ref
299401	2005 YH_{3}	—	December 22, 2005	Kitt Peak	Spacewatch	·	630 m	MPC · JPL
299402	2005 YJ_{3}	—	December 22, 2005	Kitt Peak	Spacewatch	·	800 m	MPC · JPL
299403	2005 YL_{15}	—	December 22, 2005	Kitt Peak	Spacewatch	·	1.5 km	MPC · JPL
299404	2005 YV_{15}	—	December 22, 2005	Kitt Peak	Spacewatch	ERI	2.6 km	MPC · JPL
299405	2005 YK_{23}	—	December 24, 2005	Kitt Peak	Spacewatch	V	680 m	MPC · JPL
299406	2005 YN_{34}	—	December 24, 2005	Kitt Peak	Spacewatch	·	660 m	MPC · JPL
299407	2005 YA_{36}	—	December 25, 2005	Kitt Peak	Spacewatch	·	1.5 km	MPC · JPL
299408	2005 YC_{47}	—	December 25, 2005	Kitt Peak	Spacewatch	·	870 m	MPC · JPL
299409	2005 YO_{52}	—	December 26, 2005	Mount Lemmon	Mount Lemmon Survey	·	740 m	MPC · JPL
299410	2005 YZ_{53}	—	December 24, 2005	Kitt Peak	Spacewatch	·	830 m	MPC · JPL
299411	2005 YN_{58}	—	December 24, 2005	Kitt Peak	Spacewatch	3:2	4.8 km	MPC · JPL
299412	2005 YO_{59}	—	December 26, 2005	Mount Lemmon	Mount Lemmon Survey	·	2.4 km	MPC · JPL
299413	2005 YD_{84}	—	December 24, 2005	Kitt Peak	Spacewatch	·	960 m	MPC · JPL
299414	2005 YG_{84}	—	December 24, 2005	Kitt Peak	Spacewatch	·	900 m	MPC · JPL
299415	2005 YC_{88}	—	December 25, 2005	Mount Lemmon	Mount Lemmon Survey	·	850 m	MPC · JPL
299416	2005 YW_{90}	—	December 26, 2005	Mount Lemmon	Mount Lemmon Survey	NYS	1.1 km	MPC · JPL
299417	2005 YG_{91}	—	December 26, 2005	Mount Lemmon	Mount Lemmon Survey	·	820 m	MPC · JPL
299418	2005 YE_{93}	—	December 27, 2005	Kitt Peak	Spacewatch	·	1.4 km	MPC · JPL
299419	2005 YS_{102}	—	December 25, 2005	Kitt Peak	Spacewatch	·	890 m	MPC · JPL
299420	2005 YW_{105}	—	December 25, 2005	Kitt Peak	Spacewatch	·	940 m	MPC · JPL
299421	2005 YM_{109}	—	December 25, 2005	Kitt Peak	Spacewatch	3:2	4.8 km	MPC · JPL
299422	2005 YL_{161}	—	April 8, 2003	Kitt Peak	Spacewatch	·	790 m	MPC · JPL
299423	2005 YE_{170}	—	December 31, 2005	Kitt Peak	Spacewatch	·	960 m	MPC · JPL
299424	2005 YQ_{176}	—	December 22, 2005	Kitt Peak	Spacewatch	NYS	1.4 km	MPC · JPL
299425	2005 YT_{177}	—	December 26, 2005	Kitt Peak	Spacewatch	3:2	5.1 km	MPC · JPL
299426	2005 YX_{250}	—	December 28, 2005	Kitt Peak	Spacewatch	·	920 m	MPC · JPL
299427	2005 YN_{271}	—	December 28, 2005	Kitt Peak	Spacewatch	·	760 m	MPC · JPL
299428	2005 YO_{290}	—	December 25, 2005	Mount Lemmon	Mount Lemmon Survey	·	790 m	MPC · JPL
299429	2006 AO_{6}	—	January 5, 2006	Catalina	CSS	·	890 m	MPC · JPL
299430	2006 AL_{14}	—	January 5, 2006	Mount Lemmon	Mount Lemmon Survey	NYS	1.3 km	MPC · JPL
299431	2006 AQ_{20}	—	January 5, 2006	Catalina	CSS	·	720 m	MPC · JPL
299432	2006 AC_{37}	—	January 4, 2006	Kitt Peak	Spacewatch	·	1.4 km	MPC · JPL
299433	2006 AS_{39}	—	January 7, 2006	Mount Lemmon	Mount Lemmon Survey	·	550 m	MPC · JPL
299434	2006 AT_{46}	—	January 6, 2006	Kitt Peak	Spacewatch	3:2 · SHU	6.0 km	MPC · JPL
299435	2006 AL_{53}	—	January 5, 2006	Kitt Peak	Spacewatch	·	1.0 km	MPC · JPL
299436	2006 AF_{54}	—	January 5, 2006	Kitt Peak	Spacewatch	·	900 m	MPC · JPL
299437	2006 AY_{57}	—	January 8, 2006	Mount Lemmon	Mount Lemmon Survey	·	760 m	MPC · JPL
299438	2006 AN_{59}	—	January 4, 2006	Kitt Peak	Spacewatch	·	520 m	MPC · JPL
299439	2006 AW_{62}	—	January 6, 2006	Kitt Peak	Spacewatch	·	480 m	MPC · JPL
299440	2006 AJ_{78}	—	January 8, 2006	Mount Lemmon	Mount Lemmon Survey	PHO	1.3 km	MPC · JPL
299441	2006 AQ_{78}	—	January 4, 2006	Kitt Peak	Spacewatch	·	1.5 km	MPC · JPL
299442	2006 BZ_{6}	—	January 20, 2006	Kitt Peak	Spacewatch	NYS	1.0 km	MPC · JPL
299443	2006 BK_{10}	—	January 20, 2006	Kitt Peak	Spacewatch	3:2	5.3 km	MPC · JPL
299444	2006 BB_{11}	—	January 20, 2006	Kitt Peak	Spacewatch	3:2 · SHU	7.1 km	MPC · JPL
299445	2006 BA_{18}	—	January 22, 2006	Anderson Mesa	LONEOS	·	970 m	MPC · JPL
299446	2006 BG_{37}	—	January 23, 2006	Mount Lemmon	Mount Lemmon Survey	·	1.3 km	MPC · JPL
299447	2006 BY_{41}	—	January 22, 2006	Mount Lemmon	Mount Lemmon Survey	L5	10 km	MPC · JPL
299448	2006 BE_{45}	—	January 23, 2006	Mount Lemmon	Mount Lemmon Survey	·	1.4 km	MPC · JPL
299449	2006 BN_{45}	—	January 23, 2006	Mount Lemmon	Mount Lemmon Survey	·	1.1 km	MPC · JPL
299450	2006 BT_{46}	—	January 23, 2006	Mount Lemmon	Mount Lemmon Survey	·	1.8 km	MPC · JPL
299451	2006 BC_{47}	—	January 24, 2006	Socorro	LINEAR	(2076)	1.1 km	MPC · JPL
299452	2006 BZ_{51}	—	January 25, 2006	Kitt Peak	Spacewatch	·	740 m	MPC · JPL
299453	2006 BS_{55}	—	January 22, 2006	Wrightwood	J. W. Young	·	850 m	MPC · JPL
299454	2006 BG_{56}	—	January 20, 2006	Kitt Peak	Spacewatch	·	1.3 km	MPC · JPL
299455	2006 BA_{60}	—	January 25, 2006	Kitt Peak	Spacewatch	·	780 m	MPC · JPL
299456	2006 BT_{62}	—	January 20, 2006	Kitt Peak	Spacewatch	·	1.5 km	MPC · JPL
299457	2006 BE_{70}	—	January 23, 2006	Kitt Peak	Spacewatch	·	830 m	MPC · JPL
299458	2006 BK_{71}	—	January 23, 2006	Kitt Peak	Spacewatch	·	1.3 km	MPC · JPL
299459	2006 BX_{80}	—	January 23, 2006	Kitt Peak	Spacewatch	NYS	1.4 km	MPC · JPL
299460	2006 BQ_{81}	—	January 23, 2006	Kitt Peak	Spacewatch	NYS ·	2.7 km	MPC · JPL
299461	2006 BZ_{87}	—	January 25, 2006	Kitt Peak	Spacewatch	MAS	820 m	MPC · JPL
299462	2006 BC_{94}	—	January 26, 2006	Kitt Peak	Spacewatch	·	1.1 km	MPC · JPL
299463	2006 BD_{94}	—	January 26, 2006	Kitt Peak	Spacewatch	·	1.2 km	MPC · JPL
299464	2006 BS_{102}	—	January 23, 2006	Mount Lemmon	Mount Lemmon Survey	·	1.3 km	MPC · JPL
299465	2006 BL_{103}	—	January 23, 2006	Junk Bond	D. Healy	L5	8.6 km	MPC · JPL
299466	2006 BG_{106}	—	January 25, 2006	Kitt Peak	Spacewatch	·	800 m	MPC · JPL
299467	2006 BD_{115}	—	January 26, 2006	Kitt Peak	Spacewatch	NYS	1.6 km	MPC · JPL
299468	2006 BH_{115}	—	January 26, 2006	Kitt Peak	Spacewatch	V	690 m	MPC · JPL
299469	2006 BO_{115}	—	January 26, 2006	Kitt Peak	Spacewatch	·	1.2 km	MPC · JPL
299470	2006 BM_{119}	—	January 26, 2006	Kitt Peak	Spacewatch	NYS	1.3 km	MPC · JPL
299471	2006 BZ_{119}	—	January 26, 2006	Kitt Peak	Spacewatch	·	1.0 km	MPC · JPL
299472	2006 BF_{132}	—	January 26, 2006	Kitt Peak	Spacewatch	V	880 m	MPC · JPL
299473	2006 BO_{132}	—	January 26, 2006	Kitt Peak	Spacewatch	L5	8.6 km	MPC · JPL
299474	2006 BY_{136}	—	January 28, 2006	Mount Lemmon	Mount Lemmon Survey	·	2.1 km	MPC · JPL
299475	2006 BQ_{140}	—	January 22, 2006	Mount Lemmon	Mount Lemmon Survey	·	1.0 km	MPC · JPL
299476	2006 BP_{143}	—	January 28, 2006	Mount Lemmon	Mount Lemmon Survey	·	1.6 km	MPC · JPL
299477	2006 BU_{147}	—	January 31, 2006	7300	W. K. Y. Yeung	·	890 m	MPC · JPL
299478	2006 BC_{148}	—	January 31, 2006	7300	W. K. Y. Yeung	·	690 m	MPC · JPL
299479	2006 BX_{160}	—	January 26, 2006	Kitt Peak	Spacewatch	L5	8.2 km	MPC · JPL
299480	2006 BB_{165}	—	January 26, 2006	Kitt Peak	Spacewatch	·	860 m	MPC · JPL
299481	2006 BZ_{170}	—	January 27, 2006	Kitt Peak	Spacewatch	·	950 m	MPC · JPL
299482	2006 BX_{171}	—	January 27, 2006	Kitt Peak	Spacewatch	NYS	1.3 km	MPC · JPL
299483	2006 BP_{182}	—	January 27, 2006	Mount Lemmon	Mount Lemmon Survey	·	1.1 km	MPC · JPL
299484	2006 BX_{182}	—	January 27, 2006	Mount Lemmon	Mount Lemmon Survey	T_{j} (2.95) · 3:2	7.6 km	MPC · JPL
299485	2006 BM_{184}	—	January 28, 2006	Mount Lemmon	Mount Lemmon Survey	·	920 m	MPC · JPL
299486	2006 BP_{185}	—	August 30, 2000	Kitt Peak	Spacewatch	·	1.0 km	MPC · JPL
299487	2006 BU_{188}	—	January 28, 2006	Kitt Peak	Spacewatch	·	1.8 km	MPC · JPL
299488	2006 BD_{192}	—	January 30, 2006	Catalina	CSS	·	1.8 km	MPC · JPL
299489	2006 BD_{194}	—	January 30, 2006	Kitt Peak	Spacewatch	·	1.2 km	MPC · JPL
299490	2006 BR_{195}	—	January 30, 2006	Kitt Peak	Spacewatch	·	1.1 km	MPC · JPL
299491	2006 BY_{198}	—	January 30, 2006	Catalina	CSS	L5	15 km	MPC · JPL
299492	2006 BQ_{201}	—	January 31, 2006	Kitt Peak	Spacewatch	·	1.5 km	MPC · JPL
299493	2006 BA_{202}	—	January 31, 2006	Kitt Peak	Spacewatch	NYS	1.4 km	MPC · JPL
299494	2006 BJ_{212}	—	January 31, 2006	Kitt Peak	Spacewatch	·	840 m	MPC · JPL
299495	2006 BC_{224}	—	January 30, 2006	Kitt Peak	Spacewatch	V	950 m	MPC · JPL
299496	2006 BY_{226}	—	January 30, 2006	Kitt Peak	Spacewatch	·	800 m	MPC · JPL
299497	2006 BF_{227}	—	January 30, 2006	Kitt Peak	Spacewatch	·	880 m	MPC · JPL
299498	2006 BH_{227}	—	January 30, 2006	Kitt Peak	Spacewatch	·	560 m	MPC · JPL
299499	2006 BV_{227}	—	January 30, 2006	Kitt Peak	Spacewatch	MAS	850 m	MPC · JPL
299500	2006 BX_{232}	—	January 31, 2006	Kitt Peak	Spacewatch	·	790 m	MPC · JPL

== 299501–299600 ==
back to top

Designation			Discovery			Properties		Ref
Permanent	Provisional	Named after	Date	Site	Discoverer(s)	Category	Diam.	Ref
299501	2006 BA_{237}	—	January 31, 2006	Kitt Peak	Spacewatch	·	1.4 km	MPC · JPL
299502	2006 BO_{242}	—	January 31, 2006	Kitt Peak	Spacewatch	MAS	1.1 km	MPC · JPL
299503	2006 BV_{245}	—	January 31, 2006	Kitt Peak	Spacewatch	·	1.4 km	MPC · JPL
299504	2006 BC_{264}	—	January 31, 2006	Kitt Peak	Spacewatch	MAS	740 m	MPC · JPL
299505	2006 BB_{269}	—	January 27, 2006	Catalina	CSS	·	1.7 km	MPC · JPL
299506	2006 CH_{3}	—	February 1, 2006	Mount Lemmon	Mount Lemmon Survey	·	1.3 km	MPC · JPL
299507	2006 CN_{5}	—	February 1, 2006	Mount Lemmon	Mount Lemmon Survey	·	1.1 km	MPC · JPL
299508	2006 CK_{6}	—	February 1, 2006	Mount Lemmon	Mount Lemmon Survey	NYS	1.2 km	MPC · JPL
299509	2006 CJ_{10}	—	February 7, 2006	Wrightwood	J. W. Young	·	1.2 km	MPC · JPL
299510	2006 CV_{12}	—	February 1, 2006	Kitt Peak	Spacewatch	V	960 m	MPC · JPL
299511	2006 CQ_{17}	—	February 1, 2006	Kitt Peak	Spacewatch	L5	15 km	MPC · JPL
299512	2006 CA_{21}	—	February 1, 2006	Mount Lemmon	Mount Lemmon Survey	V	630 m	MPC · JPL
299513	2006 CY_{25}	—	February 2, 2006	Kitt Peak	Spacewatch	·	1.2 km	MPC · JPL
299514	2006 CT_{27}	—	February 2, 2006	Kitt Peak	Spacewatch	·	650 m	MPC · JPL
299515	2006 CD_{46}	—	February 3, 2006	Kitt Peak	Spacewatch	·	1.1 km	MPC · JPL
299516	2006 CW_{49}	—	February 3, 2006	Socorro	LINEAR	·	980 m	MPC · JPL
299517	2006 CO_{57}	—	February 4, 2006	Mount Lemmon	Mount Lemmon Survey	·	1.8 km	MPC · JPL
299518 Metchev	2006 CX_{63}	Metchev	February 2, 2006	Mauna Kea	P. A. Wiegert	·	820 m	MPC · JPL
299519	2006 CQ_{66}	—	February 3, 2006	Kitt Peak	Spacewatch	MAS	820 m	MPC · JPL
299520	2006 CA_{68}	—	February 6, 2006	Mount Lemmon	Mount Lemmon Survey	MAS	870 m	MPC · JPL
299521	2006 DL_{1}	—	February 20, 2006	Kitt Peak	Spacewatch	·	1.0 km	MPC · JPL
299522	2006 DY_{1}	—	February 20, 2006	Kitt Peak	Spacewatch	·	1.8 km	MPC · JPL
299523	2006 DF_{2}	—	February 20, 2006	Kitt Peak	Spacewatch	L5	12 km	MPC · JPL
299524	2006 DW_{4}	—	February 20, 2006	Kitt Peak	Spacewatch	L5	9.3 km	MPC · JPL
299525	2006 DQ_{15}	—	February 20, 2006	Kitt Peak	Spacewatch	NYS	1.4 km	MPC · JPL
299526	2006 DD_{17}	—	February 20, 2006	Kitt Peak	Spacewatch	·	1.2 km	MPC · JPL
299527	2006 DZ_{20}	—	February 20, 2006	Catalina	CSS	·	1.7 km	MPC · JPL
299528	2006 DF_{21}	—	February 20, 2006	Mount Lemmon	Mount Lemmon Survey	·	780 m	MPC · JPL
299529	2006 DS_{21}	—	February 20, 2006	Kitt Peak	Spacewatch	(2076)	970 m	MPC · JPL
299530	2006 DB_{26}	—	February 20, 2006	Socorro	LINEAR	PHO	2.4 km	MPC · JPL
299531	2006 DF_{31}	—	February 20, 2006	Mount Lemmon	Mount Lemmon Survey	·	1.7 km	MPC · JPL
299532	2006 DS_{31}	—	February 20, 2006	Mount Lemmon	Mount Lemmon Survey	·	1.3 km	MPC · JPL
299533	2006 DD_{32}	—	February 20, 2006	Mount Lemmon	Mount Lemmon Survey	·	1.1 km	MPC · JPL
299534	2006 DV_{33}	—	February 20, 2006	Kitt Peak	Spacewatch	·	1.6 km	MPC · JPL
299535	2006 DC_{41}	—	February 22, 2006	Palomar	NEAT	PHO	1.3 km	MPC · JPL
299536	2006 DO_{47}	—	February 21, 2006	Mount Lemmon	Mount Lemmon Survey	·	990 m	MPC · JPL
299537	2006 DC_{50}	—	February 22, 2006	Catalina	CSS	L5	10 km	MPC · JPL
299538	2006 DN_{50}	—	February 22, 2006	Catalina	CSS	PHO	1.8 km	MPC · JPL
299539	2006 DD_{54}	—	February 24, 2006	Kitt Peak	Spacewatch	·	1.4 km	MPC · JPL
299540	2006 DK_{58}	—	February 24, 2006	Mount Lemmon	Mount Lemmon Survey	·	1.0 km	MPC · JPL
299541	2006 DP_{63}	—	February 24, 2006	Kitt Peak	Spacewatch	MAS	860 m	MPC · JPL
299542	2006 DC_{79}	—	February 24, 2006	Kitt Peak	Spacewatch	NYS	1.3 km	MPC · JPL
299543	2006 DE_{80}	—	February 24, 2006	Kitt Peak	Spacewatch	·	2.6 km	MPC · JPL
299544	2006 DL_{80}	—	February 24, 2006	Kitt Peak	Spacewatch	·	1.4 km	MPC · JPL
299545	2006 DZ_{84}	—	February 24, 2006	Kitt Peak	Spacewatch	·	1.4 km	MPC · JPL
299546	2006 DD_{96}	—	February 24, 2006	Kitt Peak	Spacewatch	·	740 m	MPC · JPL
299547	2006 DQ_{99}	—	February 25, 2006	Kitt Peak	Spacewatch	L5	10 km	MPC · JPL
299548	2006 DS_{118}	—	February 28, 2006	Mount Lemmon	Mount Lemmon Survey	V	800 m	MPC · JPL
299549	2006 DT_{118}	—	February 28, 2006	Socorro	LINEAR	·	1.6 km	MPC · JPL
299550	2006 DN_{120}	—	February 21, 2006	Catalina	CSS	·	1.1 km	MPC · JPL
299551	2006 DH_{127}	—	February 25, 2006	Kitt Peak	Spacewatch	L5	9.5 km	MPC · JPL
299552	2006 DN_{127}	—	February 25, 2006	Mount Lemmon	Mount Lemmon Survey	L5	8.5 km	MPC · JPL
299553	2006 DP_{132}	—	February 25, 2006	Kitt Peak	Spacewatch	NYS	1.4 km	MPC · JPL
299554	2006 DG_{138}	—	February 25, 2006	Kitt Peak	Spacewatch	·	1.2 km	MPC · JPL
299555	2006 DX_{141}	—	February 25, 2006	Kitt Peak	Spacewatch	·	840 m	MPC · JPL
299556	2006 DD_{146}	—	February 25, 2006	Mount Lemmon	Mount Lemmon Survey	NYS	1.2 km	MPC · JPL
299557	2006 DS_{148}	—	February 25, 2006	Kitt Peak	Spacewatch	·	1.1 km	MPC · JPL
299558	2006 DY_{151}	—	February 25, 2006	Kitt Peak	Spacewatch	·	1.6 km	MPC · JPL
299559	2006 DB_{156}	—	February 27, 2006	Kitt Peak	Spacewatch	NYS	1.4 km	MPC · JPL
299560	2006 DQ_{156}	—	February 27, 2006	Kitt Peak	Spacewatch	·	1.6 km	MPC · JPL
299561	2006 DY_{171}	—	February 27, 2006	Kitt Peak	Spacewatch	NYS	1.3 km	MPC · JPL
299562	2006 DQ_{175}	—	February 27, 2006	Mount Lemmon	Mount Lemmon Survey	·	1.2 km	MPC · JPL
299563	2006 DS_{190}	—	February 27, 2006	Kitt Peak	Spacewatch	·	1.1 km	MPC · JPL
299564	2006 DX_{192}	—	February 27, 2006	Kitt Peak	Spacewatch	·	1.3 km	MPC · JPL
299565	2006 DD_{193}	—	February 27, 2006	Kitt Peak	Spacewatch	·	2.0 km	MPC · JPL
299566	2006 DG_{193}	—	February 27, 2006	Kitt Peak	Spacewatch	·	2.2 km	MPC · JPL
299567	2006 DU_{203}	—	February 23, 2006	Anderson Mesa	LONEOS	V	950 m	MPC · JPL
299568	2006 DG_{208}	—	February 25, 2006	Kitt Peak	Spacewatch	·	1.3 km	MPC · JPL
299569	2006 DM_{211}	—	February 24, 2006	Kitt Peak	Spacewatch	·	1.4 km	MPC · JPL
299570	2006 DV_{214}	—	February 25, 2006	Mount Lemmon	Mount Lemmon Survey	·	870 m	MPC · JPL
299571	2006 ES_{1}	—	March 3, 2006	Mount Nyukasa	Japan Aerospace Exploration Agency	·	830 m	MPC · JPL
299572	2006 EZ_{30}	—	March 3, 2006	Kitt Peak	Spacewatch	L5	20 km	MPC · JPL
299573	2006 ED_{40}	—	March 4, 2006	Kitt Peak	Spacewatch	·	1.4 km	MPC · JPL
299574	2006 EY_{45}	—	March 3, 2006	Kitt Peak	Spacewatch	·	1.3 km	MPC · JPL
299575	2006 EE_{58}	—	March 5, 2006	Kitt Peak	Spacewatch	L5	10 km	MPC · JPL
299576	2006 EO_{63}	—	March 5, 2006	Kitt Peak	Spacewatch	V	740 m	MPC · JPL
299577	2006 FK_{8}	—	March 23, 2006	Mount Lemmon	Mount Lemmon Survey	·	1.2 km	MPC · JPL
299578	2006 FX_{30}	—	March 25, 2006	Mount Lemmon	Mount Lemmon Survey	·	1.7 km	MPC · JPL
299579	2006 FD_{39}	—	March 23, 2006	Kitt Peak	Spacewatch	·	1.8 km	MPC · JPL
299580	2006 FO_{40}	—	March 26, 2006	Kitt Peak	Spacewatch	·	1.2 km	MPC · JPL
299581	2006 FU_{42}	—	March 26, 2006	Mount Lemmon	Mount Lemmon Survey	·	1.2 km	MPC · JPL
299582	2006 GQ_{2}	—	April 6, 2006	Catalina	CSS	APO +1km	620 m	MPC · JPL
299583	2006 GK_{11}	—	April 2, 2006	Kitt Peak	Spacewatch	·	1.3 km	MPC · JPL
299584	2006 GY_{12}	—	April 2, 2006	Kitt Peak	Spacewatch	·	1.1 km	MPC · JPL
299585	2006 GA_{14}	—	April 2, 2006	Kitt Peak	Spacewatch	V	810 m	MPC · JPL
299586	2006 GW_{18}	—	April 2, 2006	Kitt Peak	Spacewatch	V	770 m	MPC · JPL
299587	2006 GT_{19}	—	April 2, 2006	Kitt Peak	Spacewatch	·	990 m	MPC · JPL
299588	2006 GJ_{25}	—	April 2, 2006	Kitt Peak	Spacewatch	·	1.1 km	MPC · JPL
299589	2006 GD_{41}	—	April 7, 2006	Catalina	CSS	·	1.7 km	MPC · JPL
299590	2006 HA_{11}	—	April 19, 2006	Kitt Peak	Spacewatch	·	1.9 km	MPC · JPL
299591	2006 HC_{13}	—	April 19, 2006	Kitt Peak	Spacewatch	·	1.6 km	MPC · JPL
299592	2006 HT_{28}	—	April 21, 2006	Kitt Peak	Spacewatch	·	1.5 km	MPC · JPL
299593	2006 HX_{29}	—	April 19, 2006	Anderson Mesa	LONEOS	PHO	1.4 km	MPC · JPL
299594	2006 HL_{34}	—	April 19, 2006	Mount Lemmon	Mount Lemmon Survey	·	930 m	MPC · JPL
299595	2006 HF_{35}	—	April 19, 2006	Mount Lemmon	Mount Lemmon Survey	·	1.6 km	MPC · JPL
299596	2006 HR_{36}	—	April 20, 2006	Kitt Peak	Spacewatch	·	3.1 km	MPC · JPL
299597	2006 HH_{42}	—	April 21, 2006	Siding Spring	SSS	·	2.2 km	MPC · JPL
299598	2006 HB_{45}	—	April 25, 2006	Kitt Peak	Spacewatch	MAS	860 m	MPC · JPL
299599	2006 HO_{50}	—	April 26, 2006	Mount Lemmon	Mount Lemmon Survey	·	1.8 km	MPC · JPL
299600	2006 HM_{67}	—	April 24, 2006	Kitt Peak	Spacewatch	·	1.7 km	MPC · JPL

== 299601–299700 ==
back to top

Designation			Discovery			Properties		Ref
Permanent	Provisional	Named after	Date	Site	Discoverer(s)	Category	Diam.	Ref
299601	2006 HL_{69}	—	April 24, 2006	Mount Lemmon	Mount Lemmon Survey	·	1.8 km	MPC · JPL
299602	2006 HC_{71}	—	April 25, 2006	Kitt Peak	Spacewatch	fast	2.0 km	MPC · JPL
299603	2006 HR_{73}	—	April 25, 2006	Kitt Peak	Spacewatch	EUN	1.1 km	MPC · JPL
299604	2006 HL_{74}	—	April 25, 2006	Kitt Peak	Spacewatch	V	980 m	MPC · JPL
299605	2006 HO_{76}	—	April 25, 2006	Kitt Peak	Spacewatch	·	2.6 km	MPC · JPL
299606	2006 HS_{77}	—	April 26, 2006	Kitt Peak	Spacewatch	·	1.2 km	MPC · JPL
299607	2006 HQ_{81}	—	April 26, 2006	Kitt Peak	Spacewatch	·	980 m	MPC · JPL
299608	2006 HL_{83}	—	April 26, 2006	Kitt Peak	Spacewatch	·	1.4 km	MPC · JPL
299609	2006 HJ_{87}	—	April 30, 2006	Kitt Peak	Spacewatch	·	980 m	MPC · JPL
299610	2006 HP_{88}	—	April 30, 2006	Catalina	CSS	·	1.9 km	MPC · JPL
299611	2006 HZ_{89}	—	April 26, 2006	Anderson Mesa	LONEOS	·	3.1 km	MPC · JPL
299612	2006 HE_{92}	—	April 29, 2006	Kitt Peak	Spacewatch	·	1.7 km	MPC · JPL
299613	2006 HY_{93}	—	April 29, 2006	Kitt Peak	Spacewatch	·	2.0 km	MPC · JPL
299614	2006 HB_{98}	—	April 30, 2006	Kitt Peak	Spacewatch	·	1.1 km	MPC · JPL
299615	2006 HE_{110}	—	April 24, 2006	Siding Spring	SSS	·	5.5 km	MPC · JPL
299616	2006 JE_{4}	—	May 2, 2006	Mount Lemmon	Mount Lemmon Survey	·	2.3 km	MPC · JPL
299617	2006 JX_{6}	—	May 1, 2006	Kitt Peak	Spacewatch	·	1.1 km	MPC · JPL
299618	2006 JR_{12}	—	May 1, 2006	Kitt Peak	Spacewatch	·	1.6 km	MPC · JPL
299619	2006 JG_{17}	—	May 2, 2006	Kitt Peak	Spacewatch	·	1.2 km	MPC · JPL
299620	2006 JS_{25}	—	May 5, 2006	Mount Lemmon	Mount Lemmon Survey	MAS	880 m	MPC · JPL
299621	2006 JW_{31}	—	May 3, 2006	Kitt Peak	Spacewatch	·	1.3 km	MPC · JPL
299622	2006 JS_{32}	—	May 3, 2006	Kitt Peak	Spacewatch	·	2.0 km	MPC · JPL
299623	2006 JH_{34}	—	May 4, 2006	Kitt Peak	Spacewatch	·	1.5 km	MPC · JPL
299624	2006 JS_{35}	—	May 4, 2006	Kitt Peak	Spacewatch	·	1.2 km	MPC · JPL
299625	2006 JT_{43}	—	May 5, 2006	Kitt Peak	Spacewatch	(5)	1.5 km	MPC · JPL
299626	2006 JH_{50}	—	May 2, 2006	Mount Lemmon	Mount Lemmon Survey	·	1.8 km	MPC · JPL
299627	2006 JK_{54}	—	May 8, 2006	Mount Lemmon	Mount Lemmon Survey	·	1.6 km	MPC · JPL
299628	2006 JB_{56}	—	May 1, 2006	Catalina	CSS	EUN	1.5 km	MPC · JPL
299629	2006 JD_{61}	—	May 2, 2006	Kitt Peak	M. W. Buie	·	1.3 km	MPC · JPL
299630	2006 JF_{68}	—	May 1, 2006	Kitt Peak	M. W. Buie	·	1.7 km	MPC · JPL
299631 Kayliegreen	2006 JP_{68}	Kayliegreen	May 1, 2006	Mauna Kea	P. A. Wiegert	V	770 m	MPC · JPL
299632	2006 KU_{2}	—	May 18, 2006	Palomar	NEAT	·	1.5 km	MPC · JPL
299633	2006 KK_{3}	—	May 19, 2006	Mount Lemmon	Mount Lemmon Survey	·	1.1 km	MPC · JPL
299634	2006 KC_{8}	—	May 19, 2006	Mount Lemmon	Mount Lemmon Survey	·	2.3 km	MPC · JPL
299635	2006 KH_{16}	—	May 20, 2006	Palomar	NEAT	·	2.0 km	MPC · JPL
299636	2006 KR_{18}	—	May 21, 2006	Kitt Peak	Spacewatch	·	1.4 km	MPC · JPL
299637	2006 KX_{28}	—	May 20, 2006	Kitt Peak	Spacewatch	·	1.3 km	MPC · JPL
299638	2006 KC_{30}	—	May 20, 2006	Catalina	CSS	·	1.5 km	MPC · JPL
299639	2006 KW_{35}	—	May 20, 2006	Kitt Peak	Spacewatch	·	2.4 km	MPC · JPL
299640	2006 KW_{36}	—	May 21, 2006	Mount Lemmon	Mount Lemmon Survey	NYS	1.7 km	MPC · JPL
299641	2006 KR_{52}	—	May 21, 2006	Kitt Peak	Spacewatch	·	3.2 km	MPC · JPL
299642	2006 KP_{60}	—	May 22, 2006	Kitt Peak	Spacewatch	·	2.3 km	MPC · JPL
299643	2006 KE_{61}	—	May 22, 2006	Kitt Peak	Spacewatch	·	2.3 km	MPC · JPL
299644	2006 KG_{65}	—	May 24, 2006	Kitt Peak	Spacewatch	·	2.3 km	MPC · JPL
299645	2006 KO_{73}	—	May 23, 2006	Kitt Peak	Spacewatch	·	2.2 km	MPC · JPL
299646	2006 KG_{84}	—	May 22, 2006	Kitt Peak	Spacewatch	·	2.3 km	MPC · JPL
299647	2006 KR_{84}	—	May 24, 2006	Mount Lemmon	Mount Lemmon Survey	·	850 m	MPC · JPL
299648	2006 KC_{89}	—	May 27, 2006	Needville	J. Dellinger	·	1.9 km	MPC · JPL
299649	2006 KT_{93}	—	May 25, 2006	Kitt Peak	Spacewatch	·	1.9 km	MPC · JPL
299650	2006 KG_{97}	—	May 25, 2006	Kitt Peak	Spacewatch	·	2.7 km	MPC · JPL
299651	2006 KO_{103}	—	May 29, 2006	Reedy Creek	J. Broughton	·	2.3 km	MPC · JPL
299652	2006 KE_{116}	—	May 29, 2006	Kitt Peak	Spacewatch	·	2.1 km	MPC · JPL
299653	2006 KG_{121}	—	May 23, 2006	Siding Spring	SSS	EUN	1.5 km	MPC · JPL
299654	2006 LV_{1}	—	June 4, 2006	Kitt Peak	Spacewatch	·	3.1 km	MPC · JPL
299655	2006 MG	—	June 16, 2006	Kitt Peak	Spacewatch	·	1.8 km	MPC · JPL
299656	2006 MP_{3}	—	June 16, 2006	Palomar	NEAT	·	1.5 km	MPC · JPL
299657	2006 ME_{7}	—	June 18, 2006	Kitt Peak	Spacewatch	·	2.4 km	MPC · JPL
299658	2006 OV	—	July 18, 2006	Bergisch Gladbach	W. Bickel	·	2.3 km	MPC · JPL
299659	2006 OR_{18}	—	July 20, 2006	Siding Spring	SSS	EUN	1.8 km	MPC · JPL
299660	2006 OK_{20}	—	July 31, 2006	Siding Spring	SSS	DOR	2.4 km	MPC · JPL
299661	2006 OX_{20}	—	July 25, 2006	Mount Lemmon	Mount Lemmon Survey	AGN	1.8 km	MPC · JPL
299662	2006 OE_{21}	—	July 22, 2006	Mount Lemmon	Mount Lemmon Survey	KOR	1.6 km	MPC · JPL
299663	2006 OO_{21}	—	July 29, 2006	Siding Spring	SSS	BRA	2.0 km	MPC · JPL
299664	2006 PS_{4}	—	August 15, 2006	Reedy Creek	J. Broughton	DOR	4.2 km	MPC · JPL
299665	2006 PE_{7}	—	August 12, 2006	Palomar	NEAT	·	3.2 km	MPC · JPL
299666	2006 PY_{11}	—	August 13, 2006	Palomar	NEAT	HOF	3.1 km	MPC · JPL
299667	2006 PC_{40}	—	August 14, 2006	Palomar	NEAT	·	2.9 km	MPC · JPL
299668	2006 QV_{1}	—	August 17, 2006	Palomar	NEAT	·	2.3 km	MPC · JPL
299669	2006 QW_{6}	—	August 17, 2006	Palomar	NEAT	·	3.1 km	MPC · JPL
299670	2006 QU_{7}	—	August 19, 2006	Kitt Peak	Spacewatch	·	3.0 km	MPC · JPL
299671	2006 QQ_{13}	—	August 17, 2006	Palomar	NEAT	·	2.6 km	MPC · JPL
299672	2006 QG_{15}	—	August 17, 2006	Palomar	NEAT	·	2.7 km	MPC · JPL
299673	2006 QG_{16}	—	August 17, 2006	Palomar	NEAT	DOR	3.1 km	MPC · JPL
299674	2006 QM_{21}	—	August 19, 2006	Anderson Mesa	LONEOS	·	2.6 km	MPC · JPL
299675	2006 QT_{27}	—	August 20, 2006	Palomar	NEAT	·	4.1 km	MPC · JPL
299676	2006 QE_{32}	—	August 19, 2006	Palomar	NEAT	DOR	3.2 km	MPC · JPL
299677	2006 QQ_{42}	—	August 17, 2006	Palomar	NEAT	·	3.1 km	MPC · JPL
299678	2006 QG_{46}	—	August 20, 2006	Palomar	NEAT	DOR	3.6 km	MPC · JPL
299679	2006 QN_{61}	—	August 22, 2006	Palomar	NEAT	·	2.6 km	MPC · JPL
299680	2006 QB_{67}	—	August 21, 2006	Kitt Peak	Spacewatch	KOR	1.6 km	MPC · JPL
299681	2006 QN_{74}	—	August 21, 2006	Kitt Peak	Spacewatch	·	2.1 km	MPC · JPL
299682	2006 QQ_{79}	—	August 24, 2006	Socorro	LINEAR	·	2.7 km	MPC · JPL
299683	2006 QW_{81}	—	August 24, 2006	Palomar	NEAT	·	2.6 km	MPC · JPL
299684	2006 QB_{90}	—	August 27, 2006	Kitt Peak	Spacewatch	·	2.5 km	MPC · JPL
299685	2006 QQ_{93}	—	August 16, 2006	Palomar	NEAT	·	2.5 km	MPC · JPL
299686	2006 QP_{94}	—	August 16, 2006	Palomar	NEAT	·	2.1 km	MPC · JPL
299687	2006 QB_{96}	—	August 16, 2006	Palomar	NEAT	·	4.9 km	MPC · JPL
299688	2006 QN_{100}	—	August 24, 2006	Palomar	NEAT	·	1.9 km	MPC · JPL
299689	2006 QY_{100}	—	August 26, 2006	Socorro	LINEAR	TIR	4.8 km	MPC · JPL
299690	2006 QT_{104}	—	August 28, 2006	Kitt Peak	Spacewatch	HOF	3.0 km	MPC · JPL
299691	2006 QX_{106}	—	August 28, 2006	Catalina	CSS	·	2.2 km	MPC · JPL
299692	2006 QE_{107}	—	August 28, 2006	Anderson Mesa	LONEOS	·	2.7 km	MPC · JPL
299693	2006 QZ_{110}	—	August 30, 2006	Wrightwood	J. W. Young	·	4.8 km	MPC · JPL
299694	2006 QU_{120}	—	August 29, 2006	Catalina	CSS	GEF	1.6 km	MPC · JPL
299695	2006 QB_{137}	—	August 24, 2006	Socorro	LINEAR	MRX	1.4 km	MPC · JPL
299696	2006 QJ_{139}	—	August 17, 2006	Palomar	NEAT	·	2.9 km	MPC · JPL
299697	2006 QK_{139}	—	October 8, 2002	Anderson Mesa	LONEOS	·	2.7 km	MPC · JPL
299698	2006 QC_{145}	—	August 18, 2006	Kitt Peak	Spacewatch	·	2.3 km	MPC · JPL
299699	2006 QG_{148}	—	August 18, 2006	Kitt Peak	Spacewatch	·	2.7 km	MPC · JPL
299700	2006 QA_{149}	—	August 18, 2006	Kitt Peak	Spacewatch	·	2.9 km	MPC · JPL

== 299701–299800 ==
back to top

Designation			Discovery			Properties		Ref
Permanent	Provisional	Named after	Date	Site	Discoverer(s)	Category	Diam.	Ref
299701	2006 QW_{151}	—	August 19, 2006	Kitt Peak	Spacewatch	KOR	1.6 km	MPC · JPL
299702	2006 QG_{156}	—	August 19, 2006	Kitt Peak	Spacewatch	AGN	1.3 km	MPC · JPL
299703	2006 QH_{156}	—	August 19, 2006	Kitt Peak	Spacewatch	·	2.6 km	MPC · JPL
299704	2006 QS_{156}	—	August 19, 2006	Kitt Peak	Spacewatch	·	1.7 km	MPC · JPL
299705	2006 QS_{161}	—	August 19, 2006	Kitt Peak	Spacewatch	·	2.7 km	MPC · JPL
299706	2006 QW_{163}	—	August 27, 2006	Kitt Peak	Spacewatch	·	1.9 km	MPC · JPL
299707	2006 QF_{164}	—	August 29, 2006	Anderson Mesa	LONEOS	BRA	1.8 km	MPC · JPL
299708	2006 QB_{165}	—	August 29, 2006	Catalina	CSS	·	2.4 km	MPC · JPL
299709	2006 QH_{166}	—	August 29, 2006	Catalina	CSS	·	4.0 km	MPC · JPL
299710	2006 QT_{169}	—	August 28, 2006	Anderson Mesa	LONEOS	·	2.2 km	MPC · JPL
299711	2006 QS_{176}	—	August 18, 2006	Kitt Peak	Spacewatch	T_{j} (2.94)	3.4 km	MPC · JPL
299712	2006 QQ_{182}	—	August 18, 2006	Kitt Peak	Spacewatch	·	2.6 km	MPC · JPL
299713	2006 QO_{183}	—	August 29, 2006	Anderson Mesa	LONEOS	·	3.4 km	MPC · JPL
299714	2006 QQ_{184}	—	August 19, 2006	Kitt Peak	Spacewatch	KOR	1.5 km	MPC · JPL
299715	2006 QG_{187}	—	August 21, 2006	Kitt Peak	Spacewatch	·	3.1 km	MPC · JPL
299716	2006 RN_{6}	—	September 14, 2006	Catalina	CSS	·	3.3 km	MPC · JPL
299717	2006 RF_{7}	—	September 14, 2006	Kitt Peak	Spacewatch	EOS	2.3 km	MPC · JPL
299718	2006 RH_{15}	—	September 14, 2006	Catalina	CSS	·	2.5 km	MPC · JPL
299719	2006 RU_{15}	—	September 14, 2006	Catalina	CSS	EOS	2.5 km	MPC · JPL
299720	2006 RL_{19}	—	September 14, 2006	Palomar	NEAT	·	2.5 km	MPC · JPL
299721	2006 RH_{21}	—	September 15, 2006	Kitt Peak	Spacewatch	·	2.3 km	MPC · JPL
299722	2006 RP_{26}	—	September 14, 2006	Kitt Peak	Spacewatch	KOR · fast	1.5 km	MPC · JPL
299723	2006 RB_{27}	—	September 14, 2006	Catalina	CSS	·	2.3 km	MPC · JPL
299724	2006 RG_{33}	—	September 12, 2006	Catalina	CSS	KOR	1.7 km	MPC · JPL
299725	2006 RY_{33}	—	September 12, 2006	Catalina	CSS	·	2.7 km	MPC · JPL
299726	2006 RN_{38}	—	September 14, 2006	Catalina	CSS	·	2.3 km	MPC · JPL
299727	2006 RX_{41}	—	September 14, 2006	Kitt Peak	Spacewatch	KOR	1.3 km	MPC · JPL
299728	2006 RT_{48}	—	September 14, 2006	Kitt Peak	Spacewatch	·	5.1 km	MPC · JPL
299729	2006 RA_{49}	—	September 14, 2006	Kitt Peak	Spacewatch	·	3.5 km	MPC · JPL
299730	2006 RZ_{51}	—	September 14, 2006	Kitt Peak	Spacewatch	EOS	2.0 km	MPC · JPL
299731	2006 RC_{52}	—	September 14, 2006	Kitt Peak	Spacewatch	LIX	5.6 km	MPC · JPL
299732	2006 RN_{54}	—	September 14, 2006	Kitt Peak	Spacewatch	·	2.0 km	MPC · JPL
299733	2006 RE_{56}	—	September 14, 2006	Kitt Peak	Spacewatch	KOR	1.3 km	MPC · JPL
299734	2006 RJ_{58}	—	September 15, 2006	Kitt Peak	Spacewatch	·	2.0 km	MPC · JPL
299735	2006 RC_{59}	—	September 15, 2006	Kitt Peak	Spacewatch	·	2.6 km	MPC · JPL
299736	2006 RV_{63}	—	September 14, 2006	Catalina	CSS	·	4.3 km	MPC · JPL
299737	2006 RT_{68}	—	September 15, 2006	Kitt Peak	Spacewatch	·	2.5 km	MPC · JPL
299738	2006 RA_{70}	—	September 15, 2006	Kitt Peak	Spacewatch	EOS	1.7 km	MPC · JPL
299739	2006 RB_{71}	—	September 15, 2006	Kitt Peak	Spacewatch	·	1.6 km	MPC · JPL
299740	2006 RA_{73}	—	September 15, 2006	Kitt Peak	Spacewatch	KOR	1.3 km	MPC · JPL
299741	2006 RX_{75}	—	September 15, 2006	Kitt Peak	Spacewatch	·	1.9 km	MPC · JPL
299742	2006 RO_{79}	—	September 15, 2006	Kitt Peak	Spacewatch	KOR	1.5 km	MPC · JPL
299743	2006 RY_{80}	—	September 15, 2006	Kitt Peak	Spacewatch	·	3.5 km	MPC · JPL
299744	2006 RB_{83}	—	September 15, 2006	Kitt Peak	Spacewatch	·	1.9 km	MPC · JPL
299745	2006 RJ_{84}	—	September 15, 2006	Kitt Peak	Spacewatch	·	2.1 km	MPC · JPL
299746	2006 RS_{84}	—	September 15, 2006	Kitt Peak	Spacewatch	·	2.2 km	MPC · JPL
299747	2006 RY_{86}	—	September 15, 2006	Kitt Peak	Spacewatch	·	2.5 km	MPC · JPL
299748	2006 RP_{93}	—	September 15, 2006	Kitt Peak	Spacewatch	·	3.3 km	MPC · JPL
299749	2006 RB_{94}	—	September 15, 2006	Kitt Peak	Spacewatch	·	3.8 km	MPC · JPL
299750	2006 RU_{94}	—	September 15, 2006	Kitt Peak	Spacewatch	·	2.3 km	MPC · JPL
299751	2006 RX_{96}	—	September 15, 2006	Kitt Peak	Spacewatch	KOR	1.4 km	MPC · JPL
299752	2006 RM_{100}	—	September 14, 2006	Catalina	CSS	·	2.7 km	MPC · JPL
299753	2006 RR_{100}	—	September 14, 2006	Catalina	CSS	GEF	1.6 km	MPC · JPL
299754	2006 RX_{104}	—	September 14, 2006	Kitt Peak	Spacewatch	·	2.3 km	MPC · JPL
299755 Ericmontellese	2006 RB_{106}	Ericmontellese	September 14, 2006	Mauna Kea	Masiero, J.	·	2.0 km	MPC · JPL
299756 Kerryaileen	2006 RO_{109}	Kerryaileen	September 14, 2006	Mauna Kea	Masiero, J.	THM	2.3 km	MPC · JPL
299757	2006 RR_{120}	—	September 15, 2006	Kitt Peak	Spacewatch	·	2.2 km	MPC · JPL
299758	2006 RZ_{120}	—	September 15, 2006	Kitt Peak	Spacewatch	KOR	1.4 km	MPC · JPL
299759	2006 RE_{122}	—	September 15, 2006	Kitt Peak	Spacewatch	·	2.6 km	MPC · JPL
299760	2006 SS_{4}	—	September 16, 2006	Catalina	CSS	·	3.6 km	MPC · JPL
299761	2006 SM_{6}	—	September 16, 2006	Palomar	NEAT	HOF	3.6 km	MPC · JPL
299762	2006 SR_{8}	—	September 16, 2006	Catalina	CSS	·	7.7 km	MPC · JPL
299763	2006 SE_{12}	—	September 16, 2006	Catalina	CSS	·	3.3 km	MPC · JPL
299764	2006 SX_{13}	—	September 17, 2006	Kitt Peak	Spacewatch	·	2.5 km	MPC · JPL
299765	2006 SC_{15}	—	September 17, 2006	Catalina	CSS	·	4.6 km	MPC · JPL
299766	2006 SX_{20}	—	September 16, 2006	Anderson Mesa	LONEOS	·	2.5 km	MPC · JPL
299767	2006 SK_{21}	—	September 16, 2006	Anderson Mesa	LONEOS	·	2.3 km	MPC · JPL
299768	2006 SO_{24}	—	September 16, 2006	Catalina	CSS	EOS	3.1 km	MPC · JPL
299769	2006 SH_{30}	—	September 17, 2006	Kitt Peak	Spacewatch	·	2.0 km	MPC · JPL
299770	2006 SW_{31}	—	September 17, 2006	Kitt Peak	Spacewatch	·	1.9 km	MPC · JPL
299771	2006 SC_{32}	—	September 17, 2006	Kitt Peak	Spacewatch	EOS	3.4 km	MPC · JPL
299772	2006 SZ_{38}	—	September 18, 2006	Kitt Peak	Spacewatch	·	2.2 km	MPC · JPL
299773	2006 SD_{39}	—	September 18, 2006	Catalina	CSS	·	3.0 km	MPC · JPL
299774	2006 SF_{40}	—	September 18, 2006	Catalina	CSS	KOR	1.6 km	MPC · JPL
299775	2006 ST_{45}	—	September 18, 2006	Catalina	CSS	GEF	1.7 km	MPC · JPL
299776	2006 SK_{57}	—	September 18, 2006	Catalina	CSS	·	4.4 km	MPC · JPL
299777 Tanyastreeter	2006 SN_{63}	Tanyastreeter	September 21, 2006	Vallemare Borbona	V. S. Casulli	KOR	1.3 km	MPC · JPL
299778	2006 SO_{64}	—	September 19, 2006	Catalina	CSS	·	2.4 km	MPC · JPL
299779	2006 SN_{65}	—	September 18, 2006	Kitt Peak	Spacewatch	·	1.6 km	MPC · JPL
299780	2006 SK_{72}	—	September 19, 2006	Kitt Peak	Spacewatch	·	2.6 km	MPC · JPL
299781	2006 SE_{73}	—	September 19, 2006	Kitt Peak	Spacewatch	·	4.2 km	MPC · JPL
299782	2006 SG_{74}	—	September 19, 2006	Kitt Peak	Spacewatch	EOS	2.0 km	MPC · JPL
299783	2006 SV_{74}	—	September 19, 2006	Kitt Peak	Spacewatch	EOS	1.9 km	MPC · JPL
299784	2006 SD_{75}	—	September 19, 2006	Kitt Peak	Spacewatch	·	2.2 km	MPC · JPL
299785 Alexeymolchanov	2006 SC_{77}	Alexeymolchanov	September 22, 2006	Vallemare Borbona	V. S. Casulli	·	2.4 km	MPC · JPL
299786	2006 SU_{81}	—	September 18, 2006	Kitt Peak	Spacewatch	·	1.5 km	MPC · JPL
299787	2006 SE_{83}	—	September 18, 2006	Kitt Peak	Spacewatch	·	2.0 km	MPC · JPL
299788	2006 SZ_{83}	—	September 18, 2006	Kitt Peak	Spacewatch	EOS	2.0 km	MPC · JPL
299789	2006 SE_{87}	—	September 18, 2006	Kitt Peak	Spacewatch	·	2.7 km	MPC · JPL
299790	2006 SV_{89}	—	September 18, 2006	Kitt Peak	Spacewatch	·	3.0 km	MPC · JPL
299791	2006 SL_{93}	—	September 18, 2006	Kitt Peak	Spacewatch	THM	2.7 km	MPC · JPL
299792 Celeritas	2006 SY_{93}	Celeritas	September 18, 2006	Kitt Peak	Spacewatch	·	2.1 km	MPC · JPL
299793	2006 SR_{94}	—	September 18, 2006	Kitt Peak	Spacewatch	KOR	1.5 km	MPC · JPL
299794	2006 SC_{95}	—	September 18, 2006	Kitt Peak	Spacewatch	·	2.0 km	MPC · JPL
299795	2006 SE_{95}	—	September 18, 2006	Kitt Peak	Spacewatch	EOS	1.8 km	MPC · JPL
299796	2006 SY_{96}	—	September 18, 2006	Kitt Peak	Spacewatch	·	1.8 km	MPC · JPL
299797	2006 SA_{97}	—	September 18, 2006	Kitt Peak	Spacewatch	EOS	2.4 km	MPC · JPL
299798	2006 SD_{99}	—	September 18, 2006	Kitt Peak	Spacewatch	·	1.8 km	MPC · JPL
299799	2006 SA_{102}	—	September 20, 2001	Socorro	LINEAR	·	2.2 km	MPC · JPL
299800	2006 SP_{106}	—	September 19, 2006	Kitt Peak	Spacewatch	(8737)	3.6 km	MPC · JPL

== 299801–299900 ==
back to top

Designation			Discovery			Properties		Ref
Permanent	Provisional	Named after	Date	Site	Discoverer(s)	Category	Diam.	Ref
299801	2006 SD_{108}	—	September 19, 2006	Anderson Mesa	LONEOS	·	2.7 km	MPC · JPL
299802	2006 SV_{108}	—	September 19, 2006	Kitt Peak	Spacewatch	·	1.8 km	MPC · JPL
299803	2006 SF_{109}	—	September 19, 2006	Kitt Peak	Spacewatch	·	2.1 km	MPC · JPL
299804	2006 SF_{114}	—	September 23, 2006	Kitt Peak	Spacewatch	·	3.1 km	MPC · JPL
299805	2006 ST_{118}	—	September 24, 2006	Kitt Peak	Spacewatch	·	5.1 km	MPC · JPL
299806	2006 SQ_{120}	—	September 18, 2006	Catalina	CSS	·	2.9 km	MPC · JPL
299807	2006 SS_{120}	—	September 18, 2006	Catalina	CSS	·	3.0 km	MPC · JPL
299808	2006 SZ_{120}	—	September 18, 2006	Catalina	CSS	·	2.0 km	MPC · JPL
299809	2006 SS_{125}	—	September 20, 2006	Catalina	CSS	·	3.0 km	MPC · JPL
299810	2006 SD_{129}	—	September 17, 2006	Kitt Peak	Spacewatch	·	3.1 km	MPC · JPL
299811	2006 SH_{129}	—	September 18, 2006	Kitt Peak	Spacewatch	·	4.0 km	MPC · JPL
299812	2006 SA_{132}	—	September 16, 2006	Catalina	CSS	·	4.1 km	MPC · JPL
299813	2006 SG_{132}	—	September 16, 2006	Catalina	CSS	TEL	1.7 km	MPC · JPL
299814	2006 SC_{134}	—	September 18, 2006	Catalina	CSS	·	3.4 km	MPC · JPL
299815	2006 SM_{143}	—	September 19, 2006	Kitt Peak	Spacewatch	·	2.7 km	MPC · JPL
299816	2006 SA_{150}	—	September 19, 2006	Kitt Peak	Spacewatch	·	2.4 km	MPC · JPL
299817	2006 SQ_{154}	—	September 21, 2006	Anderson Mesa	LONEOS	·	3.7 km	MPC · JPL
299818	2006 SP_{156}	—	September 23, 2006	Kitt Peak	Spacewatch	KOR	1.6 km	MPC · JPL
299819	2006 SJ_{157}	—	September 23, 2001	Kitt Peak	Spacewatch	·	1.9 km	MPC · JPL
299820	2006 SO_{157}	—	September 23, 2006	Kitt Peak	Spacewatch	·	1.9 km	MPC · JPL
299821	2006 SW_{158}	—	September 23, 2006	Kitt Peak	Spacewatch	·	2.5 km	MPC · JPL
299822	2006 SB_{161}	—	September 23, 2006	Kitt Peak	Spacewatch	·	2.3 km	MPC · JPL
299823	2006 SF_{161}	—	September 23, 2006	Kitt Peak	Spacewatch	·	2.0 km	MPC · JPL
299824	2006 SY_{162}	—	September 24, 2006	Kitt Peak	Spacewatch	·	3.3 km	MPC · JPL
299825	2006 SR_{166}	—	September 25, 2006	Kitt Peak	Spacewatch	·	1.6 km	MPC · JPL
299826	2006 SC_{168}	—	September 25, 2006	Kitt Peak	Spacewatch	HYG	3.9 km	MPC · JPL
299827	2006 ST_{170}	—	September 25, 2006	Kitt Peak	Spacewatch	·	3.3 km	MPC · JPL
299828	2006 SM_{173}	—	September 25, 2006	Kitt Peak	Spacewatch	BRA	2.2 km	MPC · JPL
299829	2006 SF_{176}	—	September 25, 2006	Mount Lemmon	Mount Lemmon Survey	·	2.7 km	MPC · JPL
299830	2006 SX_{178}	—	September 25, 2006	Kitt Peak	Spacewatch	·	2.4 km	MPC · JPL
299831	2006 SF_{183}	—	September 25, 2006	Mount Lemmon	Mount Lemmon Survey	·	1.9 km	MPC · JPL
299832	2006 SB_{188}	—	September 26, 2006	Kitt Peak	Spacewatch	·	3.5 km	MPC · JPL
299833	2006 SE_{191}	—	September 26, 2006	Mount Lemmon	Mount Lemmon Survey	·	2.0 km	MPC · JPL
299834	2006 SH_{195}	—	September 26, 2006	Kitt Peak	Spacewatch	·	4.8 km	MPC · JPL
299835	2006 ST_{195}	—	September 26, 2006	Mount Lemmon	Mount Lemmon Survey	·	1.9 km	MPC · JPL
299836	2006 SH_{196}	—	September 26, 2006	Mount Lemmon	Mount Lemmon Survey	·	2.6 km	MPC · JPL
299837	2006 SX_{199}	—	September 24, 2006	Kitt Peak	Spacewatch	·	1.7 km	MPC · JPL
299838	2006 SO_{200}	—	September 24, 2006	Kitt Peak	Spacewatch	·	3.0 km	MPC · JPL
299839	2006 SY_{200}	—	September 24, 2006	Kitt Peak	Spacewatch	·	2.5 km	MPC · JPL
299840	2006 SO_{203}	—	September 25, 2006	Mount Lemmon	Mount Lemmon Survey	·	2.3 km	MPC · JPL
299841	2006 SQ_{203}	—	September 25, 2006	Kitt Peak	Spacewatch	·	1.9 km	MPC · JPL
299842	2006 SL_{204}	—	September 25, 2006	Kitt Peak	Spacewatch	·	2.4 km	MPC · JPL
299843	2006 SK_{216}	—	September 27, 2006	Kitt Peak	Spacewatch	EOS	2.0 km	MPC · JPL
299844	2006 SW_{220}	—	September 25, 2006	Mount Lemmon	Mount Lemmon Survey	KOR	1.8 km	MPC · JPL
299845	2006 SX_{221}	—	September 25, 2006	Mount Lemmon	Mount Lemmon Survey	KOR	1.7 km	MPC · JPL
299846	2006 SE_{227}	—	September 26, 2006	Kitt Peak	Spacewatch	EOS	2.1 km	MPC · JPL
299847	2006 SK_{228}	—	September 26, 2006	Kitt Peak	Spacewatch	·	2.3 km	MPC · JPL
299848	2006 SC_{238}	—	September 26, 2006	Kitt Peak	Spacewatch	KOR	1.6 km	MPC · JPL
299849	2006 SD_{240}	—	September 26, 2006	Kitt Peak	Spacewatch	EOS	2.2 km	MPC · JPL
299850	2006 ST_{244}	—	September 26, 2006	Kitt Peak	Spacewatch	·	2.4 km	MPC · JPL
299851	2006 SP_{245}	—	September 26, 2006	Kitt Peak	Spacewatch	·	2.0 km	MPC · JPL
299852	2006 SC_{254}	—	September 26, 2006	Mount Lemmon	Mount Lemmon Survey	KOR	1.4 km	MPC · JPL
299853	2006 ST_{254}	—	September 26, 2006	Mount Lemmon	Mount Lemmon Survey	KOR	1.6 km	MPC · JPL
299854	2006 SM_{256}	—	September 26, 2006	Kitt Peak	Spacewatch	·	4.0 km	MPC · JPL
299855	2006 SW_{258}	—	September 26, 2006	Kitt Peak	Spacewatch	KOR	1.5 km	MPC · JPL
299856	2006 SU_{259}	—	September 26, 2006	Mount Lemmon	Mount Lemmon Survey	·	2.3 km	MPC · JPL
299857	2006 SW_{261}	—	September 26, 2006	Mount Lemmon	Mount Lemmon Survey	·	3.5 km	MPC · JPL
299858	2006 SP_{262}	—	September 26, 2006	Mount Lemmon	Mount Lemmon Survey	·	3.3 km	MPC · JPL
299859	2006 SX_{262}	—	September 26, 2006	Mount Lemmon	Mount Lemmon Survey	EMA	3.9 km	MPC · JPL
299860	2006 SK_{267}	—	September 26, 2006	Kitt Peak	Spacewatch	HYG	3.5 km	MPC · JPL
299861	2006 SK_{268}	—	September 26, 2006	Kitt Peak	Spacewatch	·	2.7 km	MPC · JPL
299862	2006 SC_{269}	—	September 26, 2006	Kitt Peak	Spacewatch	·	2.1 km	MPC · JPL
299863	2006 SP_{273}	—	September 27, 2006	Mount Lemmon	Mount Lemmon Survey	EOS	2.6 km	MPC · JPL
299864	2006 ST_{273}	—	September 27, 2006	Mount Lemmon	Mount Lemmon Survey	VER	2.8 km	MPC · JPL
299865	2006 SX_{273}	—	September 27, 2006	Mount Lemmon	Mount Lemmon Survey	·	2.5 km	MPC · JPL
299866	2006 SF_{275}	—	September 27, 2006	Kitt Peak	Spacewatch	·	3.2 km	MPC · JPL
299867	2006 SN_{282}	—	September 25, 2006	Anderson Mesa	LONEOS	·	2.6 km	MPC · JPL
299868	2006 SR_{289}	—	September 26, 2006	Catalina	CSS	·	3.1 km	MPC · JPL
299869	2006 SA_{290}	—	September 27, 2006	Catalina	CSS	·	5.1 km	MPC · JPL
299870	2006 SY_{292}	—	September 25, 2006	Kitt Peak	Spacewatch	·	2.4 km	MPC · JPL
299871	2006 SL_{293}	—	September 25, 2006	Kitt Peak	Spacewatch	·	3.3 km	MPC · JPL
299872	2006 SB_{294}	—	September 25, 2006	Kitt Peak	Spacewatch	·	2.3 km	MPC · JPL
299873	2006 SM_{297}	—	September 25, 2006	Mount Lemmon	Mount Lemmon Survey	·	2.1 km	MPC · JPL
299874	2006 SU_{297}	—	September 25, 2006	Anderson Mesa	LONEOS	EOS	3.0 km	MPC · JPL
299875	2006 SV_{297}	—	September 25, 2006	Anderson Mesa	LONEOS	·	3.4 km	MPC · JPL
299876	2006 SR_{302}	—	September 27, 2006	Kitt Peak	Spacewatch	·	1.7 km	MPC · JPL
299877	2006 SB_{304}	—	September 27, 2006	Mount Lemmon	Mount Lemmon Survey	·	1.9 km	MPC · JPL
299878	2006 SH_{312}	—	September 27, 2006	Mount Lemmon	Mount Lemmon Survey	·	2.9 km	MPC · JPL
299879	2006 SU_{313}	—	September 27, 2006	Kitt Peak	Spacewatch	·	2.2 km	MPC · JPL
299880	2006 SP_{314}	—	September 27, 2006	Kitt Peak	Spacewatch	·	3.0 km	MPC · JPL
299881	2006 SQ_{319}	—	September 27, 2006	Kitt Peak	Spacewatch	·	1.9 km	MPC · JPL
299882	2006 SV_{325}	—	September 27, 2006	Kitt Peak	Spacewatch	·	3.8 km	MPC · JPL
299883	2006 SL_{332}	—	September 28, 2006	Mount Lemmon	Mount Lemmon Survey	EOS	1.9 km	MPC · JPL
299884	2006 SP_{332}	—	September 28, 2006	Mount Lemmon	Mount Lemmon Survey	·	3.6 km	MPC · JPL
299885	2006 SE_{333}	—	September 28, 2006	Kitt Peak	Spacewatch	EOS	2.2 km	MPC · JPL
299886	2006 SG_{333}	—	September 28, 2006	Kitt Peak	Spacewatch	KOR	1.7 km	MPC · JPL
299887	2006 ST_{335}	—	September 28, 2006	Kitt Peak	Spacewatch	·	3.3 km	MPC · JPL
299888	2006 SL_{339}	—	September 28, 2006	Kitt Peak	Spacewatch	·	2.4 km	MPC · JPL
299889	2006 SC_{341}	—	September 28, 2006	Kitt Peak	Spacewatch	EOS	2.4 km	MPC · JPL
299890	2006 SD_{341}	—	September 28, 2006	Kitt Peak	Spacewatch	EOS	2.1 km	MPC · JPL
299891	2006 SN_{345}	—	September 28, 2006	Kitt Peak	Spacewatch	·	2.7 km	MPC · JPL
299892	2006 SF_{346}	—	September 28, 2006	Kitt Peak	Spacewatch	·	2.9 km	MPC · JPL
299893	2006 SP_{348}	—	September 28, 2006	Kitt Peak	Spacewatch	·	2.0 km	MPC · JPL
299894	2006 SZ_{351}	—	September 30, 2006	Catalina	CSS	·	2.9 km	MPC · JPL
299895	2006 SN_{352}	—	September 30, 2006	Catalina	CSS	·	2.8 km	MPC · JPL
299896	2006 SP_{360}	—	September 30, 2006	Mount Lemmon	Mount Lemmon Survey	EOS	1.8 km	MPC · JPL
299897 Skipitis	2006 SE_{369}	Skipitis	September 23, 2006	Moletai	K. Černis	·	2.9 km	MPC · JPL
299898	2006 SB_{373}	—	September 28, 2006	Mount Lemmon	Mount Lemmon Survey	·	3.2 km	MPC · JPL
299899	2006 SH_{373}	—	September 16, 2006	Apache Point	A. C. Becker	·	2.3 km	MPC · JPL
299900	2006 SJ_{373}	—	September 16, 2006	Apache Point	A. C. Becker	·	2.6 km	MPC · JPL

== 299901–300000 ==
back to top

Designation			Discovery			Properties		Ref
Permanent	Provisional	Named after	Date	Site	Discoverer(s)	Category	Diam.	Ref
299901	2006 SJ_{374}	—	September 16, 2006	Apache Point	A. C. Becker	·	2.1 km	MPC · JPL
299902	2006 SR_{374}	—	September 16, 2006	Apache Point	A. C. Becker	EOS	1.9 km	MPC · JPL
299903	2006 SJ_{375}	—	September 17, 2006	Apache Point	A. C. Becker	KOR	1.9 km	MPC · JPL
299904	2006 SJ_{377}	—	September 17, 2006	Apache Point	A. C. Becker	·	3.5 km	MPC · JPL
299905	2006 SM_{380}	—	September 27, 2006	Apache Point	A. C. Becker	URS	4.7 km	MPC · JPL
299906	2006 SO_{380}	—	September 27, 2006	Apache Point	A. C. Becker	·	3.4 km	MPC · JPL
299907	2006 SX_{382}	—	September 28, 2006	Apache Point	A. C. Becker	·	2.4 km	MPC · JPL
299908	2006 ST_{390}	—	September 17, 2006	Kitt Peak	Spacewatch	KOR	1.3 km	MPC · JPL
299909	2006 SZ_{391}	—	September 19, 2006	Anderson Mesa	LONEOS	·	2.8 km	MPC · JPL
299910	2006 SB_{394}	—	September 30, 2006	Kitt Peak	Spacewatch	·	4.3 km	MPC · JPL
299911	2006 SV_{397}	—	September 26, 2006	Kitt Peak	Spacewatch	·	5.0 km	MPC · JPL
299912	2006 SK_{398}	—	September 16, 2006	Kitt Peak	Spacewatch	·	2.3 km	MPC · JPL
299913	2006 SZ_{400}	—	September 26, 2006	Kitt Peak	Spacewatch	·	4.1 km	MPC · JPL
299914	2006 SW_{404}	—	September 30, 2006	Mount Lemmon	Mount Lemmon Survey	·	3.1 km	MPC · JPL
299915	2006 SD_{405}	—	September 28, 2006	Mount Lemmon	Mount Lemmon Survey	·	2.6 km	MPC · JPL
299916	2006 SG_{406}	—	September 20, 2006	Kitt Peak	Spacewatch	·	2.6 km	MPC · JPL
299917	2006 SR_{407}	—	September 24, 2006	Kitt Peak	Spacewatch	EOS	1.7 km	MPC · JPL
299918	2006 SQ_{409}	—	September 17, 2006	Kitt Peak	Spacewatch	·	2.4 km	MPC · JPL
299919	2006 TZ	—	October 3, 2006	Great Shefford	Birtwhistle, P.	EOS	2.6 km	MPC · JPL
299920	2006 TZ_{2}	—	October 2, 2006	Kitt Peak	Spacewatch	KOR	1.8 km	MPC · JPL
299921	2006 TM_{4}	—	October 2, 2006	Mount Lemmon	Mount Lemmon Survey	BRA	1.7 km	MPC · JPL
299922	2006 TY_{6}	—	October 4, 2006	Great Shefford	Birtwhistle, P.	EOS	2.0 km	MPC · JPL
299923	2006 TP_{8}	—	October 4, 2006	Mount Lemmon	Mount Lemmon Survey	·	1.3 km	MPC · JPL
299924	2006 TW_{8}	—	October 11, 2006	Kitt Peak	Spacewatch	THM	2.4 km	MPC · JPL
299925	2006 TW_{10}	—	October 12, 2006	Kitt Peak	Spacewatch	EOS	2.1 km	MPC · JPL
299926	2006 TE_{11}	—	October 13, 2006	Kitt Peak	Spacewatch	·	4.0 km	MPC · JPL
299927	2006 TC_{15}	—	October 11, 2006	Kitt Peak	Spacewatch	·	3.3 km	MPC · JPL
299928	2006 TQ_{18}	—	October 11, 2006	Kitt Peak	Spacewatch	·	3.0 km	MPC · JPL
299929	2006 TG_{21}	—	October 11, 2006	Kitt Peak	Spacewatch	THM	2.5 km	MPC · JPL
299930	2006 TZ_{23}	—	October 11, 2006	Kitt Peak	Spacewatch	·	2.8 km	MPC · JPL
299931	2006 TH_{27}	—	October 12, 2006	Kitt Peak	Spacewatch	·	2.2 km	MPC · JPL
299932	2006 TF_{33}	—	October 12, 2006	Kitt Peak	Spacewatch	·	3.9 km	MPC · JPL
299933	2006 TJ_{34}	—	October 12, 2006	Kitt Peak	Spacewatch	·	3.9 km	MPC · JPL
299934	2006 TH_{35}	—	October 12, 2006	Kitt Peak	Spacewatch	HYG	3.0 km	MPC · JPL
299935	2006 TH_{38}	—	October 12, 2006	Kitt Peak	Spacewatch	THM	2.4 km	MPC · JPL
299936	2006 TU_{38}	—	October 12, 2006	Kitt Peak	Spacewatch	THM	1.9 km	MPC · JPL
299937	2006 TU_{39}	—	October 12, 2006	Kitt Peak	Spacewatch	·	2.5 km	MPC · JPL
299938	2006 TP_{40}	—	October 12, 2006	Kitt Peak	Spacewatch	THM	2.3 km	MPC · JPL
299939	2006 TP_{42}	—	October 12, 2006	Kitt Peak	Spacewatch	·	2.7 km	MPC · JPL
299940	2006 TG_{43}	—	October 12, 2006	Kitt Peak	Spacewatch	·	3.7 km	MPC · JPL
299941	2006 TK_{43}	—	October 12, 2006	Kitt Peak	Spacewatch	·	3.0 km	MPC · JPL
299942	2006 TB_{48}	—	October 12, 2006	Kitt Peak	Spacewatch	·	4.4 km	MPC · JPL
299943	2006 TX_{50}	—	October 12, 2006	Kitt Peak	Spacewatch	·	3.4 km	MPC · JPL
299944	2006 TD_{52}	—	October 12, 2006	Kitt Peak	Spacewatch	·	4.3 km	MPC · JPL
299945	2006 TU_{53}	—	October 12, 2006	Kitt Peak	Spacewatch	THM	2.9 km	MPC · JPL
299946	2006 TR_{54}	—	October 12, 2006	Palomar	NEAT	·	4.2 km	MPC · JPL
299947	2006 TC_{55}	—	October 12, 2006	Palomar	NEAT	·	3.7 km	MPC · JPL
299948	2006 TT_{56}	—	October 14, 2006	Eskridge	Farpoint	EOS	2.9 km	MPC · JPL
299949	2006 TD_{59}	—	October 13, 2006	Kitt Peak	Spacewatch	·	3.4 km	MPC · JPL
299950	2006 TQ_{59}	—	October 13, 2006	Kitt Peak	Spacewatch	·	4.0 km	MPC · JPL
299951	2006 TM_{60}	—	October 13, 2006	Kitt Peak	Spacewatch	·	3.2 km	MPC · JPL
299952	2006 TS_{60}	—	October 14, 2006	Bergisch Gladbach	W. Bickel	·	2.6 km	MPC · JPL
299953	2006 TP_{63}	—	October 10, 2006	Palomar	NEAT	·	4.2 km	MPC · JPL
299954	2006 TX_{65}	—	October 11, 2006	Kitt Peak	Spacewatch	·	3.1 km	MPC · JPL
299955	2006 TC_{68}	—	October 11, 2006	Palomar	NEAT	·	3.9 km	MPC · JPL
299956	2006 TD_{71}	—	October 11, 2006	Palomar	NEAT	·	3.3 km	MPC · JPL
299957	2006 TB_{72}	—	October 11, 2006	Palomar	NEAT	EOS	2.3 km	MPC · JPL
299958	2006 TB_{73}	—	October 11, 2006	Palomar	NEAT	·	4.8 km	MPC · JPL
299959	2006 TM_{76}	—	October 11, 2006	Palomar	NEAT	·	2.7 km	MPC · JPL
299960	2006 TY_{77}	—	October 12, 2006	Palomar	NEAT	·	2.9 km	MPC · JPL
299961	2006 TU_{78}	—	October 12, 2006	Palomar	NEAT	EOS	2.9 km	MPC · JPL
299962	2006 TV_{78}	—	October 12, 2006	Palomar	NEAT	·	3.6 km	MPC · JPL
299963	2006 TH_{79}	—	October 12, 2006	Kitt Peak	Spacewatch	·	4.3 km	MPC · JPL
299964	2006 TQ_{79}	—	October 13, 2006	Kitt Peak	Spacewatch	·	3.6 km	MPC · JPL
299965	2006 TK_{81}	—	October 13, 2006	Kitt Peak	Spacewatch	·	3.9 km	MPC · JPL
299966	2006 TS_{82}	—	October 13, 2006	Kitt Peak	Spacewatch	·	4.1 km	MPC · JPL
299967	2006 TS_{90}	—	October 13, 2006	Kitt Peak	Spacewatch	·	3.3 km	MPC · JPL
299968	2006 TV_{90}	—	October 13, 2006	Kitt Peak	Spacewatch	·	3.8 km	MPC · JPL
299969	2006 TL_{93}	—	October 15, 2006	Kitt Peak	Spacewatch	EOS	2.3 km	MPC · JPL
299970	2006 TG_{95}	—	October 13, 2006	Lulin	Lin, C.-S., Q. Ye	·	2.9 km	MPC · JPL
299971	2006 TS_{95}	—	October 12, 2006	Kitt Peak	Spacewatch	·	2.5 km	MPC · JPL
299972	2006 TP_{96}	—	October 12, 2006	Palomar	NEAT	EOS	2.8 km	MPC · JPL
299973	2006 TG_{100}	—	October 15, 2006	Kitt Peak	Spacewatch	·	2.8 km	MPC · JPL
299974	2006 TQ_{102}	—	October 15, 2006	Kitt Peak	Spacewatch	·	2.7 km	MPC · JPL
299975	2006 TF_{110}	—	October 13, 2006	Kitt Peak	Spacewatch	·	3.1 km	MPC · JPL
299976	2006 TT_{111}	—	October 1, 2006	Apache Point	A. C. Becker	·	2.8 km	MPC · JPL
299977	2006 TA_{112}	—	October 1, 2006	Apache Point	A. C. Becker	·	3.2 km	MPC · JPL
299978	2006 TH_{112}	—	October 1, 2006	Apache Point	A. C. Becker	·	3.9 km	MPC · JPL
299979	2006 TT_{119}	—	October 11, 2006	Apache Point	A. C. Becker	T_{j} (2.98)	4.0 km	MPC · JPL
299980	2006 TD_{121}	—	October 12, 2006	Apache Point	A. C. Becker	·	3.1 km	MPC · JPL
299981	2006 TM_{121}	—	October 2, 2006	Mount Lemmon	Mount Lemmon Survey	VER	2.8 km	MPC · JPL
299982	2006 TC_{124}	—	October 2, 2006	Mount Lemmon	Mount Lemmon Survey	·	2.5 km	MPC · JPL
299983	2006 TW_{125}	—	October 13, 2006	Kitt Peak	Spacewatch	·	2.3 km	MPC · JPL
299984	2006 TC_{126}	—	October 13, 2006	Kitt Peak	Spacewatch	THM	1.7 km	MPC · JPL
299985	2006 UQ_{8}	—	October 16, 2006	Catalina	CSS	·	4.2 km	MPC · JPL
299986	2006 UN_{9}	—	October 16, 2006	Kitt Peak	Spacewatch	LIX	4.2 km	MPC · JPL
299987	2006 UW_{11}	—	October 17, 2006	Mount Lemmon	Mount Lemmon Survey	·	2.9 km	MPC · JPL
299988	2006 UT_{13}	—	October 17, 2006	Mount Lemmon	Mount Lemmon Survey	·	2.6 km	MPC · JPL
299989	2006 UF_{14}	—	October 17, 2006	Mount Lemmon	Mount Lemmon Survey	·	1.9 km	MPC · JPL
299990	2006 UE_{15}	—	October 17, 2006	Mount Lemmon	Mount Lemmon Survey	·	4.0 km	MPC · JPL
299991	2006 UV_{15}	—	October 17, 2006	Mount Lemmon	Mount Lemmon Survey	·	3.8 km	MPC · JPL
299992	2006 UY_{15}	—	October 17, 2006	Mount Lemmon	Mount Lemmon Survey	·	3.4 km	MPC · JPL
299993	2006 US_{19}	—	October 16, 2006	Kitt Peak	Spacewatch	EOS	2.0 km	MPC · JPL
299994	2006 UK_{20}	—	October 16, 2006	Kitt Peak	Spacewatch	·	2.0 km	MPC · JPL
299995	2006 UJ_{24}	—	October 16, 2006	Kitt Peak	Spacewatch	·	2.3 km	MPC · JPL
299996	2006 UL_{26}	—	October 16, 2006	Kitt Peak	Spacewatch	THM	2.5 km	MPC · JPL
299997	2006 UE_{27}	—	October 16, 2006	Kitt Peak	Spacewatch	·	2.8 km	MPC · JPL
299998	2006 UU_{28}	—	October 16, 2006	Kitt Peak	Spacewatch	EOS	2.1 km	MPC · JPL
299999	2006 UE_{30}	—	October 16, 2006	Kitt Peak	Spacewatch	EOS	2.2 km	MPC · JPL
300000	2006 UW_{30}	—	October 16, 2006	Kitt Peak	Spacewatch	THM	2.0 km	MPC · JPL

back to top

== See also ==
- Meanings of minor-planet names: 299001–300000
