= Meanings of minor-planet names: 299001–300000 =

As minor planet discoveries are confirmed, they are given a permanent number by the IAU's Minor Planet Center (MPC), and the discoverers can then submit names for them, following the IAU's naming conventions. The list below concerns those minor planets in the specified number-range that have received names, and explains the meanings of those names.

Official naming citations of newly named small Solar System bodies are approved and published in a bulletin by IAU's Working Group for Small Bodies Nomenclature (WGSBN). Before May 2021, citations were published in MPC's Minor Planet Circulars for many decades. Recent citations can also be found on the JPL Small-Body Database (SBDB). Until his death in 2016, German astronomer Lutz D. Schmadel compiled these citations into the Dictionary of Minor Planet Names (DMP) and regularly updated the collection.

Based on Paul Herget's The Names of the Minor Planets, Schmadel also researched the unclear origin of numerous asteroids, most of which had been named prior to World War II. This article incorporates text from this source, which is in the public domain: SBDB New namings may only be added to this list below after official publication as the preannouncement of names is condemned. The WGSBN publishes a comprehensive guideline for the naming rules of non-cometary small Solar System bodies.

== 299001–299100 ==
Named minor planet	Provisional	This minor planet was named for...	Ref · Catalog
299020 Chennaoui	2005 AR_{3}	Hasnaa Chennaoui Aoudjehane (born 1964), a Moroccan geochemist at Hassan II University in Casablanca. She is a member of the Nomenclature Committee of Meteorites, and former council member, of the Meteoritical Society. She classified and named nine observed falls in Morocco, including Tissint, the fifth Martian meteorite fall (Src).	JPL · 299020

== 299101–299200 ==
back to top

Named minor planet	Provisional	This minor planet was named for...	Ref · Catalog
299134 Moggicecchi	2005 EB_{224}	Vanni Moggi Cecchi (born 1965), an Italian mineralogist and meteoriticist, who was the Curator of the Museum of Planetary Sciences in Prato, Tuscany	JPL · 299134

== 299201–299300 ==
back to top

Named minor planet	Provisional	This minor planet was named for...	Ref · Catalog
There are no named minor planets in this number range

== 299301–299400 ==
back to top

Named minor planet	Provisional	This minor planet was named for...	Ref · Catalog
299362 Marthacole	2005 TK_{27}	Martha Cole (born 1945) was a professional photographer based in San Diego, California, in the 1980s and 1990s.	JPL · 299362

== 299401–299500 ==
back to top

Named minor planet	Provisional	This minor planet was named for...	Ref · Catalog
There are no named minor planets in this number range

== 299501–299600 ==
back to top

Named minor planet	Provisional	This minor planet was named for...	Ref · Catalog
299518 Metchev	2006 CX_{63}	Stanimir A. Metchev (b. 1976), a Bulgarian-Canadian Professor and Canada Research Chair at the University of Western Ontario in London, Canada.	IAU · 299518

== 299601–299700 ==
back to top

Named minor planet	Provisional	This minor planet was named for...	Ref · Catalog
299631 Kayliegreen	2006 JP_{68}	Kaylie Green (1990–2023), Canadian PhD student in astronomy at the University of Western Ontario.	IAU · 299631

== 299701–299800 ==
back to top

Named minor planet	Provisional	This minor planet was named for...	Ref · Catalog
299755 Ericmontellese	2006 RB_{106}	Eric Montellese (born 1981), an American software and computer engineer	JPL · 299755
299756 Kerryaileen	2006 RO_{109}	Kerry Aileen Masiero (born 1984), sister of American astronomer Joseph Masiero who discovered this minor planet	JPL · 299756
299777 Tanyastreeter	2006 SN_{63}	Tanya Streeter (born 1973), a British-Caymanian-American champion freediver. She held the freediving record with a depth of 525 feet (160 meters).	IAU · 299777
299785 Alexeymolchanov	2006 SC_{77}	Alexey Molchanov (b. 1987), a Russian freediver.	IAU · 299785
299792 Celeritas	2006 SY_{93}	The speed of light in vacuum, commonly denoted c, is a universal physical constant that is equal to 299,792,458 meters per second. The word "celeritas" means "speed" in Latin.	IAU · 299792

== 299801–299900 ==
back to top

Named minor planet	Provisional	This minor planet was named for...	Ref · Catalog
299897 Skipitis	2006 SE_{369}	Raimundas Skipitis (b. 1959), a Lithuanian amateur astronomers.	IAU · 299897

== 299901–300000 ==
back to top

Named minor planet	Provisional	This minor planet was named for...	Ref · Catalog
There are no named minor planets in this number range

back to top

Preceded by 298,001–299,000	Meanings of minor-planet names List of minor planets: 299,001–300,000	Succeeded by 300,001–301,000
