= Downtown Jacksonville Multiple Property Submission =

- Downtown Jacksonville MPS
- U.S. National Register of Historic Places
- Location within Florida Location within the United States
- Location: Jacksonville, Florida
- Coordinates: 30°19′34″N 81°39′30″W
- MPS: Historic Buildings of Downtown Jacksonville, Florida
- NRHP reference No.: 64500102

The Downtown Jacksonville Multiple Property Submission is a Multiple Property Submission (MPS) of historic buildings to the National Register of Historic Places in Jacksonville, Florida. It consists of eleven properties in Downtown Jacksonville that were added to the National Register between 1992 and 2007.

Resource Name	Also known as	Address	City/County	Added
Buckman and Ulmer Building		29-33 West Monroe Street	Jacksonville, Duval County	December 30, 1992
Church of the Immaculate Conception		121 East Duval Street	Jacksonville, Duval County	December 30, 1992
Groover-Stewart Drug Company Building	McKesson-Robbins Drug Company Building	25 North Market Street	Jacksonville, Duval County	December 30, 1992
Mount Zion AME Church		201 East Beaver Street	Jacksonville, Duval County	December 30, 1992
Plaza Hotel		353 East Forsyth Street	Jacksonville, Duval County	December 30, 1992
South Atlantic Investment Corporation Building		35-39 West Monroe Street	Jacksonville, Duval County	December 30, 1992
Atlantic National Bank Annex		118 West Adams Street	Jacksonville, Duval County	November 7, 1997
Elks Club Building		201-213 North Laura Street	Jacksonville, Duval County	March 9, 2000
Lynch Building	American Heritage Life Building	11 Forsyth Street	Jacksonville, Duval County	December 23, 2003
W. A. Knight Building	Peninsular Building or Greenleaf & Crosby Annex	113 West Adams Street	Jacksonville, Duval County	March 15, 2005
Hutchinson-Suddath Building		315-319 East Bay Street	Jacksonville, Duval County	October 3, 2007

== See also ==
- National Register of Historic Places listings in Duval County, Florida
