= Laura Street =

Street in Jacksonville

Coordinates: 30.32732°N 81.65922°W

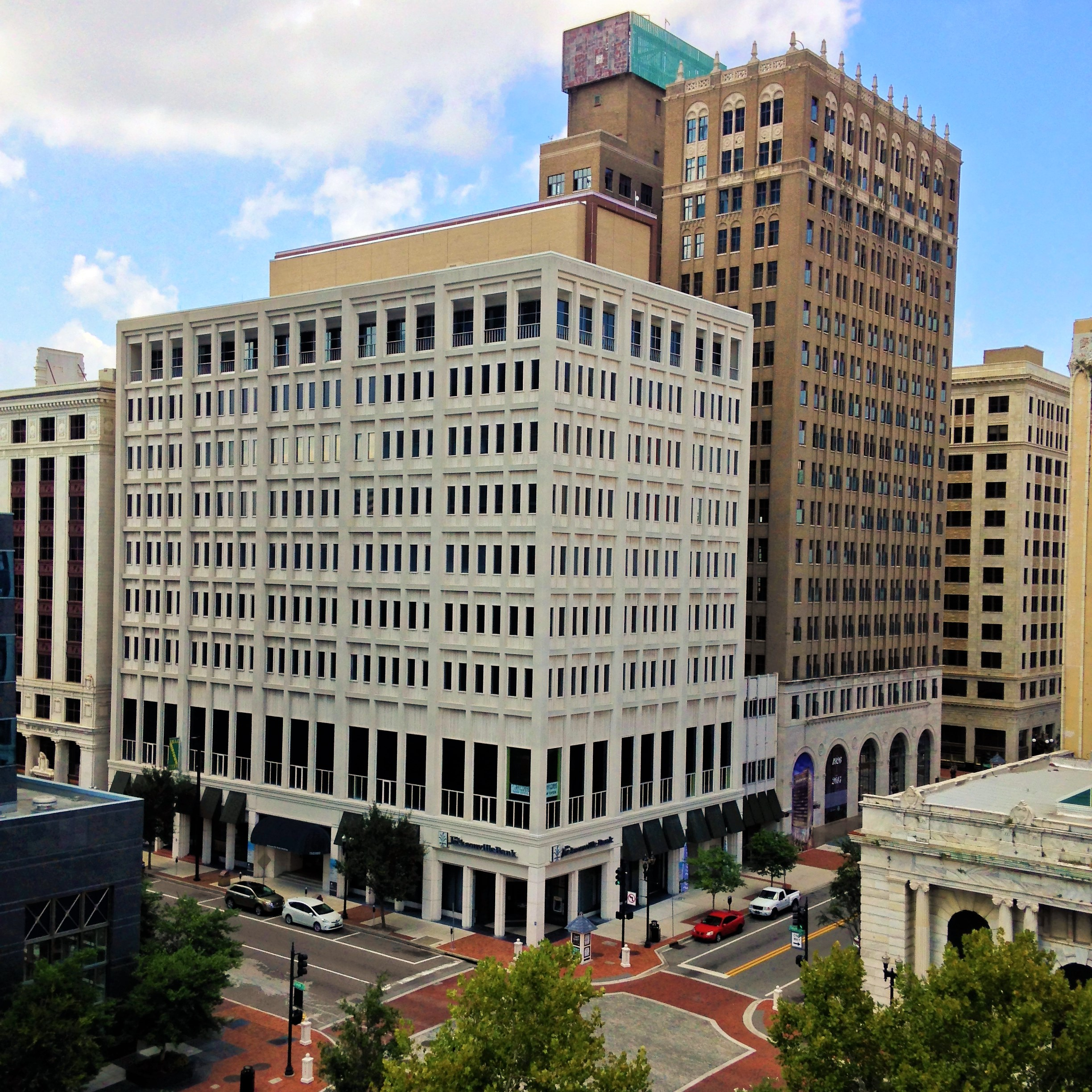
- View from the Bank of America Tower looking toward James Weldon Johnson Park
- Interactive map of Laura Street
- Owner: City of Jacksonville
- Maintained by: Department of Public Works
- Postal code: 32202, 32206
- Nearest metro station: Monorail: James Weldon Johnson Park Station; Rosa Parks Transit Station
- North end: 12th Street in Springfield (contiguous segment)
- South end: Independent Drive in Northbank

Laura Street is a north–south street in Jacksonville, Florida, United States, named for the daughter of the city's founder, Isaiah D. Hart. Historically, the downtown portion of Laura Street has been considered the financial district of Jacksonville.

== Description ==
The street's contiguous segment runs from 12th Street in the historic neighborhood of Springfield south through downtown, terminating at Independent Drive. South of State Street, Laura Street runs through the core of downtown's Northbank, and is one of the busiest pedestrian streets in the city.

Serving as an important corridor connecting a high concentration of office blocks, the area has historically functioned as a preeminent shopping and financial district, and has remained an important economic and cultural epicenter for the region. The street is also home to Jacksonville's oldest park, James Weldon Johnson Park (formerly Hemming Park), the Riverfront Plaza, Main Public Library, the Museum of Contemporary Art Jacksonville, and City Hall.

== History ==
Laura Street was named for the daughter of Jacksonville's founder, Isaiah D. Hart. In 1856, the city's oldest public park was designated along Laura Street, occupying the entire city block bordered by Monroe, Hogan and Duval Streets. The area attracted numerous hotels, most notably the St. James Hotel, completed in 1869, and the Windsor Hotel, completed in 1875.

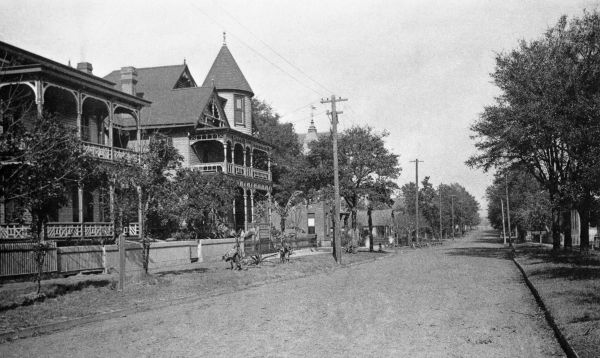
Laura Street in 1894

The Great Fire of 1901 ravaged almost the entirety of today's modern downtown core, including much of Laura Street. The street did act as a fire line between the junctions of Adams Street through to the St. Johns River. Just as in the 1871 Great Chicago Fire, the massive level of destruction left in the wake of the fire precipitated a robust period growth and a building boom that would last up until the Great Depression. The corridor between Adams Street, where a remaining portion of the business district still existed, and Hemming Park, was the center of much of the more notable commercial development.

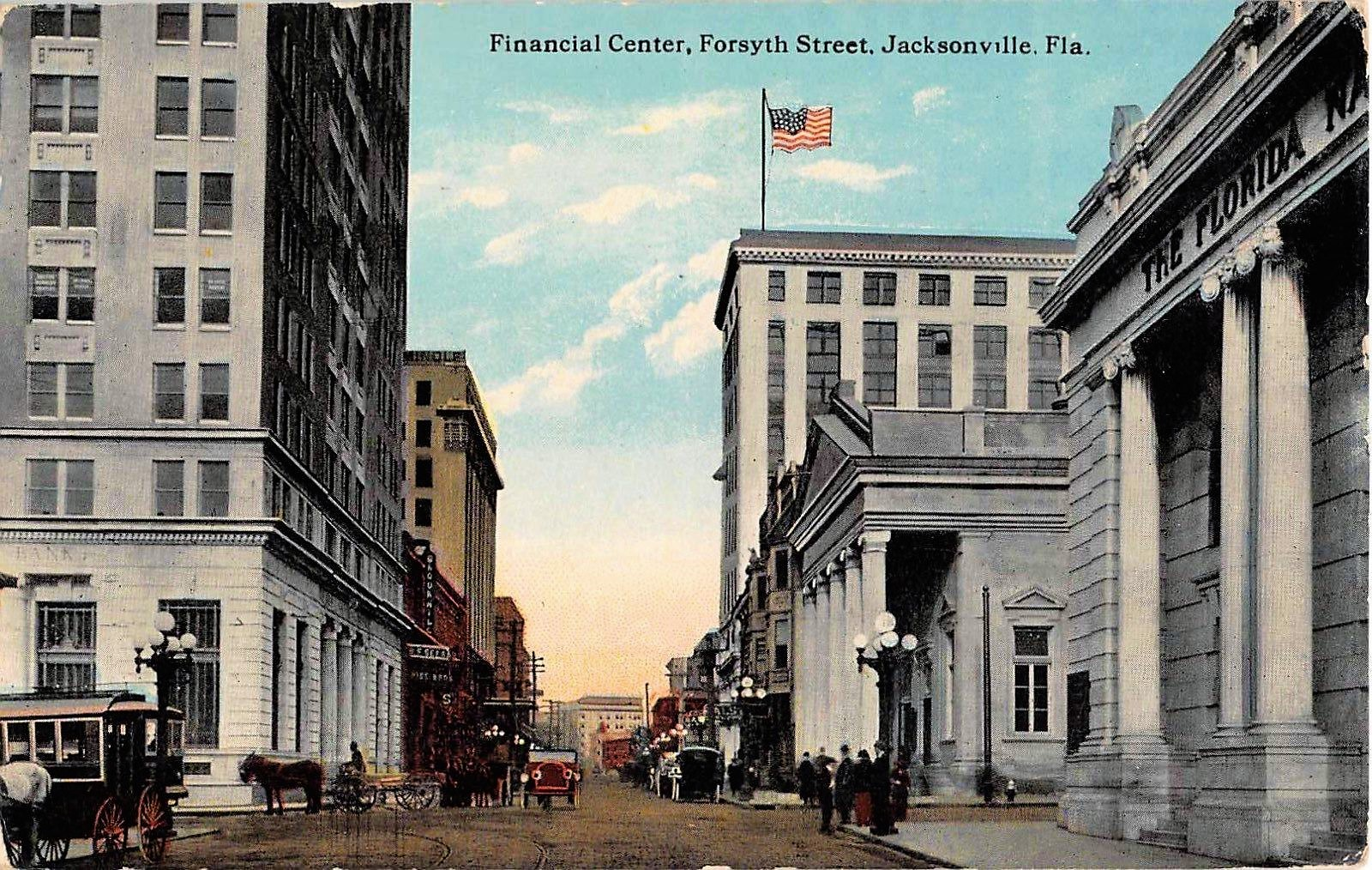
Postcard depicting the Financial Center of Jacksonville, c.1910

Originally the Mercantile Exchange Bank Building, one of the first buildings to be built after the fire was the Old Florida National Bank in 1902. It was designed by Edward H. Glidden in the Classical Revival style, and is now part of a group of buildings known as the Laura Street Trio. Architect Henry John Klutho designed the other two buildings: the Bisbee Building in 1908, and the Florida Life Building in 1911, both designed in the Chicago school of architecture. He also designed the YMCA Building in 1909, and the St. James Building in 1912. New York architecture firm Mowbray and Uffinger contributed two significant structures to the corridor during this period. In 1909, 121 Atlantic Place, originally Atlantic National Bank Building, opened as the tallest building in Florida. Barnett National Bank Building opened its doors in 1926, also breaking the state height record. Local architecture firm Marsh & Saxelbye also contributed multiple works along the route, including Karpeles Manuscript Library Museum (1921), Schultz Building (1926), Hotel George Washington (1926) and Greenleaf & Crosby Building (1928).

RTKL Associates Inc., a planning and consultant firm from Baltimore, was hired in 1970 to study the city's increasing urban blight related to suburbanization and the development of retail malls. The recommendations were included in the 1971 Downtown Master Plan drafted by the Downtown Development Authority. The plans called for creating a pedestrian mall, a one-way transportation loop and elevated walkways that would permitting safe movement from the retail core, centered on Hemming Park, to the riverfront. The plans further called for a riverfront park, convention center with attached hotel, an exhibition center, Sears Department Store, and a high-rise offices. Though many portions of the plan never came to fruition, a few of Laura Street's features are a result of the 1971 Downtown Master Plan, the most striking of which was the Wells Fargo Center, designed by Kemp, Bunch & Jackson in 1974 for the Independent Life Insurance Company.

In 2011, $2.3 million was spent to enhance the street by adding traffic calming features, more sidewalk space, trees with colorful uplighting and other hardscape features. In 2015, a five-block segment of Laura Street beginning at West Duval Street near Hemming Park, stretching to the Jacksonville Landing, and ending at East Independent Drive, was recognized by the American Planning Association as one of its "Great Places in America."

== Notable places ==
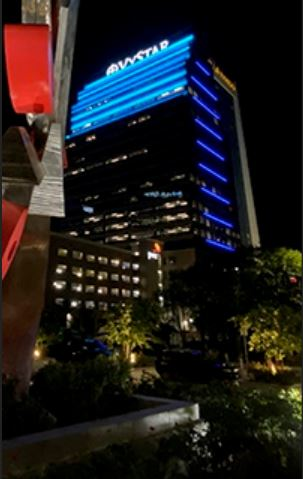
VyStar Tower

From south to north:

- Jacksonville Landing and Andrew Jackson Statue, Independent Drive
- VyStar Tower, Independent Drive
- Wells Fargo Center, between Independent Drive and Bay Street
- Bank of America Tower, between Bay and Forsyth Streets
- CenterState Bank Building, Forsyth Street
- 121 Atlantic Place, Forsyth Street
- Laura Street Trio, Forsyth Street
- Barnett National Bank Building, Adams Street
- Greenleaf & Crosby Building and Jacobs Jewelers Clock, Adams Street
- Elks Club Building, Adams Street
- The Carling, Adams Street
- Schultz Building, Adams Street
- Snyder Memorial Methodist Episcopal Church, Monroe Street
- Main branch of the Jacksonville Public Library, Monroe Street
- James Weldon Johnson Park, between Monroe and Duval Streets
- Museum of Contemporary Art Jacksonville, Duval Street
- City Hall (St. James Building), between Duval and Church Streets
- Florida State College at Jacksonville downtown campus, between State and 1st Streets
- Karpeles Manuscript Library Museum, 1st Street
- Klutho Park, 1st Street

== Transportation ==
The Jacksonville Landing is at the southern terminus of Laura Street and offers access to the Jacksonville Water Taxi as well as other marine services.

The Jacksonville Skyway serves two stations near Laura Street:

- James Weldon Johnson Park station at Monroe Street
- Rosa Parks Transit Station at State Street (central JTA bus station)

== Gallery ==
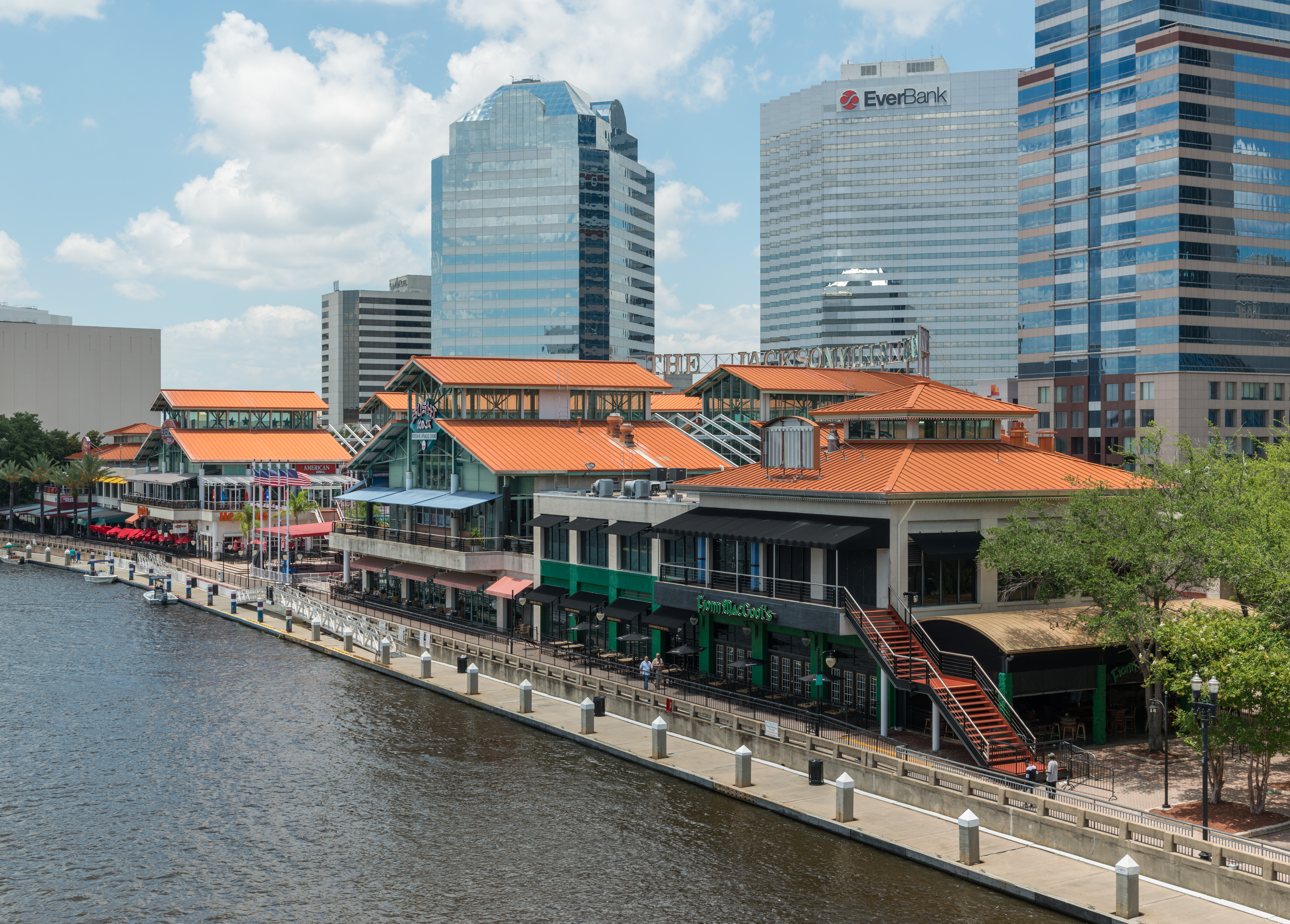
Jacksonville Landing and Riverwalk on the St. Johns River

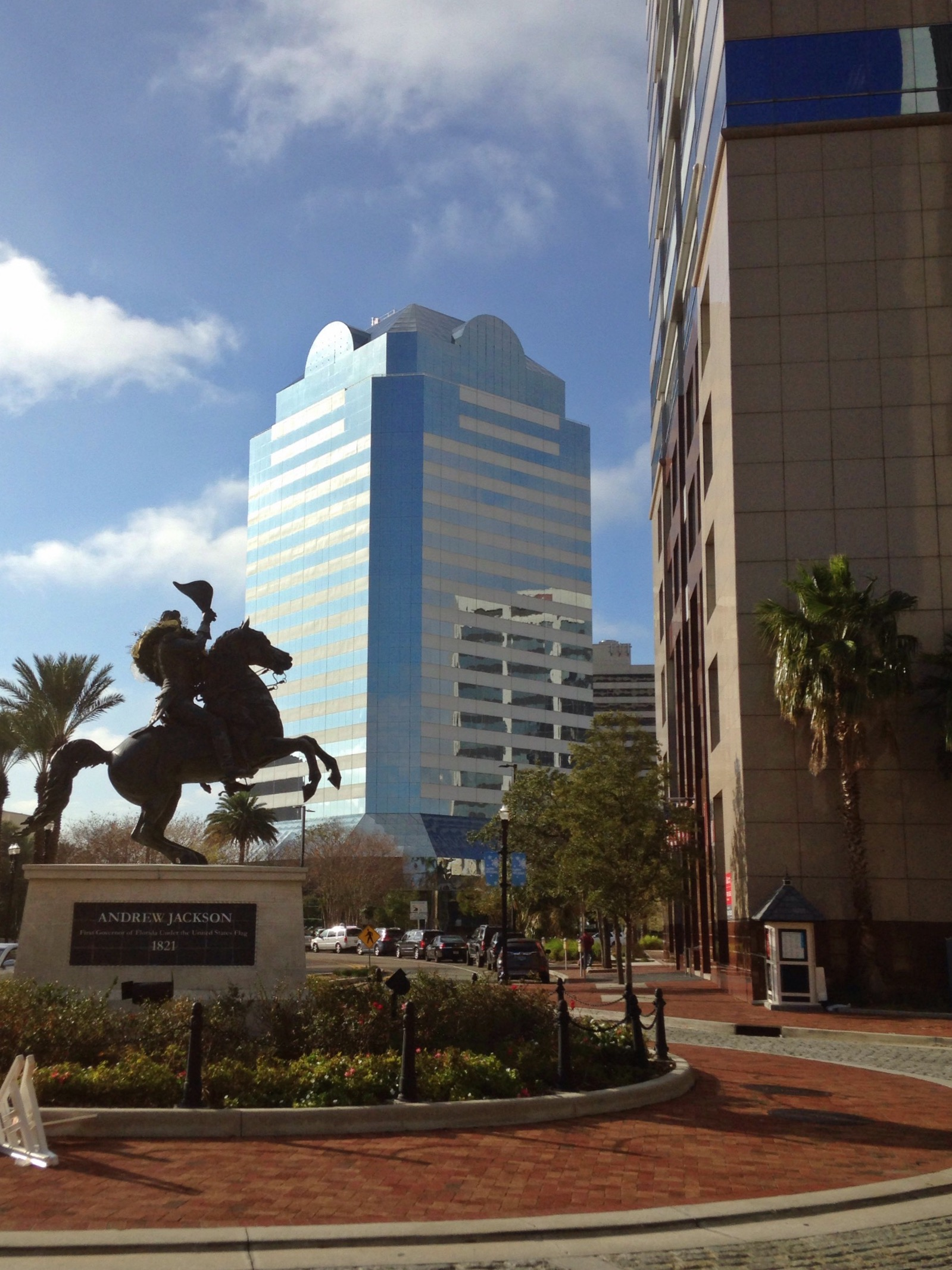
Statue of Andrew Jackson at the terminus of Laura Street at Independent Drive

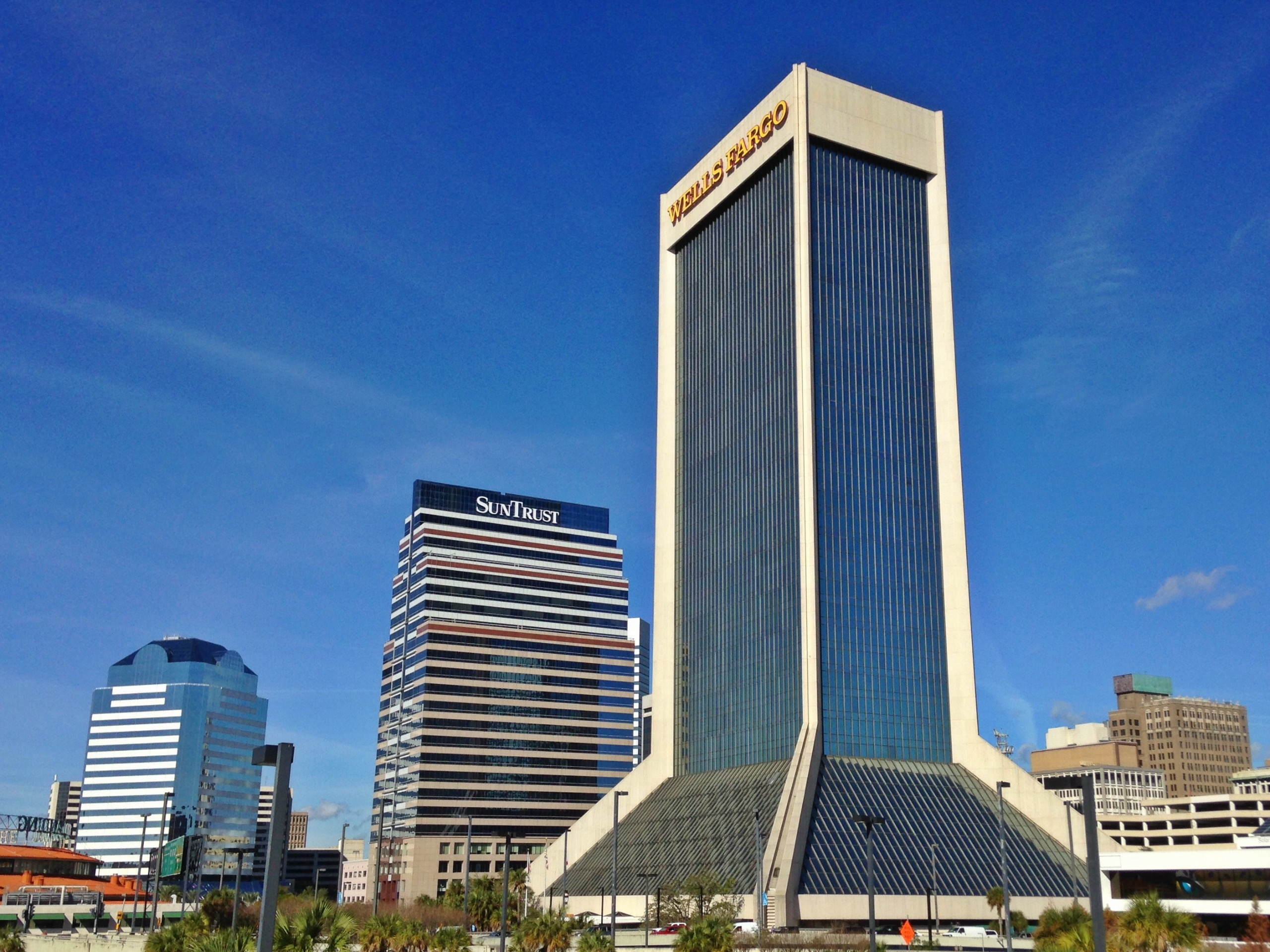
Wells Fargo Center

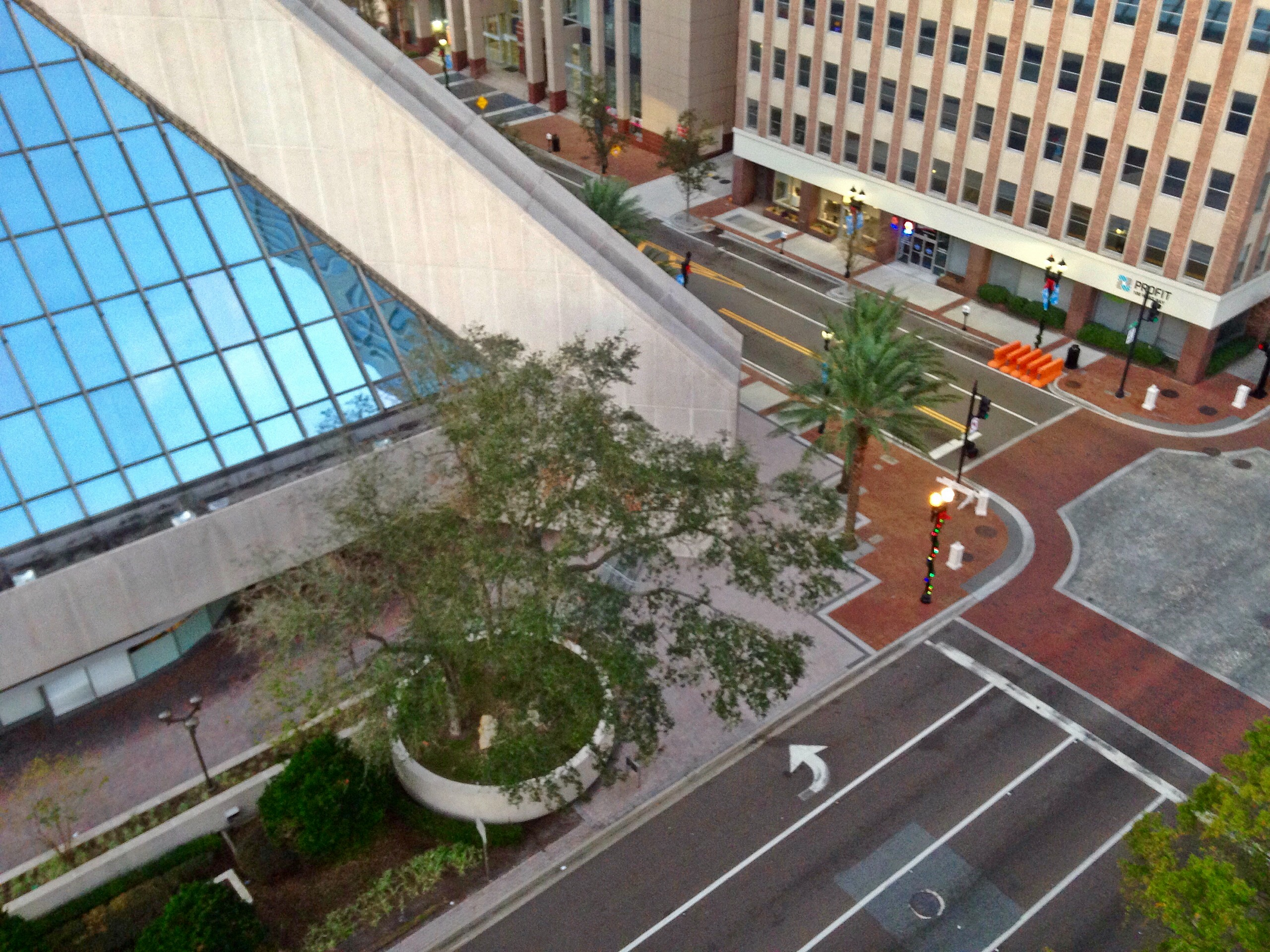
Corner of Laura and Bay Streets

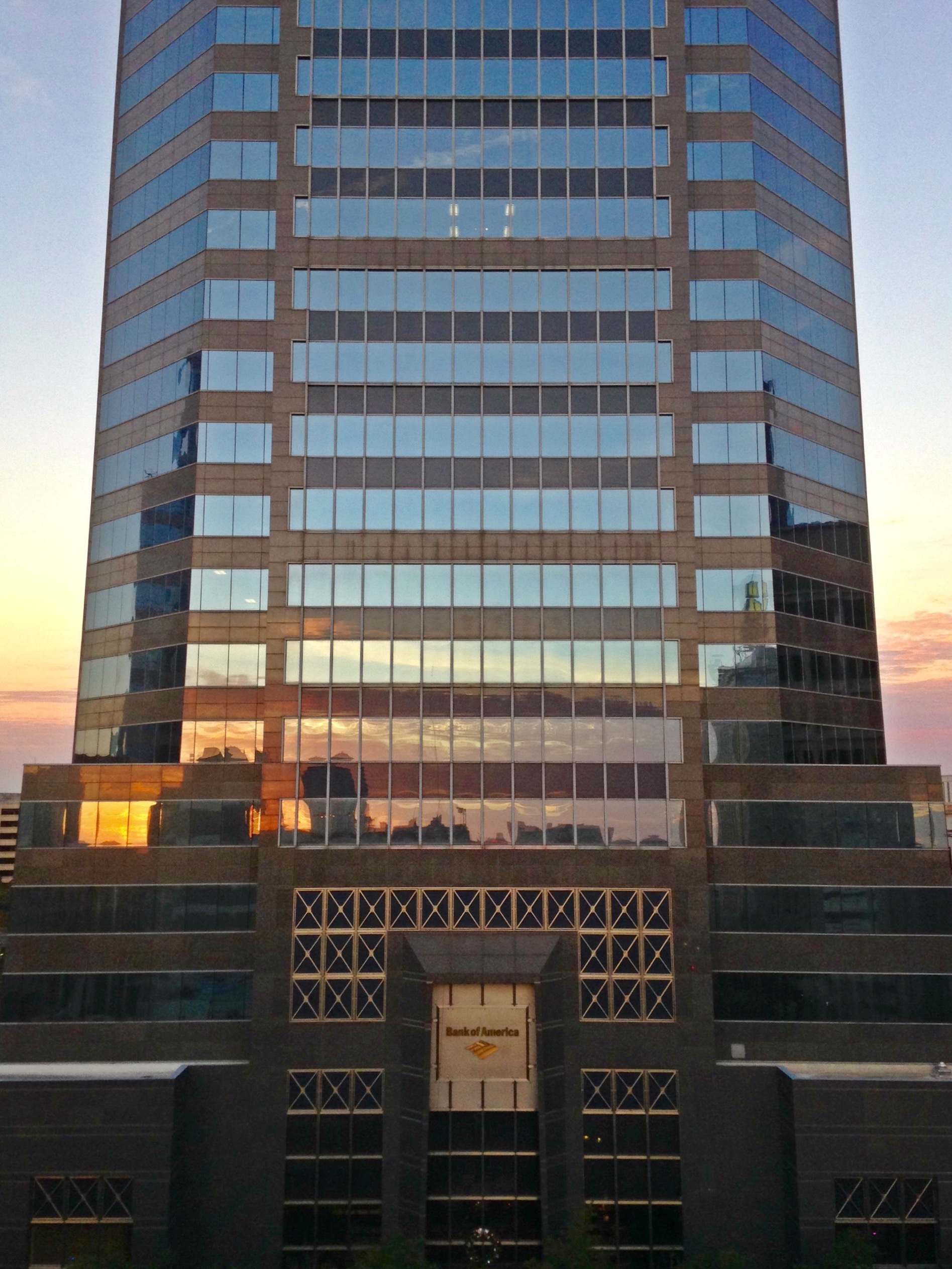
Laura Street entrance of the Bank of America Tower

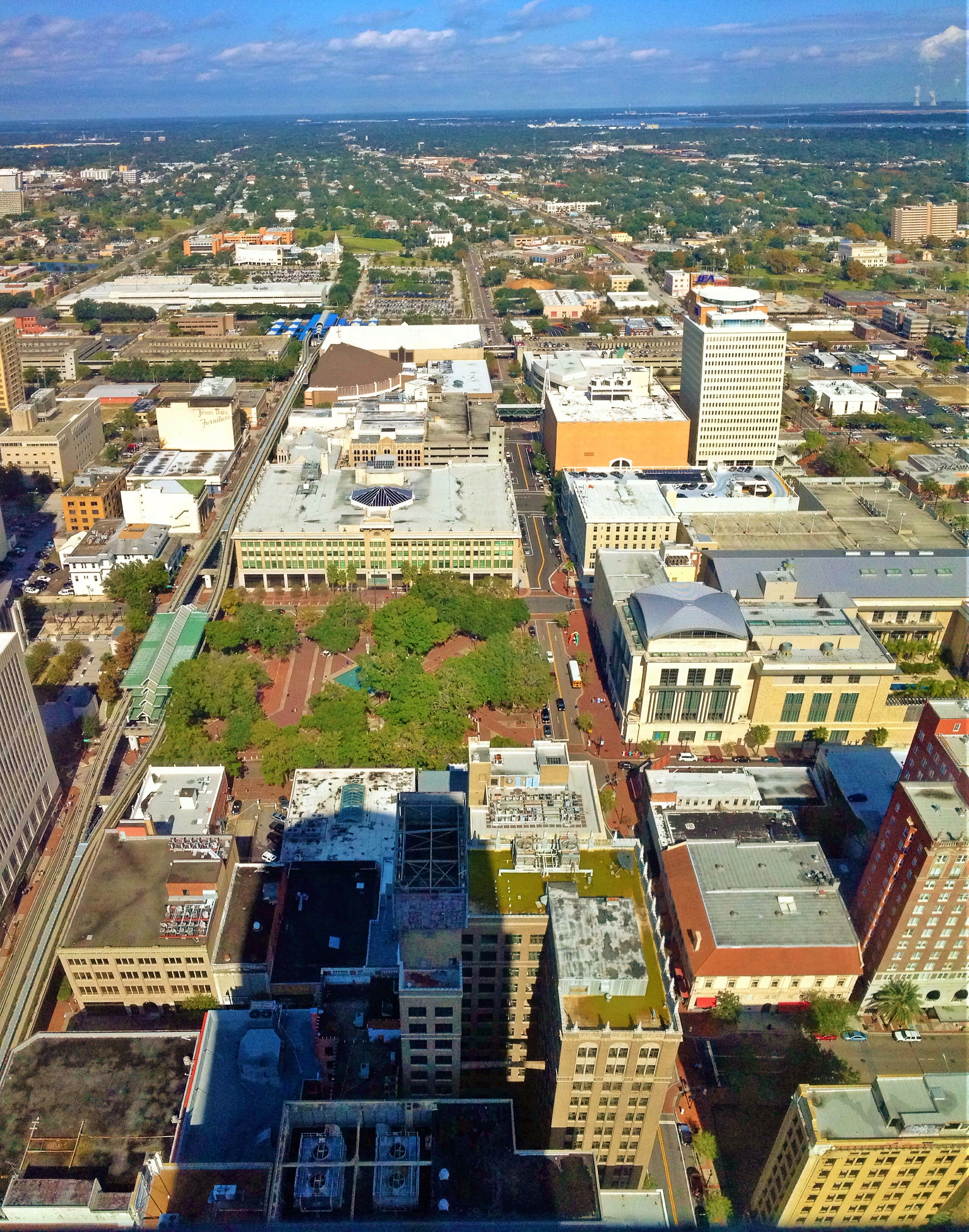
Intersection of Laura and Forsyth Streets

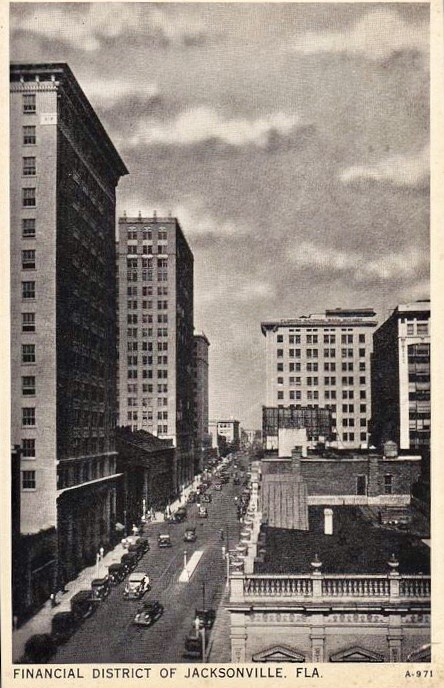
Postcard depicting the Financial District of Jacksonville

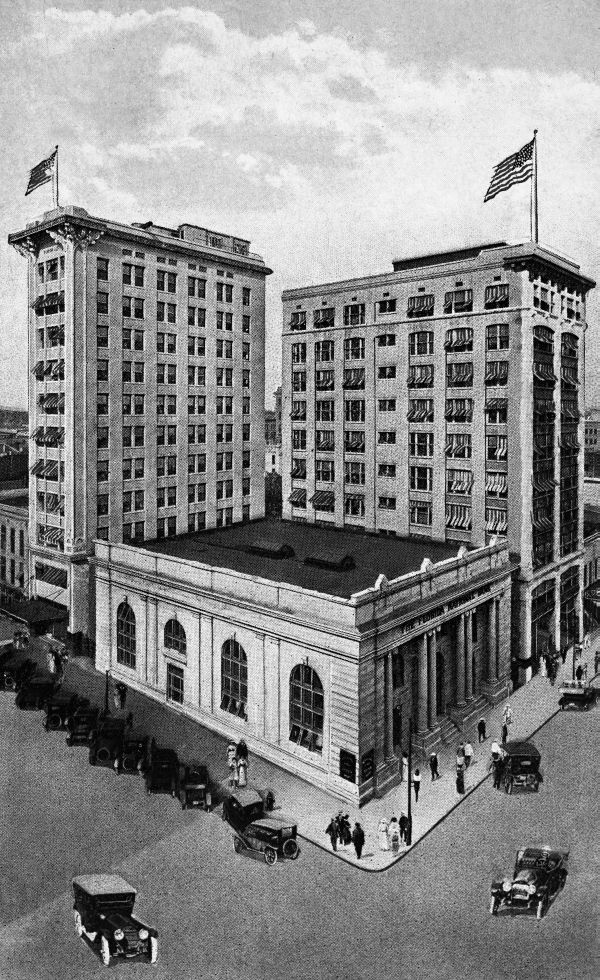
Laura Street Trio in the 1920s

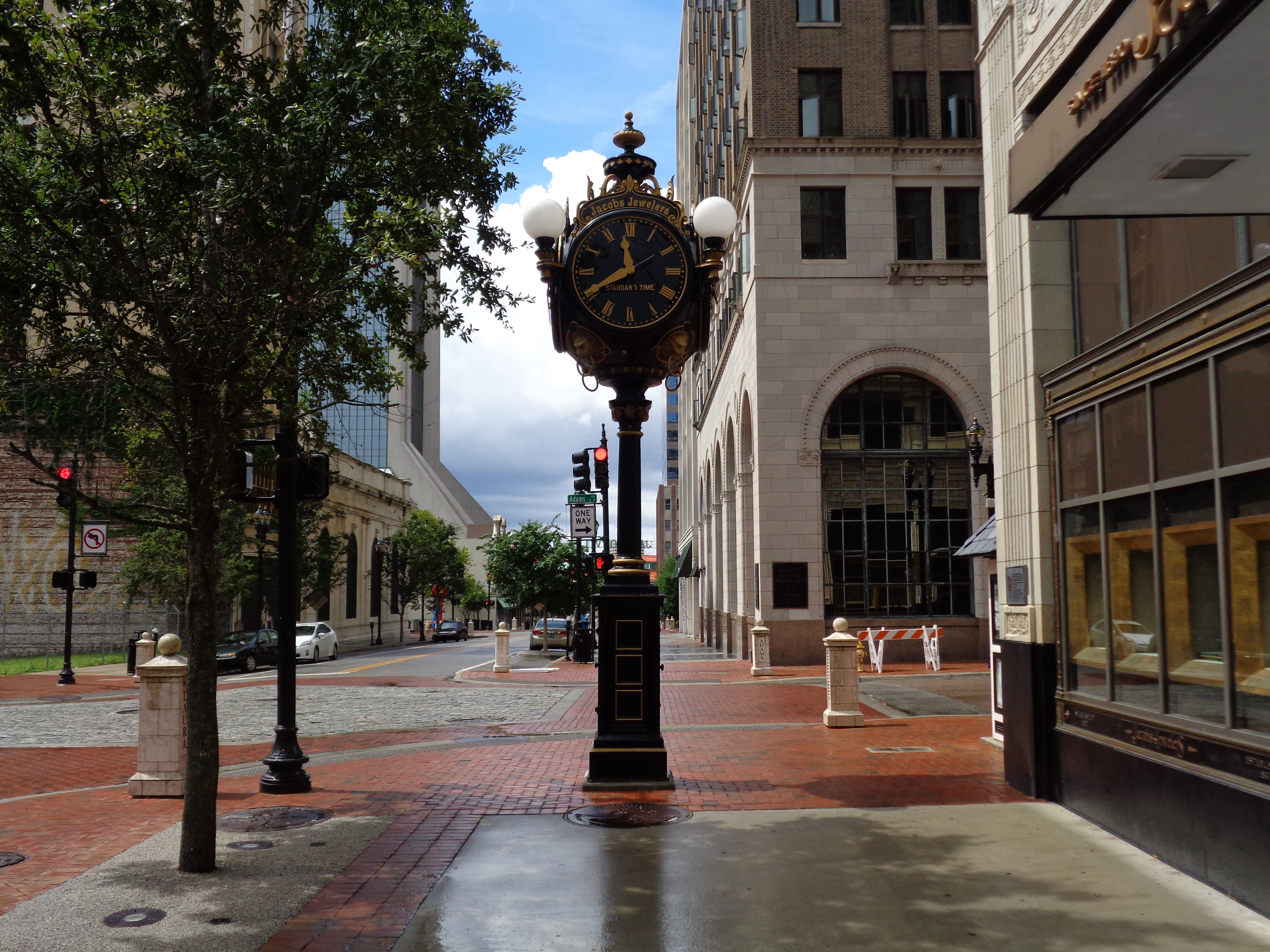
Jacobs Jewelers Clock at the corner of Adams Street

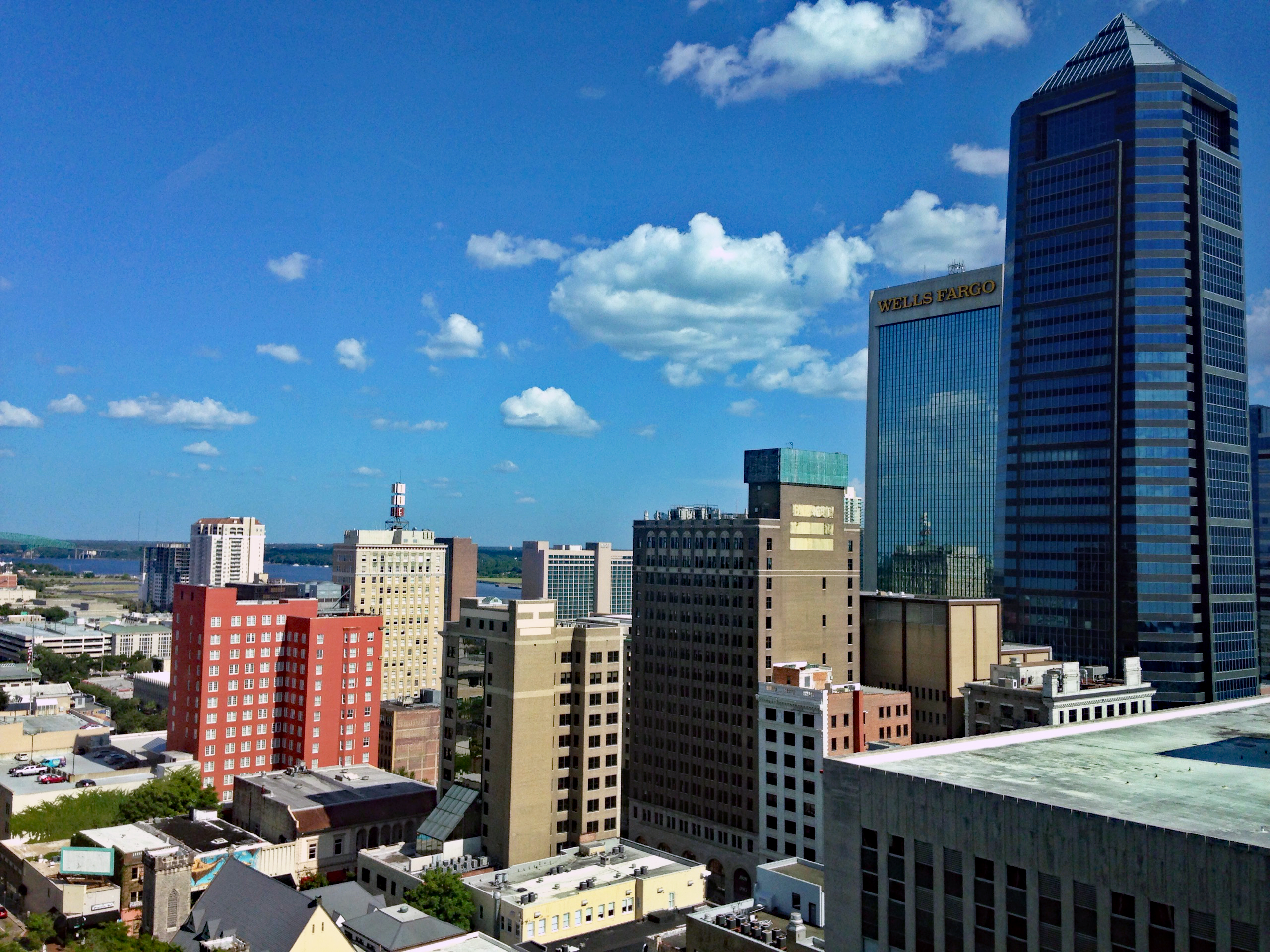
View of the Northbank core from the Federal Courthouse

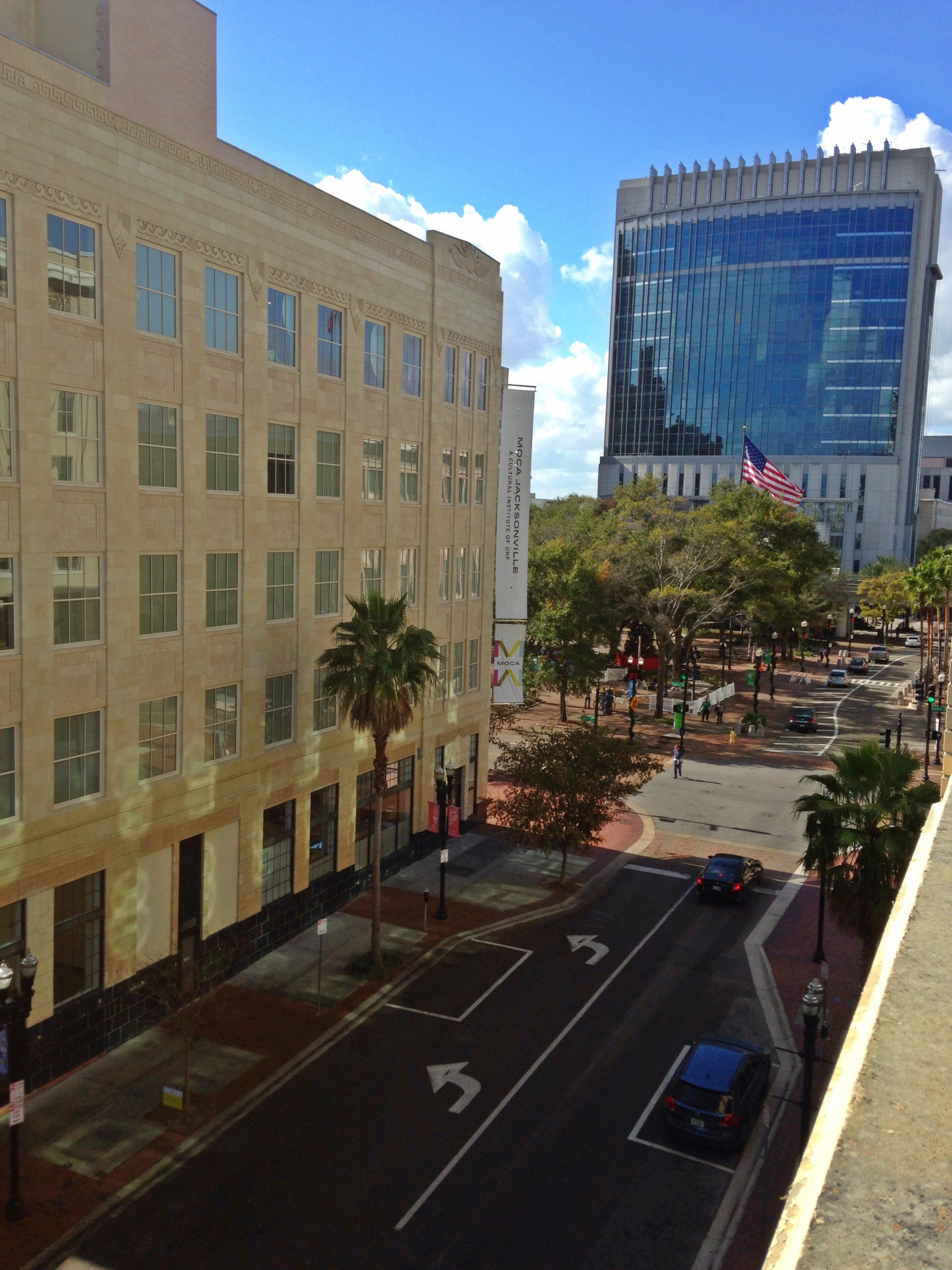
Museum of Contemporary Art Jacksonville

== See also ==
- List of financial districts
- Economy of Jacksonville
- Architecture of Jacksonville
- National Register of Historic Places listings in Duval County, Florida
