= Nickerson Farms =

American roadside restaurant franchise

- Type: Gas station/full-service restaurant
- Industry: Restaurants
- Founded: 1960s
- Headquarters: Eldon, Missouri; Omaha, Nebraska; Independence, Missouri; Arlington Heights, Illinois
- Key people: I. J. Nickerson
- Products: Fuel, full serve restaurant

Nickerson Farms was an American roadside restaurant franchise that existed between the mid-1960s and the early 1980s. It was started by I. J. Nickerson, a former Stuckey's franchisee who did not agree with that chain's rules and regulations. Nickerson Farms had as many as sixty restaurants located along Interstate highways, mainly in the Midwestern United States. Each Nickerson Farms location had a full-room restaurant, with a gift shop. Honey, collected from on-site beehives, could also be purchased at Nickerson Farms stores.

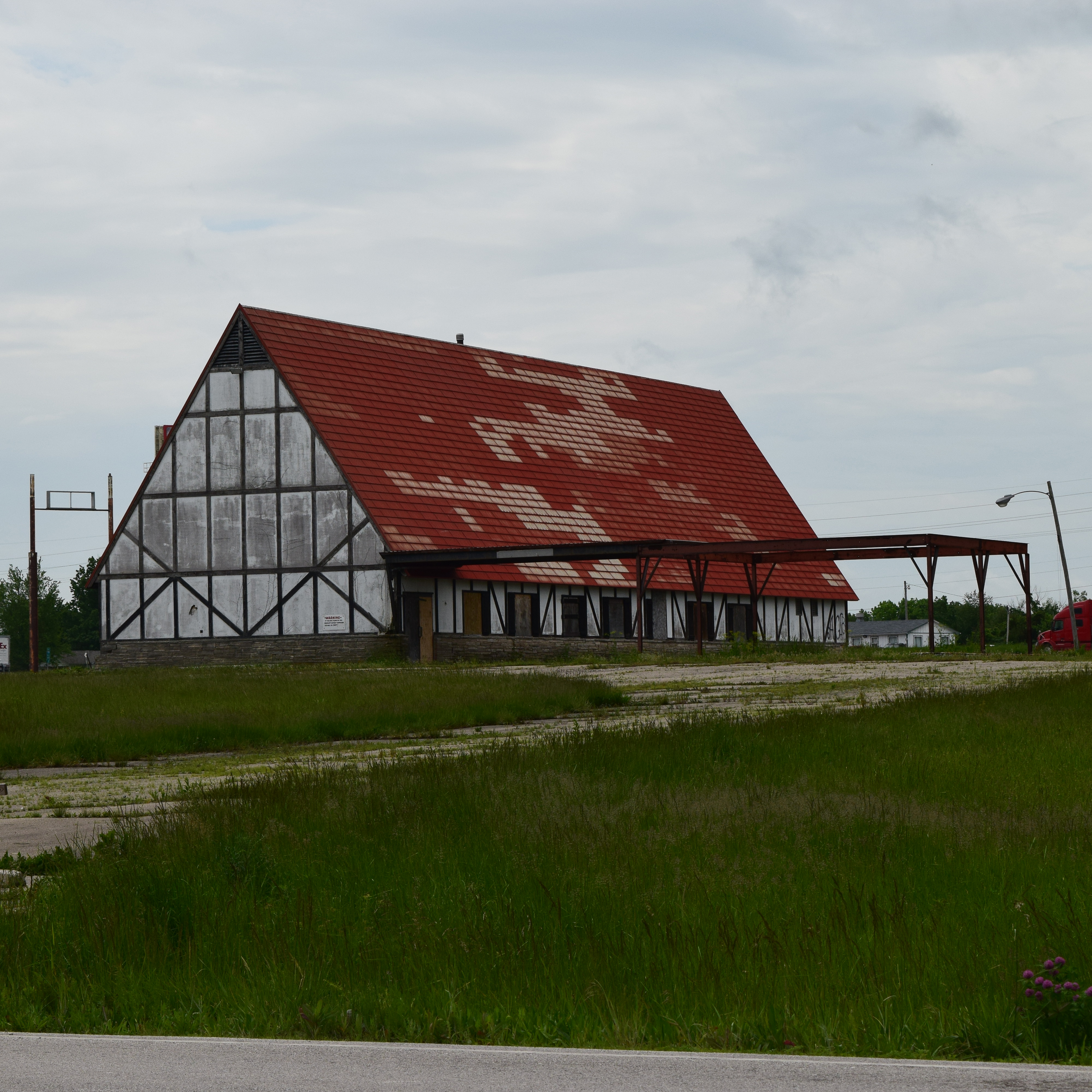
A former location in High Hill, MO.

The majority of Nickerson Farms locations sold Skelly gasoline and other petroleum products.

== See also ==
- Stuckey's
- Horne's
