= Horne's (restaurant) =

Former United States restaurant chain

- Company type: Private
- Industry: Restaurants
- Founded: 1948
- Defunct: 1981
- Fate: Purchased by Greyhound
- Headquarters: Bayard, Florida
- Key people: Robert "Bob" I. Horne
- Products: Cuisine, novelties, fuel
- Number of employees: 35

Horne's was a Southern-style restaurant chain located primarily in the Southeast and Southern United States along major highways. It was headquartered in Bayard, Florida. At the chain's peak there were over 60 Horne's locations, but today only one original restaurant remains. Many restaurant locations featured diner-style sit-down service as well as lodging, Texaco gas stations, gift shops, and an ice cream bar, seeking to create a one-stop shop atmosphere. Since many locations were on highways, many Horne's restaurants were always open.

== History ==
=== Early days ===
Horne's Beauty Rest Cabins

The first Horne's shop

In the early 1930s, Bob Horne and his family owned and operated "Horne's Beauty Rest Cabins", a motel located near Jacksonville, Florida. When Horne was 22, he began working at a Stuckey's in Eastman, Georgia, where he made his own candy for the restaurant. After a few years working there, he decided to create his own restaurant and candy shop. On October 4, 1948, Bob Horne founded his first store, located a short distance from the Beauty Rest Cabin. The original concept was to have the stores along major highways and sell candies, nuts, and souvenirs to travelers. Bob Horne's father Alton Irving Horne became secretary of the company. In 1950, "Horne's Enterprises" began a $2 million expansion plan after selling 235,000 shares of common stock of the company. The expansion also saw the addition of a 25-seat counter grill to many of the restaurants. The grills would later be known as "Circus Grills" because of their circus-inspired theme.

As he expanded the chain, Horne started to include other amenities to attract tourists along the highway. He later added motels to many of the restaurants to create "Horne's Motor Lodge and Restaurant." On May 7, 1953, the company was incorporated in Florida as "Horne's of Bayard, Inc.". By 1956, 8 years after being founded, the chain had expanded to 17 locations in eight states. Horne also began having his restaurants' roofs painted bright yellow to attract customers, and erecting tall signs outside the restaurants to be seen from the highway. In 1963, over 1,250 signs had been built along the highway to advertise Horne's. By the time Horne was 30, he was a millionaire. By 1963 Horne's had 44 units mostly along the eastern seaboard. During the same year, Horne's sales rose to $9.2 million, an increase from $5.7 million during the previous year.

=== Purchase by Greyhound ===
In 1964, The Greyhound Corporation purchased nearly all the chain's stock from Bob Horne for $14,000,000. Harold L. Lumpkins, controller of much of Horne's stock, said, "This is primary to enable Horne's to expand at a more rapid rate. Greyhound has all the money they need and are looking for diversification and we are looking for expansion." When Horne sold his company, he had 55 restaurants in 15 states. After the purchase by Greyhound, John W. Teets became president of the enterprise. Several years after selling the restaurant chain, Horne would later go on to develop Powder Horn Mountain in Watauga County, North Carolina with his wife, Penny. Greyhound placed Horne's under the Greyhound Food Management, Inc. subsidiary. In 1965 there were 60 Horne's restaurants and six motor lodges. In 1965, Horne's along with "Post House Restaurants", another subsidiary of Greyhound, were serving 275 million meals a year.

After only a few years of ownership, on April 30, 1969, Greyhound sold Horne's to Formco, who owned the "Stand N' Snack" chain. When Stand N' Snack acquired Horne's from Greyhound, the company had 19 franchised motor lodges. After the purchase, the headquarters of Horne's was moved to Topeka, Kansas, but it continued to operate as a separate entity from "Stand N' Snack".

In 1967 the original "Horne's Beauty Rest Cabin" closed, but later reopened as "Bayard Antique Village", which remains open today. In the late 1960s, Horne's expanded into Canada, where three branches were built.

=== Decline ===
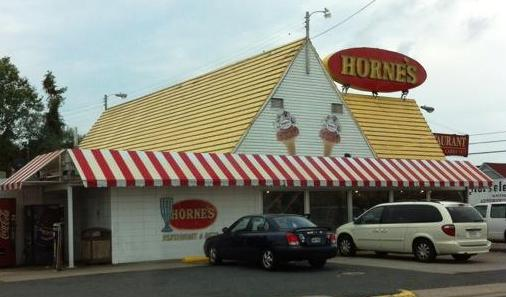
Horne's restaurant in Port Royal, VA

By the late 1970s, highway travel became less profitable for the chain and it began to lose business. On April 29, 1980, Key Energy Enterprises acquired six Horne's locations in Florida. In 1981, the Atlantic National Bank took over "Horne's International Inc.", ending the Horne's chain. In 1982, the last company-owned restaurant closed. By 1986, the trademark on "Horne's Motor Lodge Restaurant" had expired.

=== Today ===
As of April 2024, the company operates 1 location in Virginia. The Port Royal, Virginia Horne's which still features almost all of the original designs and look of the restaurant is the last remaining restaurant of the former chain. It also serves as a tourist destination for travelers and families stationed at Fort A.P. Hill. This location was built in 1960 and still features the original equipment used for making the milkshakes. In Florence, South Carolina, a former Horne's still bearing the name but with no connection to the original restaurant remained open until 2013. None of the Horne's Motor Lodges remain open today. The last motel to close its doors, in Ocala, Florida, was demolished in early December 2014.

== Menu ==
Horne's sold a variety of meals, including the "Circus Burger" which was a hamburger with coleslaw. Another popular item was the fried chicken. Horne's also served charbroiled hamburgers, steak, home-baked pecan pies, and all day breakfast. The candies sold included pecan rolls, pralines, forty-two varieties of kettle candies, and various chocolates.

== Slogans ==
"Your Highway Host for Food and Candies"
"Your High Host for One Stop Service"
"Look for the Yellow Roof"
"The Happy Stop Along the Highway"
