= Hutchinson–Suddath Building =

- U.S. National Register of Historic Places
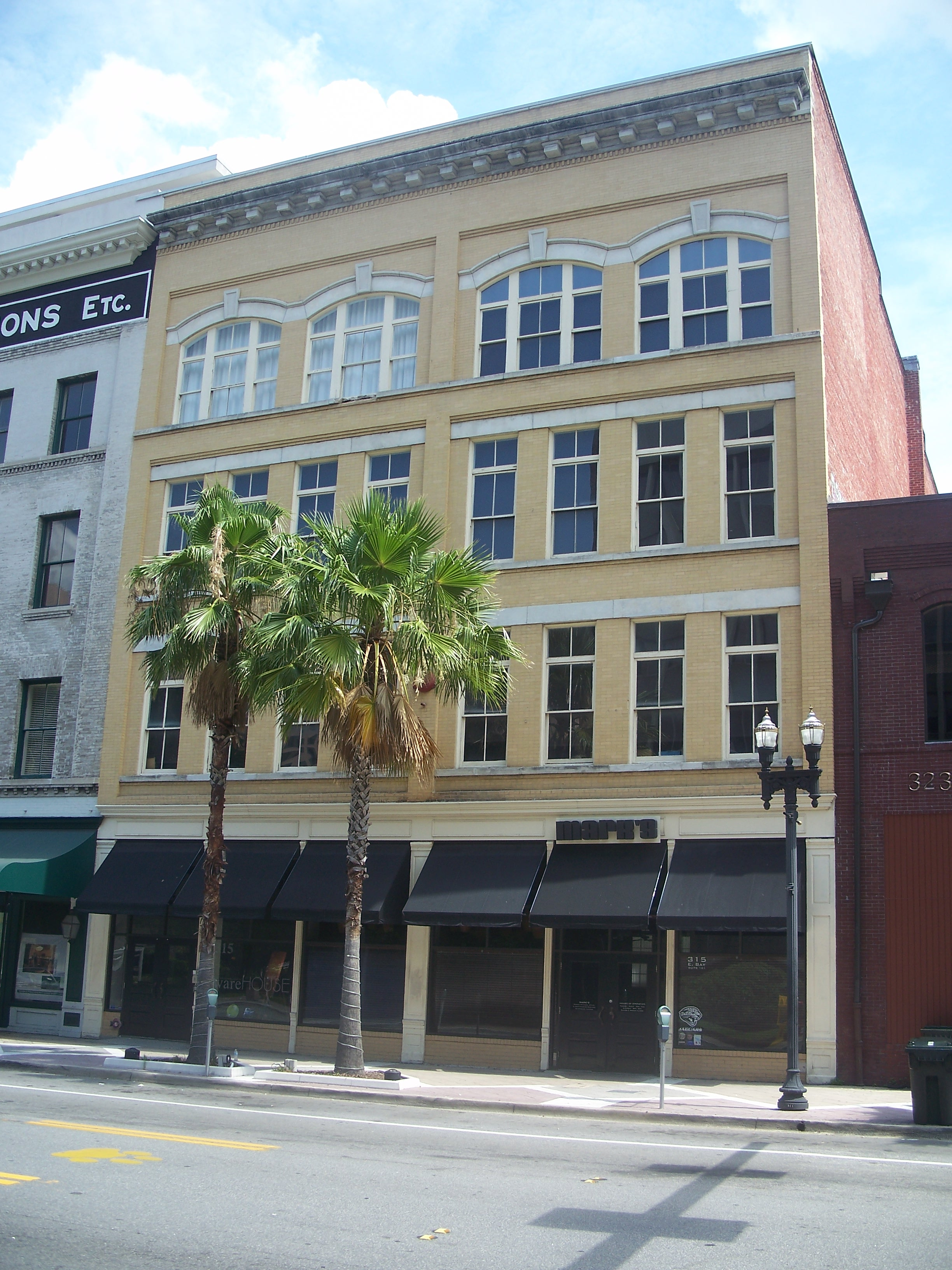

- Location within Florida Location within the United States
- Location: Jacksonville, Florida
- Coordinates: 30°19′34″N 81°39′30″W
- Area: less than one acre
- MPS: Downtown Jacksonville MPS
- NRHP reference No.: 07001029
- Added to NRHP: October 3, 2007

The Hutchinson–Suddath Building is a historic building at 315-319 East Bay Street in Jacksonville, Florida, United States. On October 3, 2007, it was added to the U.S. National Register of Historic Places.

This property is part of the Downtown Jacksonville Multiple Property Submission, a Multiple Property Submission to the National Register.

== History ==
The Hutchison-Suddath Building was built in 1910 for the Hutchinson Shoe Company, which occupied the building until 1931, when it was bought by Suddath. In 1936, the building also held the Cable Piano Company.
