= Laura Street Trio =

Group of historic buildings in Jacksonville, Florida

Coordinates: 30.327637°N 81.658869°W

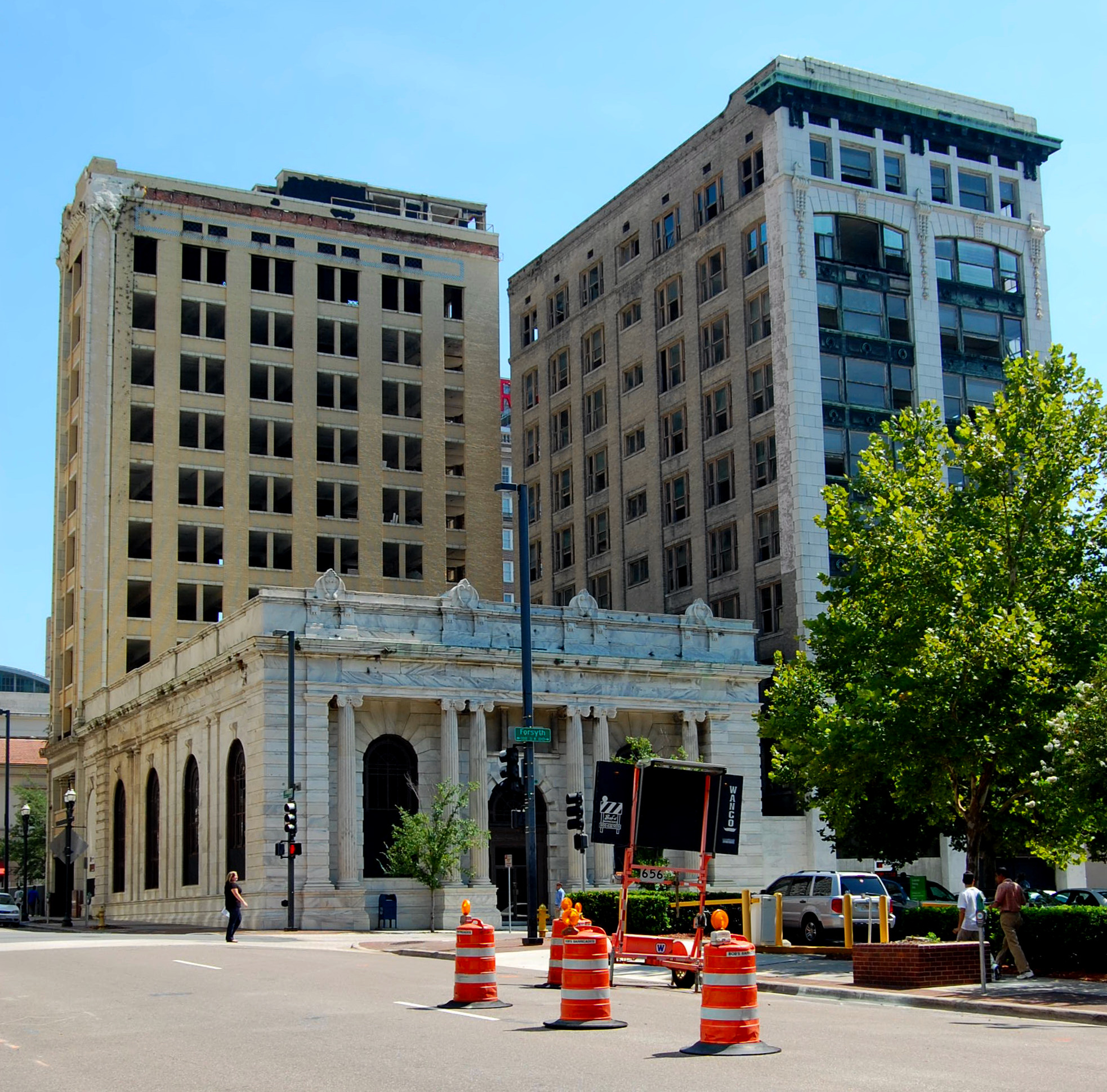
The Laura Street Trio: the Florida Life Building (left), the Marble Bank (foreground), and the Bisbee Building (right)

The Laura Street Trio is a group of three historic buildings located on and near Laura Street in downtown Jacksonville, Florida. The Trio consists of two perpendicularly arranged skyscrapers, the Florida Life Building and the Bisbee Building, plus a third structure, the Old Florida National Bank (or Marble Bank), which is framed by the other two in a unique pattern. The three buildings, constructed in the wake of the Great Fire of 1901, are architecturally significant, but are currently endangered.

== Structures ==
=== Old Florida National Bank ===
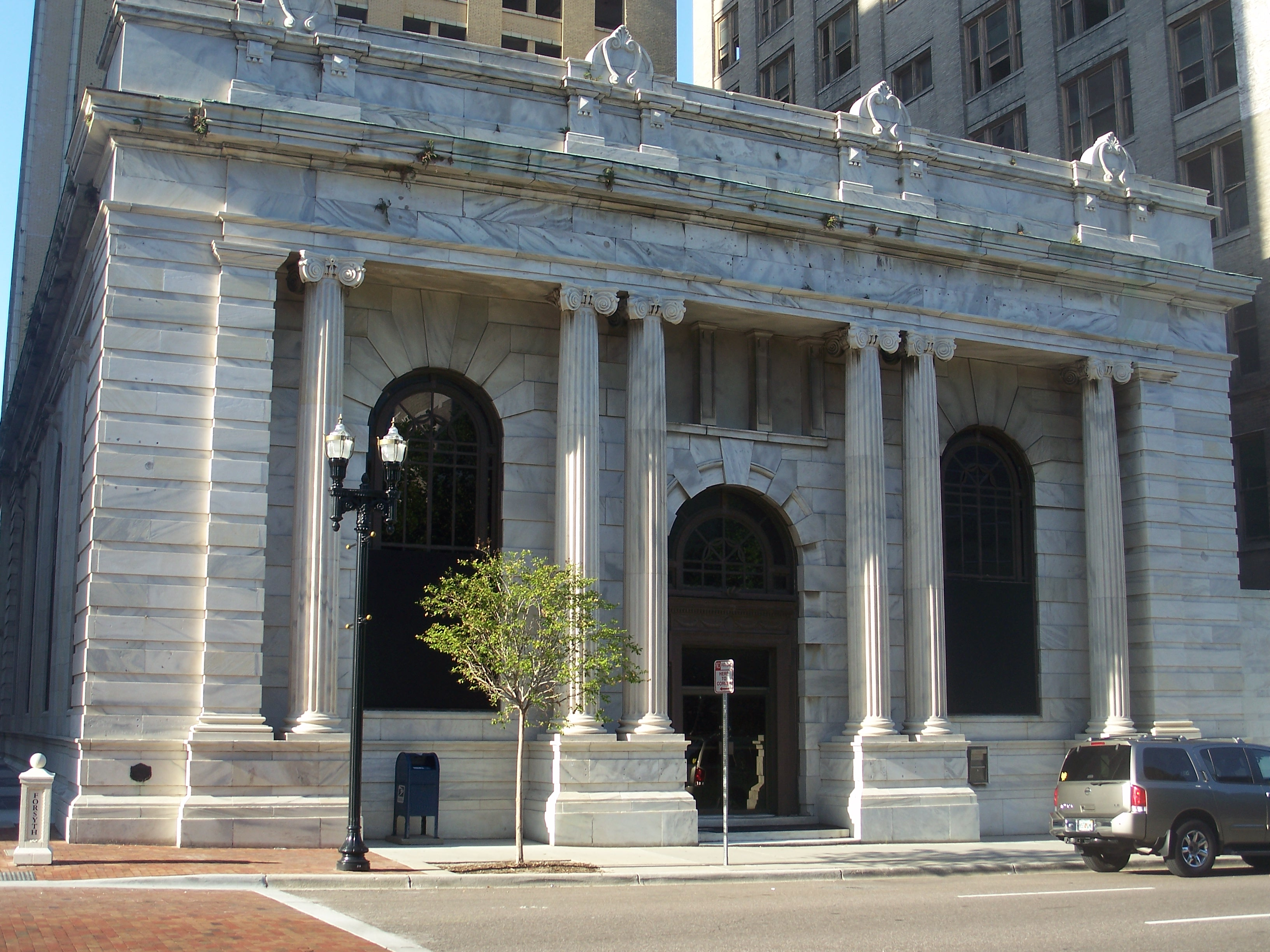
The Old Florida National Bank, also known as the Marble Bank

The oldest of the three, the Old Florida National Bank, also known as the Marble Bank, sits on the corner of Forsyth and Laura Streets. It was originally built as the Mercantile Exchange Bank in 1902, just after the Great Fire of 1901 had destroyed nearly all of downtown Jacksonville. Architect Edward H. Glidden designed it in the Classical Revival style. In 1905 it was bought by Florida Bank & Trust, predecessors to the modern Florida National Bank, who renovated and expanded it. It was renovated again in 1916 to include a large banking room with a skylight, plaster detailing, and a coffered ceiling. Another refurbishing in the 1950s added dropped ceilings that covered the skylight and detail work; these were removed in 1976 by the building's then owners, the Jacksonville National Bank, who undertook a substantial restoration to its original appearance.

By the 1990s, however, the building had been sold, and its subsequent owners allowed it to deteriorate dramatically.

=== Bisbee Building ===
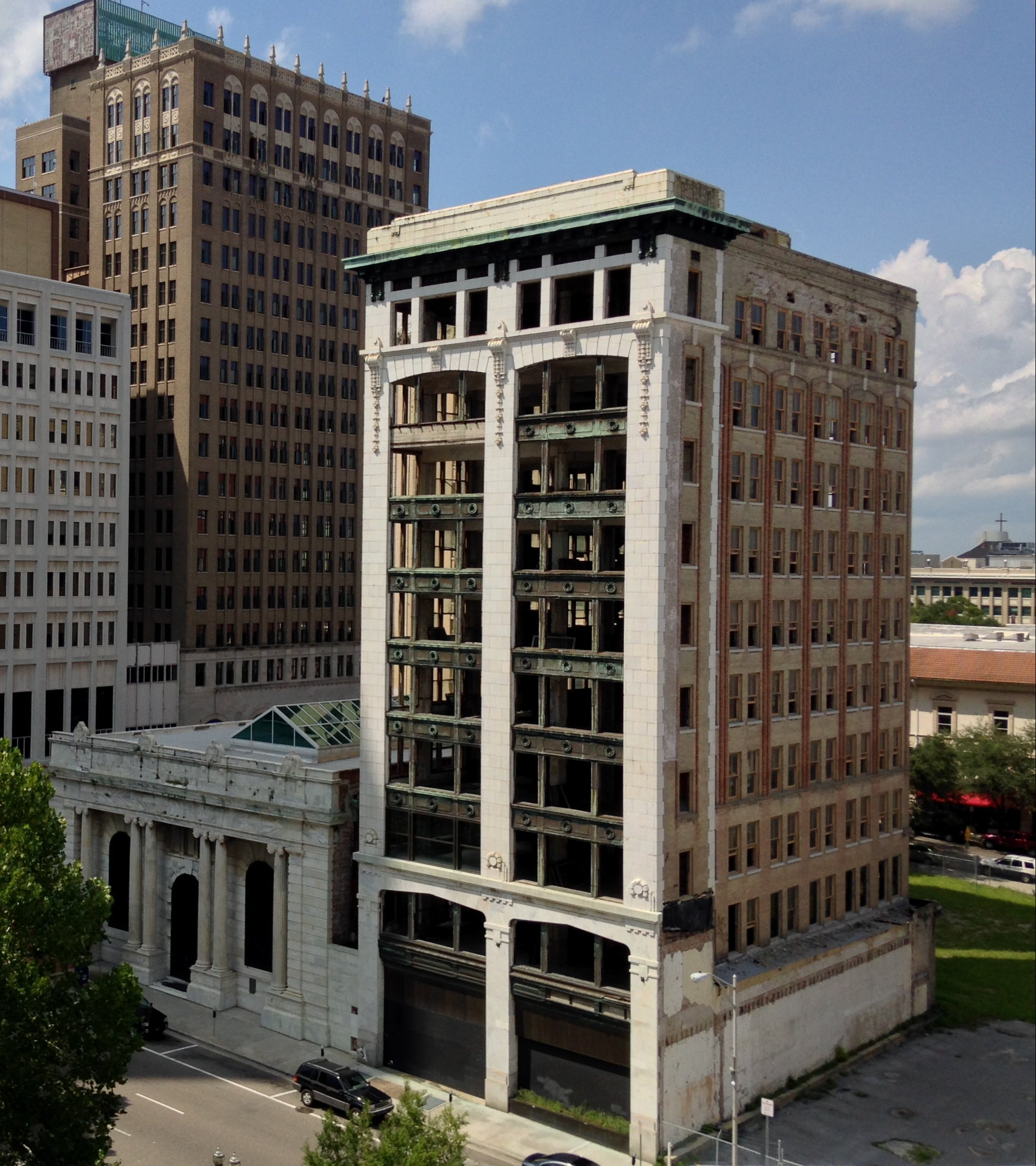
The Bisbee Building

The second of the three buildings to be built, the Bisbee Building was constructed between 1908 and 1909, adjacent to the Marble Bank on Forsyth Street. It was designed by prominent Jacksonville architect Henry J. Klutho in a Chicago School-influenced Prairie Style. It was constructed amid a race against two other ten-story projects, 121 Atlantic Place and the Seminole Hotel, to build Jacksonville's first ever skyscraper. The Bisbee won the race, but 121 Atlantic Place was slightly taller, making it Florida's tallest building at the time. The Bisbee Building was the first reinforced concrete highrise anywhere in the Southern United States, and was originally designed to be only 26 feet wide, about half its present width, but demand for office space in the trendy new edifice led the owner to have Klutho add on.

As with the other buildings, the Bisbee Building was eventually left empty and rapidly deteriorated.

=== Florida Life Building ===
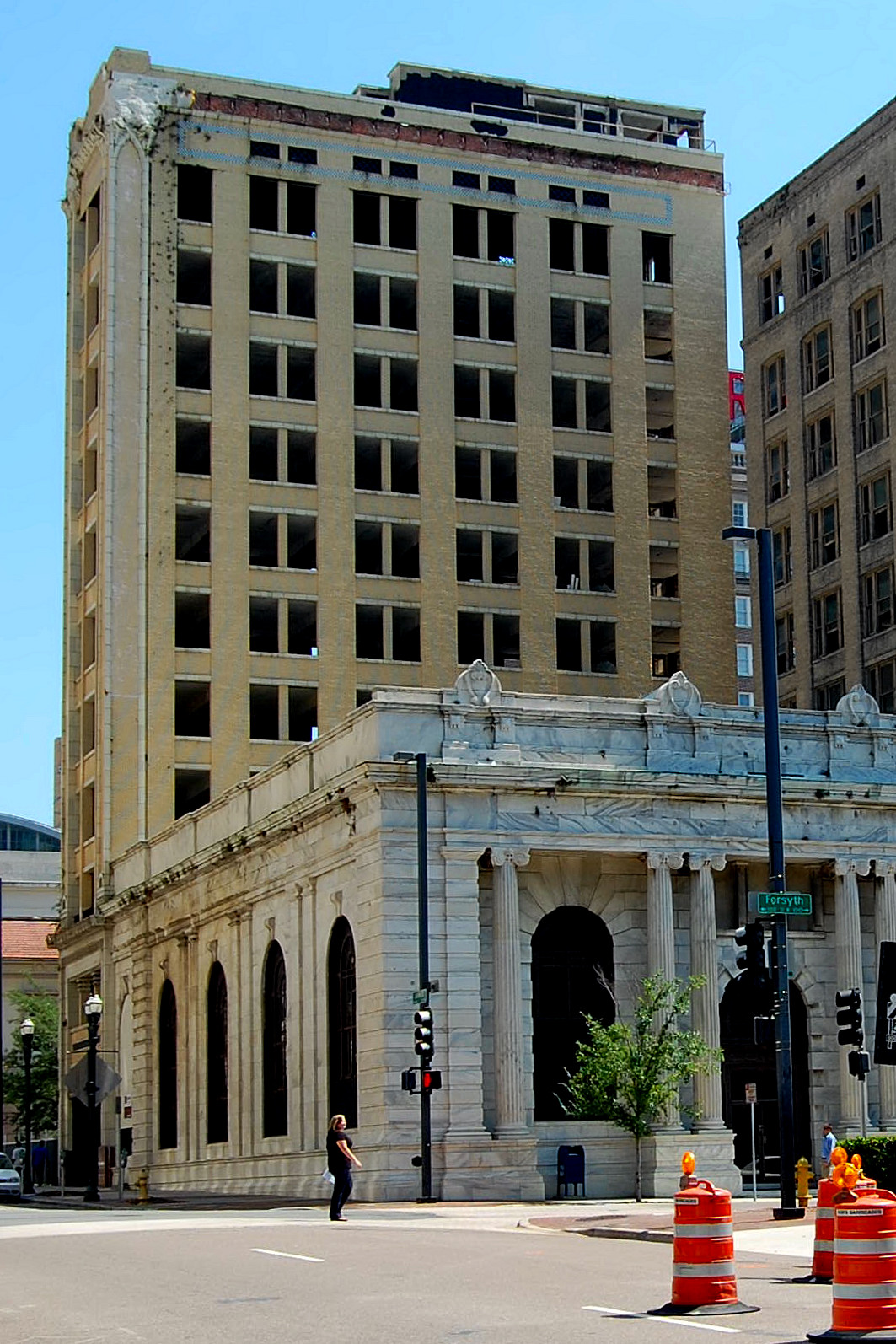
The Florida Life Building (background)

The Florida Life Building was also designed by Klutho, between 1911 and 1912. It stands next to the Marble Bank's back wall, and is the only one of the Trio that actually faces Laura Street. It was constructed at the same time as Klutho's St. James Building (now Jacksonville City Hall). Standing 45 meters and 11 floors high, it was Jacksonville's – and Florida's – tallest building when it was built, though it was superseded less than a year later by the Heard National Bank Building. Still, Wayne Wood of the Jacksonville Historic Landmarks Commission writes that with its narrow and well-proportioned tower, the building "was and perhaps still is Jacksonville's purest statement of a 'skyscraper.'" Like the Bisbee Buildings, it is an example of Klutho's Chicago-influenced Prairie Style. On April 18, 2012, the AIA's Florida Chapter placed the Florida Life Building on its list of Florida Architecture: 100 Years. 100 Places.

The building was constructed for the Florida Life Insurance Company, but the firm folded in 1915, and the structure changed hands a number of times over the years. In 1994, its then owners, Nations Bank, removed the original capitals on the top floor, doing structural damage in the process. Like the other buildings, the Florida Life building fell into disrepair.

== Restoration plans ==
In the 2000s the Laura Street Trio were recognized as some of Jacksonville's most significant – and endangered – historic buildings. In 2002, under Mayor John Delaney, the City of Jacksonville purchased all three buildings to transfer them to a developer who could restore them. Orlando developer Cameron Kuhn purchased the Laura Street Trio, as well as the nearby Barnett National Bank Building, but went bankrupt in the 2008 housing market crash before restoring them. The project subsequently sat idle. In 2010 Jacksonville investment group Atkins Group, together with the Tallahassee-based Capital City Partners, presented a new, $70 million plan to restore the Laura Street Trio and the Barnett National Bank Building, as well as construct a fifth building. In June 2011 Atkins Group requested $5 million in historic tax credits to move forward with Phase I of the project. The Trio was slated to being renovated into a Courtyard Marriot Hotel. However, this plan failed and the city is now foreclosing on the property.

== Gallery ==
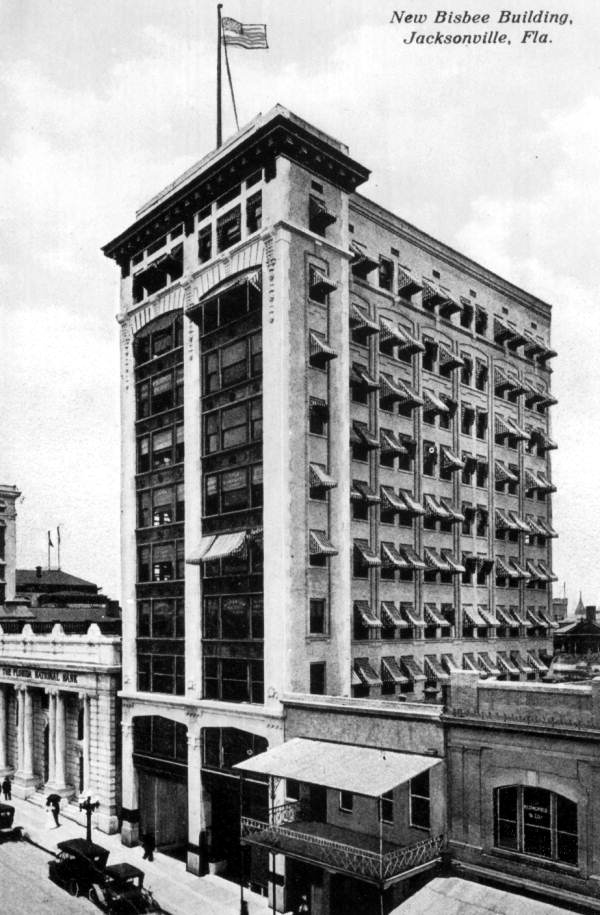
Bisbee building in 1910s

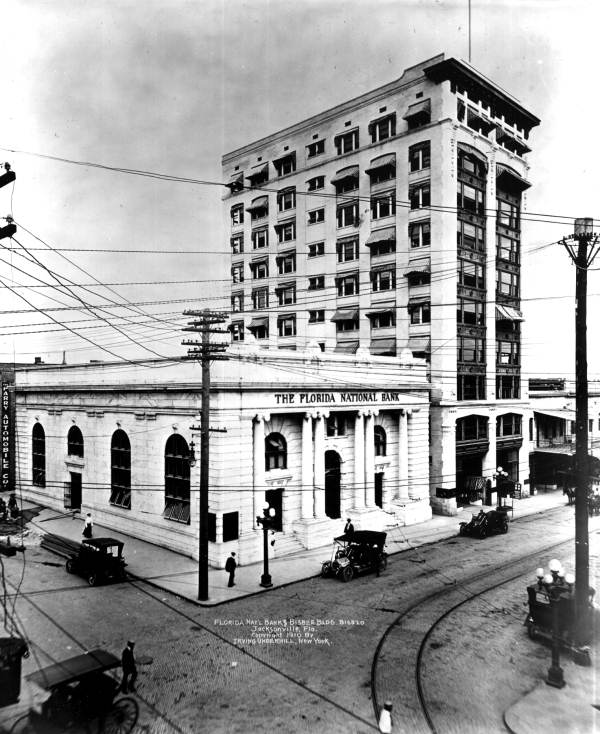
Florida National Bank and Bisbee Building in 1910.

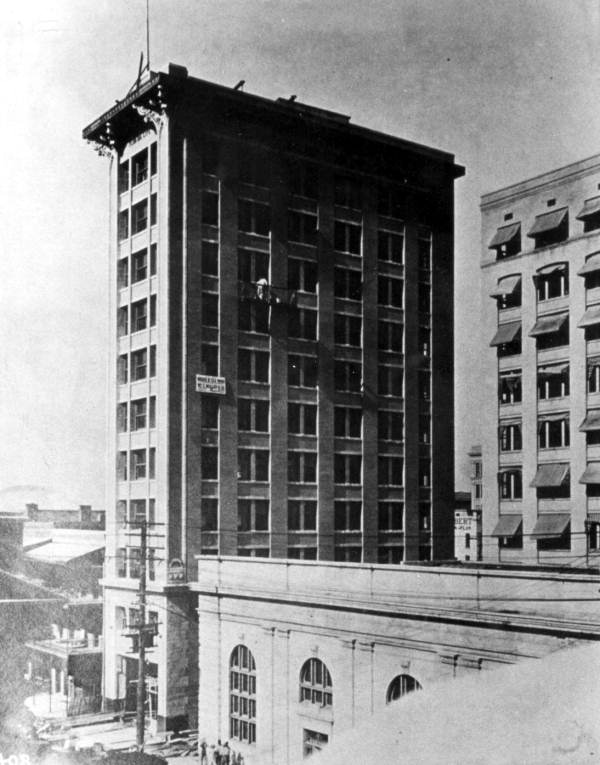
Florida Life building under construction in 1911

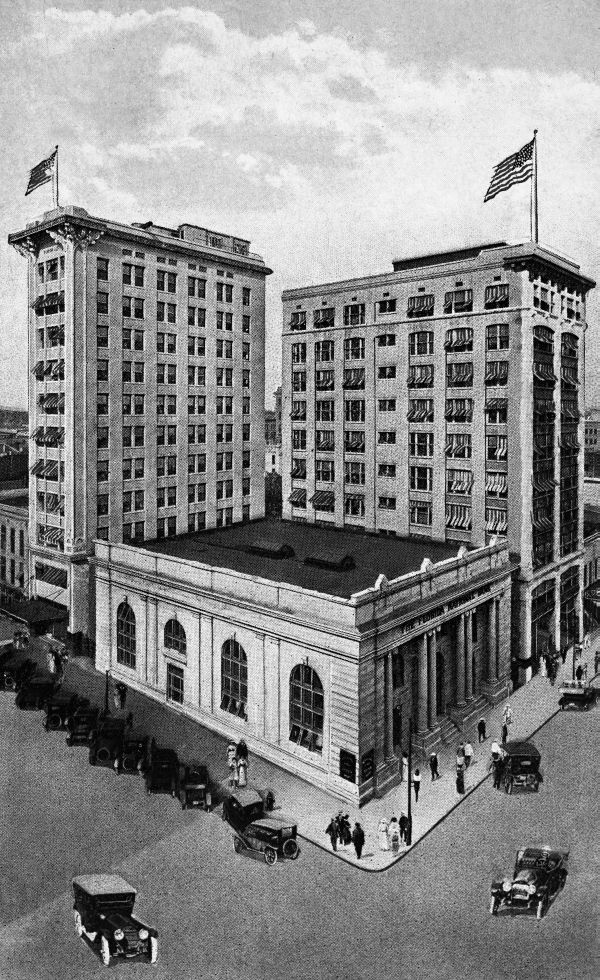
Laura Street Trio around 1920.

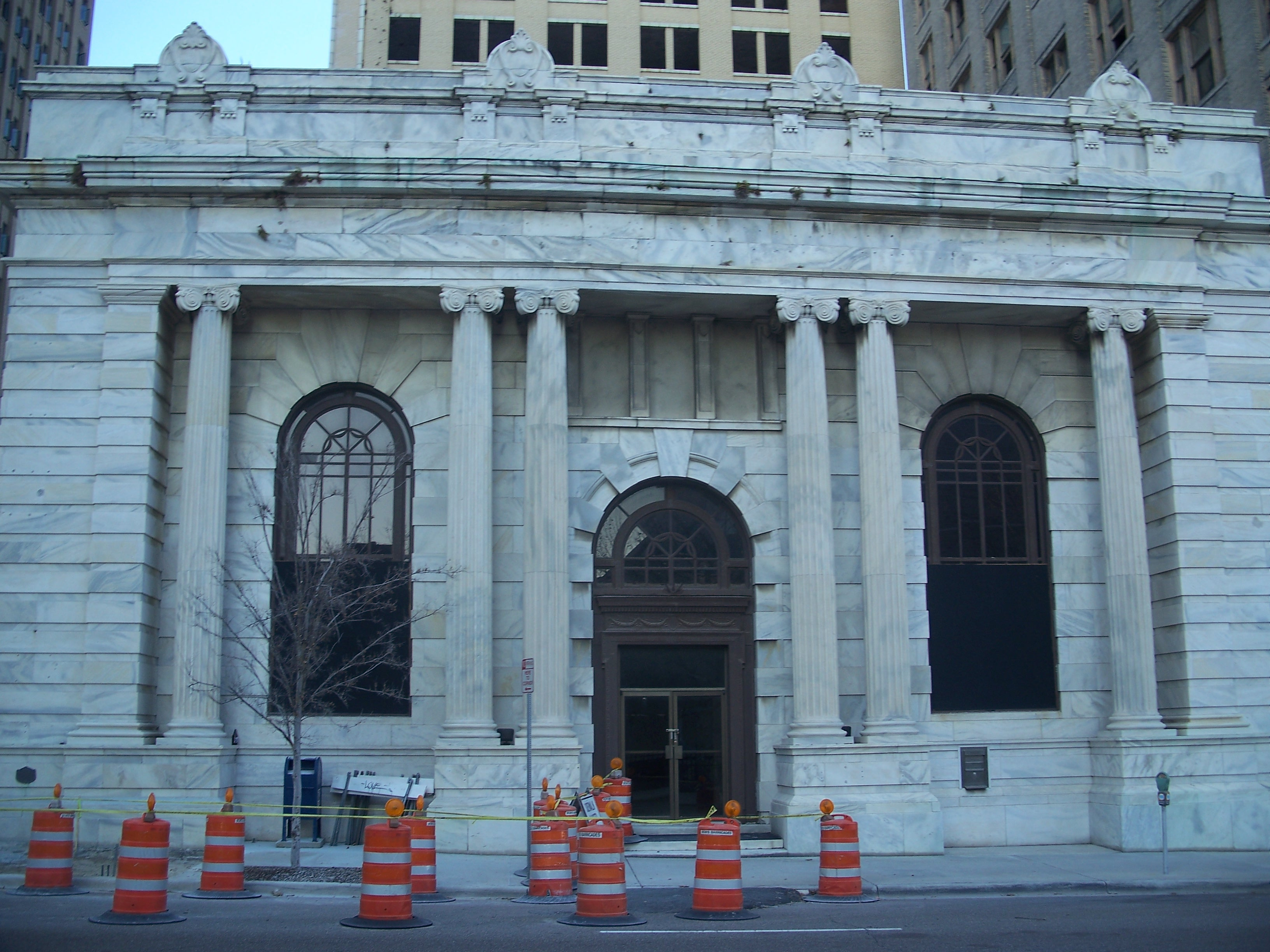
Florida National Bank in 2011

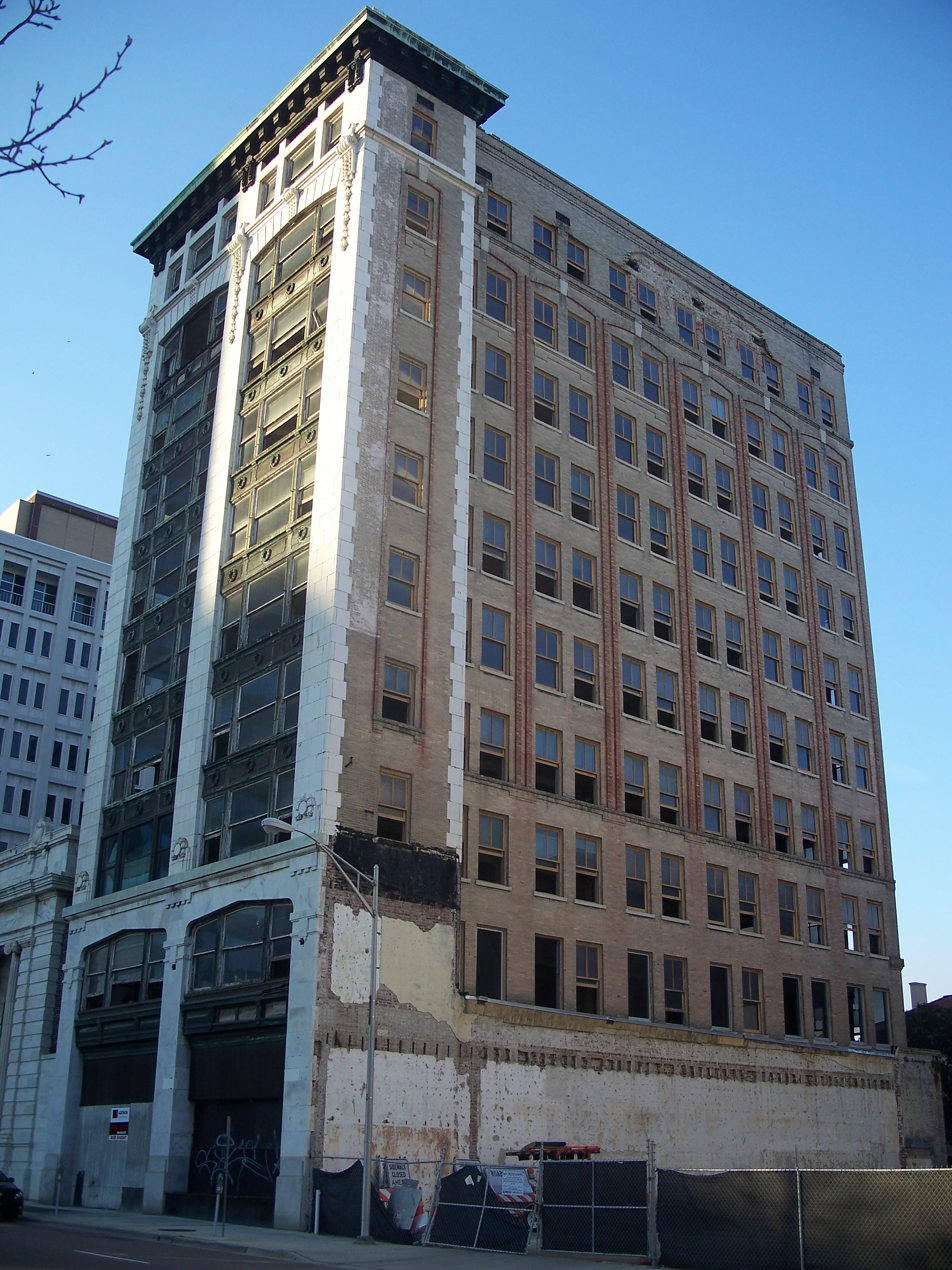
Ruins of the Bisbee building in 2011

== See also ==
- Architecture of Jacksonville

== Notes ==
Records
| Preceded by 121 Atlantic Place | Tallest building in Jacksonville; 1912–1913; 45m | Succeeded by Heard National Bank Building |
| Preceded by 121 Atlantic Place | Tallest building in Florida; 1912–1913; 45m | Succeeded by Heard National Bank Building |
