= Pecan log roll =

Type of American confectionery

- Type: Confectionery
- Main ingredients: Nougat, caramel, pecans

A pecan log roll is a confectionery popularized by the roadside convenience store Stuckey's.

Pecan log rolls are described by the company's website as "fluffy, cherry-laced nougat wrapped in fresh caramel and pecans."
