= Stuckey's =

Chain of gas stations in the United States

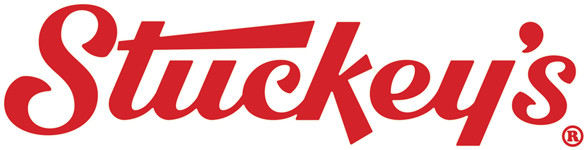

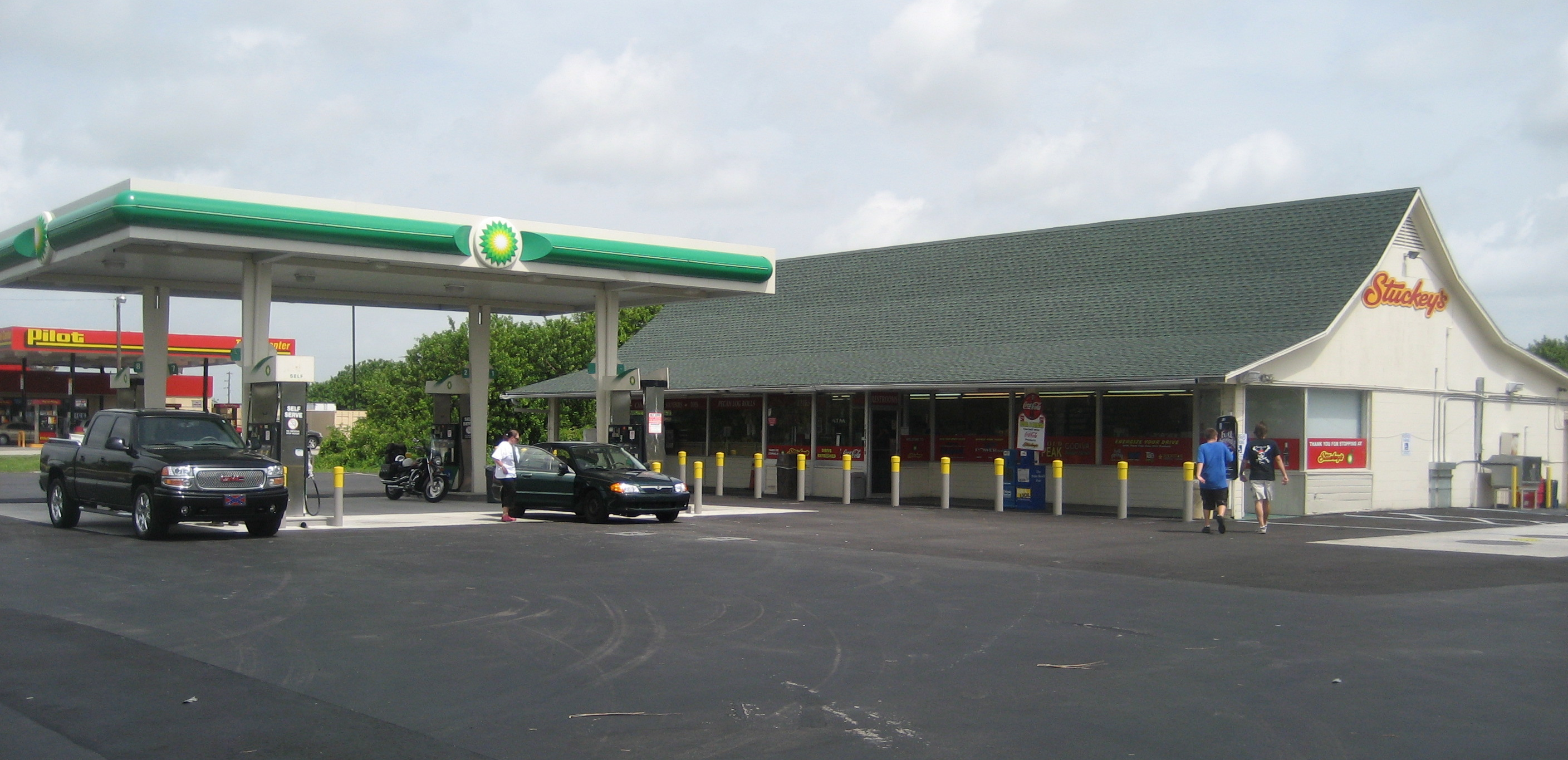
- Type: Private
- Industry: Truck stops
- Founded: 1937; 89 years ago
- Headquarters: Eastman, Georgia, US
- Key people: Founder, W. S. Stuckey Sr.; Chairman, W. S. Stuckey Jr.; CEO, Stephanie Stuckey
- Products: Candy, novelties, food, fuel
- Website: stuckeys.com

Stuckey's is an American convenience store in the Southeast, Southwest, and Midwestern United States. It is known for its pecan log rolls and kitschy souvenirs. Stuckey's sells candy, apparel, souvenirs, and other products online.

Stuckey's Corporation is headquartered in Eastman, Georgia, and in 2021, purchased a pecan processing and candy making plant in Wrens, Georgia. The current CEO of Stuckey's is Stephanie Stuckey, granddaughter of the brand's founder W.S. Stuckey Sr.

== History ==
=== Early days ===
In the 1930s, having borrowed $35 from his grandmother and a car from a friend, W.S. Stuckey Sr., drove around the Eastman, Georgia, countryside buying pecans from local farmers and selling them to pecan processors. Stuckey made over $4,500 his first year in the pecan business; by 1937, Stuckey was selling over $150,000 worth of pecans a year that he purchased and sold to local processors. The same year, he opened a roadside stand along Highway 23 in Eastman selling pecans, sugar cane juice, syrup, homemade quilts, and "all you can drink for five-cents" cherry cider.

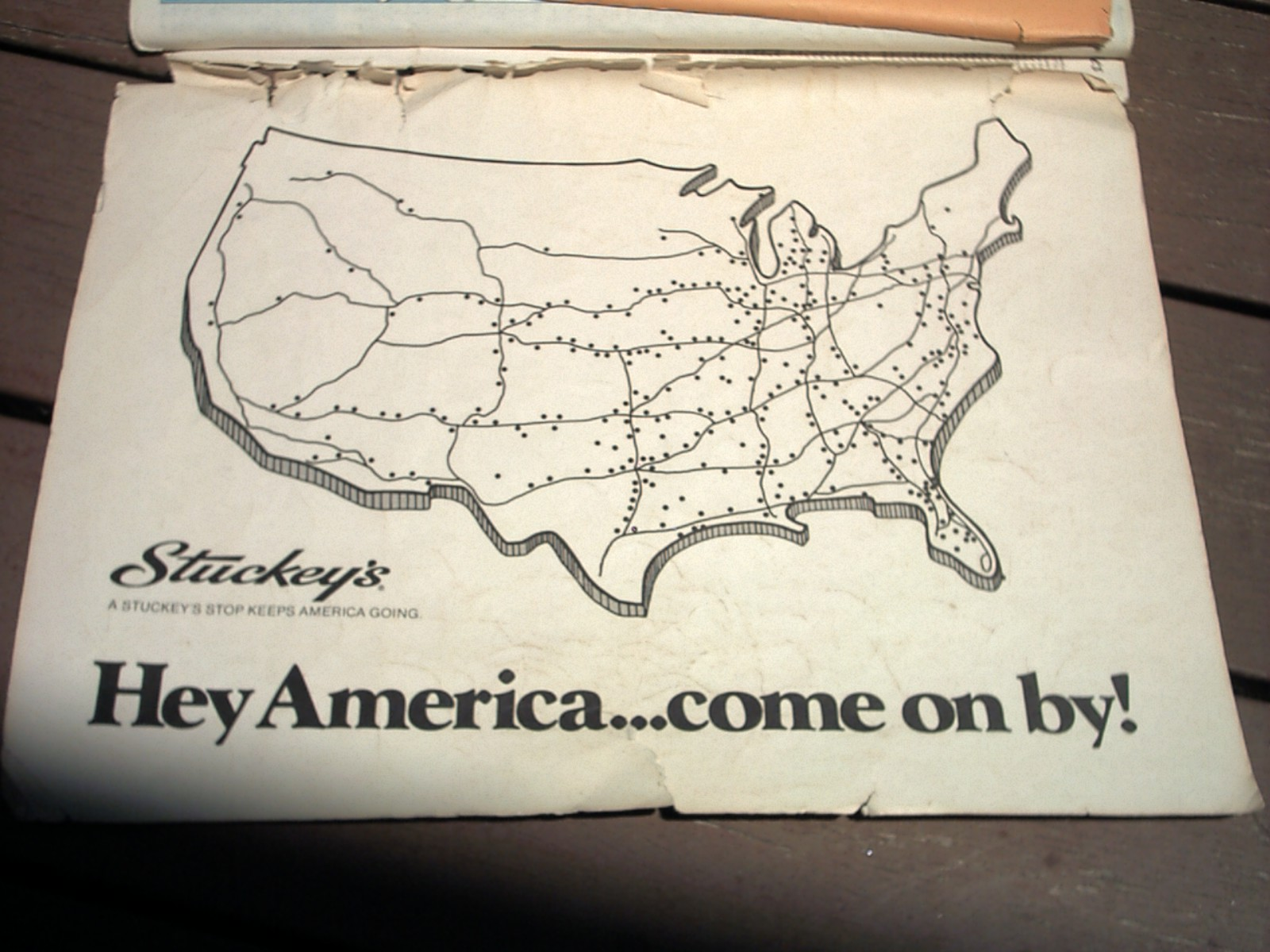
Stuckey's advertisement from 1976 Rand McNally Road Atlas

Business increased after Stuckey's wife Ethel began making pecan pralines, after having come up with a recipe for pecan log rolls with maraschino cherries added to the mix. Business improved enough that Stuckey built his own store in Eastman, opening another store in Unadilla, Georgia, soon after. Another soon followed in Hilliard, Florida, with each Stuckey's making its own candy on site.

Stuckey's franchise expansion was slowed by World War II when he was forced to close his Unadilla branch. During the war, Stuckey managed to stay afloat after buying a candy making factory in Jacksonville, Florida, and securing government contracts, making candy for the troops.

After the war ended, Stuckey's business opened a number of new franchises. The company then constructed its own candy factory in Eastman to supply an eventual 350-plus stores located throughout the continental US. As the post-war baby boom flourished and families undertook more long-distance auto travel, Stuckey's continued to grow along major highways.

=== Downfall and rise ===
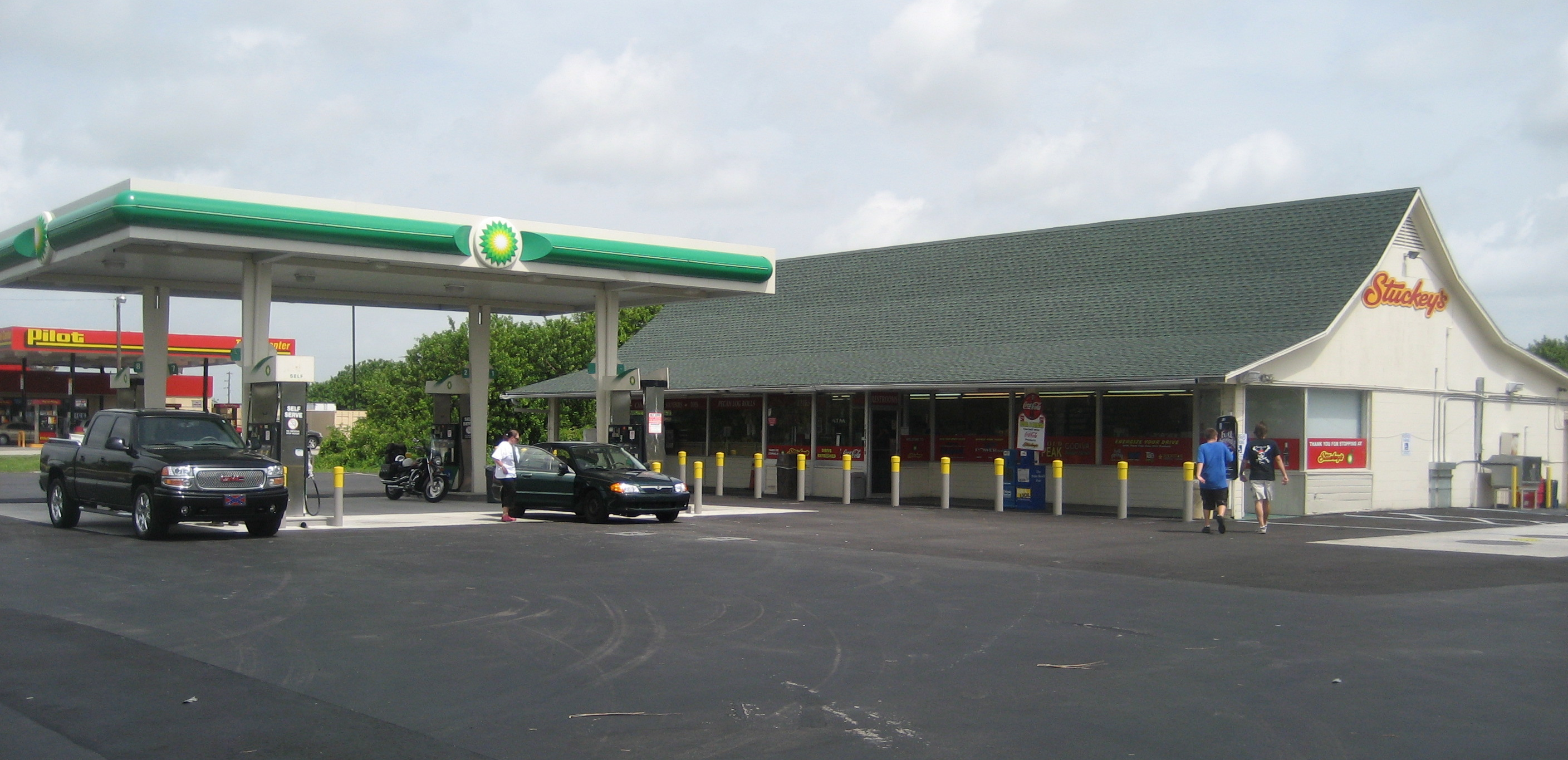
A modern Stuckey's/BP in Yeehaw Junction, Florida

In the early 1960s, with over 368 stores across the country now filled with candy, novelty toys, and kitschy souvenirs, the franchise became larger than Stuckey could himself handle, resulting in its sale to Pet, Inc., maker of Pet Milk.

W.S. Stuckey Sr. died in 1977, the same year that Illinois Central Industries, a Chicago conglomerate, bought Pet Milk Co.; the conglomerate began to close Stuckey's stores across the country. By the end of the decade, only 75 original stores remained.

In 1984, W.S. "Billy" Stuckey, Jr., son of the founder, repurchased Stuckey's with the intention of improving its fortunes. Stuckey came up with the idea of Stuckey's Express, a store-within-a-store concept that resulted in over 165 licensed stores in 17 states.

The business's growth increased following the intervention of W.S. Stuckey Sr.'s granddaughter, Ethel "Stephanie" Stuckey, who used her life's savings to buy the company from her father and became its CEO in November 2019.

In August 2020, Stuckey's acquired Front Porch Pecans, a pecan snack company that sells to domestic and foreign markets, including grocery channels in the Southeast U.S. With this merger, Stuckey's gained management support and co-owner, R.G. Lamar, who was named as new president to run Stuckey's with Stephanie.

In January 2021, Stephanie and R.G. acquired Atwell Pecans, The Orchards Gourmet, and Thames corporations to add candymaking, pecan processing, and fundraising businesses to the company's portfolio. In the same year, Ted Wright invested in the company, becoming the third co-owner. Ted is also the CEO of word-of-mouth marketing and growth strategy company Fizz, and focuses on the marketing of Stuckey's.

In August 2026, Stuckey's closed their production plant in Wrens, Georgia, citing increased operational costs and fuel prices resulting from the US government’s tariffs, as well as the impact of Hurricane Helene. In October the same year, the company filed for Chapter 11 bankruptcy following rising operational challenges.

== See also ==
- Buc-ee's
- Nickerson Farms
- Horne's
