= Powder Horn Mountain =

Coordinates: 36.17513°N 81.5265299°W

Powder Horn Mountain (PHM) is a privately owned, gated residential retirement community on 1,250 wooded acres in Triplett, Watauga County, North Carolina, located within the Blue Ridge Mountains.

In the 1970s, developer Bob Horne was inspired to build a tranquil mountain community that originally included a golf course and riding stables with trails in nearby Wilkes County. After undergoing bankruptcy and foreclosure, the development was divided and various areas sold separately. In order to save the community's existing homes from foreclosures, a group of property owners founded a partnership called the Laurel Creek Group and purchased the at-risk homes which enabled the creation of the Powder Horn Mountain Property Owners Association (PHM POA). The group then deeded the common property to the homeowners' association.

The golf course no longer exists as that section of the original PHM development is now owned by many private individual property owners / residences not connected with the current PHM POA. The many acres that incorporated the old horse stables and various riding trails of the original PHM were purchased some time in the 1980s and developed into the current gated Leatherwood residential community.

Recent years have seen the PHM community resuming steady but slow growth. The PHM POA annexed more than 200 acres (0.81 km^{2}) formerly known as "Brightwood IV" into Powder Horn Mountain in 2005, an area now known as Powder Horn Estates.

There is an unrelated Powder Horn Golf Community in Colorado .

== See also ==
Horne's
