= Schultz Building =

- Schultz Building (Atlantic National Bank Annex)
- U.S. National Register of Historic Places
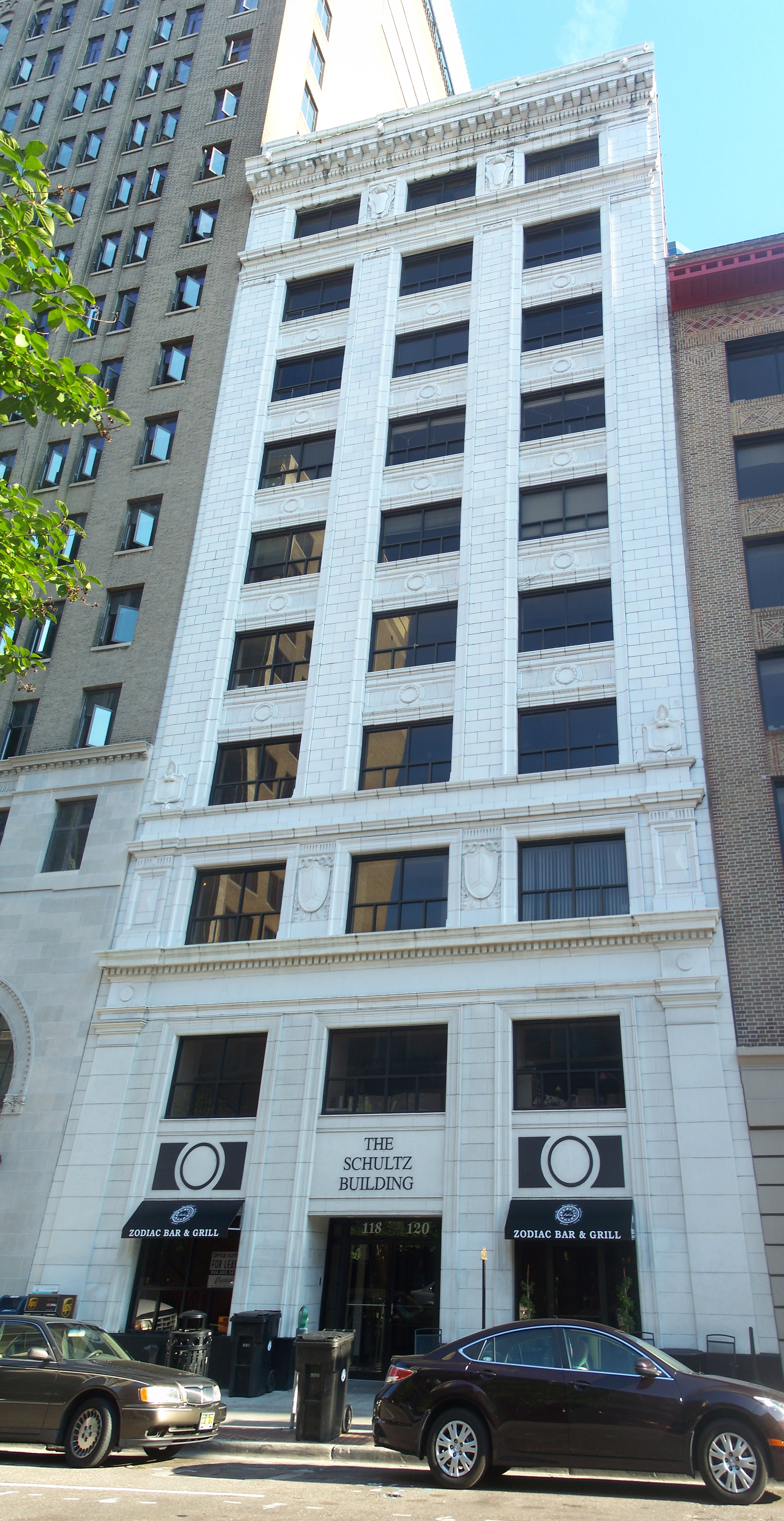

- Location within Florida Location within the United States
- Location: Jacksonville, Florida, USA
- Coordinates: 30°19′40″N 81°39′36″W
- Area: less than one acre
- Built: 1925–1926
- Built by: George A. Fuller Co.
- Architect: Marsh & Saxelbye
- MPS: Downtown Jacksonville MPS
- NRHP reference No.: 97001328
- Added to NRHP: November 7, 1997

The Schultz Building, formerly the Atlantic National Bank Annex, is a historic building in Jacksonville, Florida, United States. It was built between 1925 and 1926 for the Atlantic National Bank as an annex to the Atlantic National Bank Building, located immediately behind it. It stands at 118 West Adams Street, and was added to the U.S. National Register of Historic Places in 1997 as part of the Downtown Jacksonville Multiple Property Submission.

== History ==
The Atlantic National Bank, established in 1903, had built the Atlantic National Bank Building (now 121 Atlantic Center) on 121 West Forsyth Street in 1909. By 1925 the bank had grown such that it required additional space. To accommodate their needs, the bank built the Annex directly behind the headquarters at 118 West Adams Street.

The Annex was designed by Jacksonville architects Marsh and Saxelbye and constructed by New York City firm George A. Fuller Co. between 1925 and 1926. Though it had a different architect than the headquarters, its facade is very similar to the older building's, with white terra cotta and decorative elements such as cartouches, a balustrade, and a dentiled cornice. The building stands ten stories high and cost around $400,000 to build.

The Atlantic National Bank merged with First Union in 1985, and both buildings subsequently changed hands. The Annex's lower facade was altered. In the 1990s it was recognized as one of Jacksonville's most significant historic buildings, and was included in the Downtown Jacksonville Multiple Property Submission, a Multiple Property Submission to the National Register of Historic Places. It was added to the National Register on November 7, 1997.

== See also ==
- Architecture of Jacksonville
