= 121 Atlantic Place =

Historic skyscraper in Jacksonville, Florida

Coordinates: 30.32464°N 81.39556°W

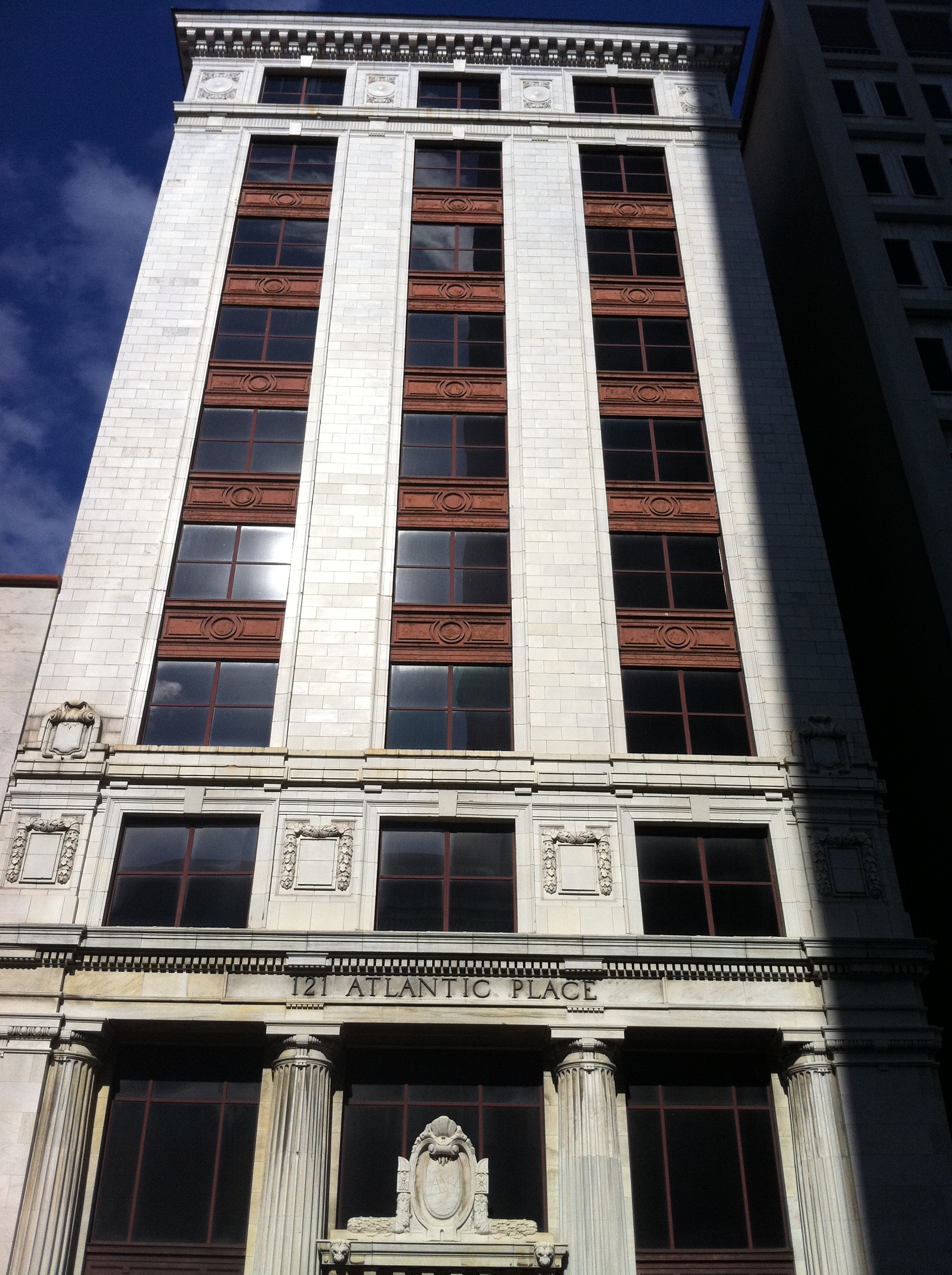
121 Atlantic Place, the former Atlantic National Bank Building

121 Atlantic Place, formerly the Atlantic National Bank Building, is a historic skyscraper in Jacksonville, Florida. It was built in 1909 as the headquarters for the Atlantic National Bank, and is located at 121 West Forsyth Street. It was the tallest building in Jacksonville and in Florida from 1909 to 1912, and remains an office building today.

== History ==
The building was designed by New York City architects Mowbray and Uffinger and built between 1908 and 1909 by the James Stewart Company for the Atlantic National Bank. The steel frame structure stands at 10 stories and 135 feet (41 m) high, and includes a white Sylacauga marble covering on the bottom two floors and white terra cotta on the upper eight. The facade includes ornate detailing, two-story columns around the entrance, and other decorative elements.

The building was constructed amid a three-way race with the Bisbee Building and the Seminole Hotel to become Jacksonville's first skyscraper. All three buildings were located on Forsyth Street within a block of each other, and all three were ten stories tall. The Atlantic National Bank Building broke ground in August 1908, shortly after the Bisbee Building but before the Seminole Hotel. The Bisbee opened just before the Atlantic National Bank Building the following year, winning the race. However, at 41 meters the Atlantic Bank Building was taller than the others, making it the tallest building in Jacksonville and the tallest in Florida at the time. It held that position until the Florida Life Building was completed in 1912.

The Atlantic National Bank, founded by Edward W. Lane, Thomas P. Denham, and Fred W. Hoyt in 1903, relocated its bank room from the nearby Dyal-Upchurch Building to the new headquarters. In 1926 the bank opened the Atlantic National Bank Annex directly behind the Bank Building on West Adams Street. This building, now known as the Schultz Building, was added to the National Register of Historic Places in 1997. In 1985 Atlantic National Bank merged with First Union, which was in turn acquired by Wachovia (and subsequently Wells Fargo). The Atlantic National Bank Building changed hands over the years, becoming known as 121 Atlantic Place, but is still in use as an office building. It was renovated in the 2000s, with a five-story addition added to the west. One unique feature of the structure is its pedestrian tunnel connecting to the BB&T Bank Building, the only such tunnel in Downtown Jacksonville still in use. This tunnel, originally created to facilitate secure travel between buildings, has been home to a small restaurant, Benny's, since 1985.

== See also ==
- Architecture of Jacksonville

Records
Preceded by Dyal-Upchurch Building	Tallest building in Jacksonville; 1909–1912; 41m	Succeeded by Florida Life Building
Preceded by Dyal-Upchurch Building	Tallest building in Florida; 1909–1912; 41m	Succeeded by Florida Life Building
