= Plaza Hotel (Jacksonville) =

- U.S. National Register of Historic Places
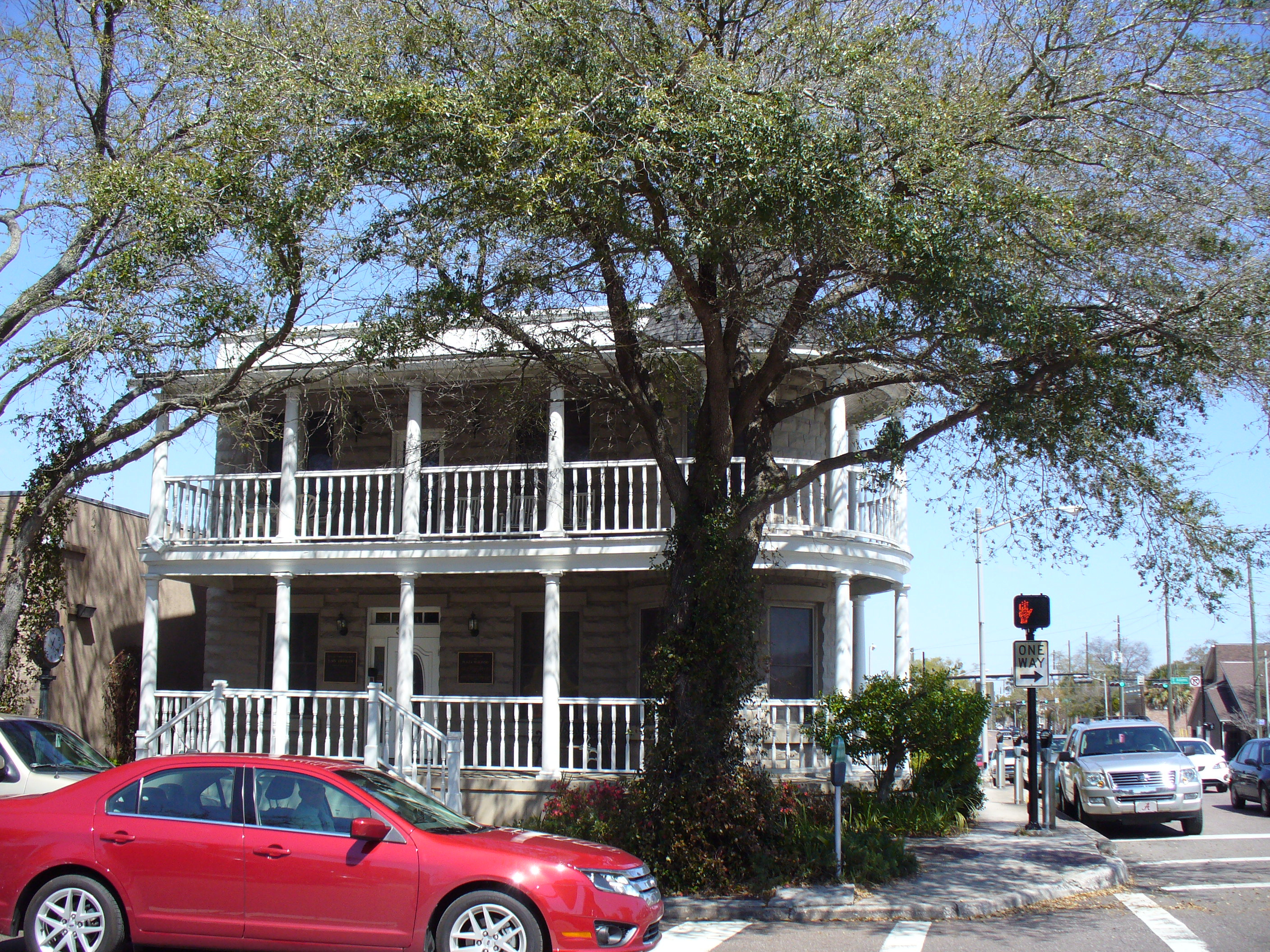
- Plaza Hotel, Jacksonville, FL

- Location within Florida Location within the United States
- Location: 353 E. Forsyth St., Jacksonville, Florida
- Coordinates: 30°19′33″N 81°38′13″W
- Built: 1903
- Architect: William F. Ivers
- Architectural style: Masonry Vernacular
- MPS: Downtown Jacksonville MPS
- NRHP reference No.: 92001698
- Added to NRHP: December 30, 1992

The Plaza Hotel is a historic hotel in Jacksonville, Florida. On December 30, 1992, it was added to the U.S. National Register of Historic Places.
