= Atlantic National Bank =

American bank

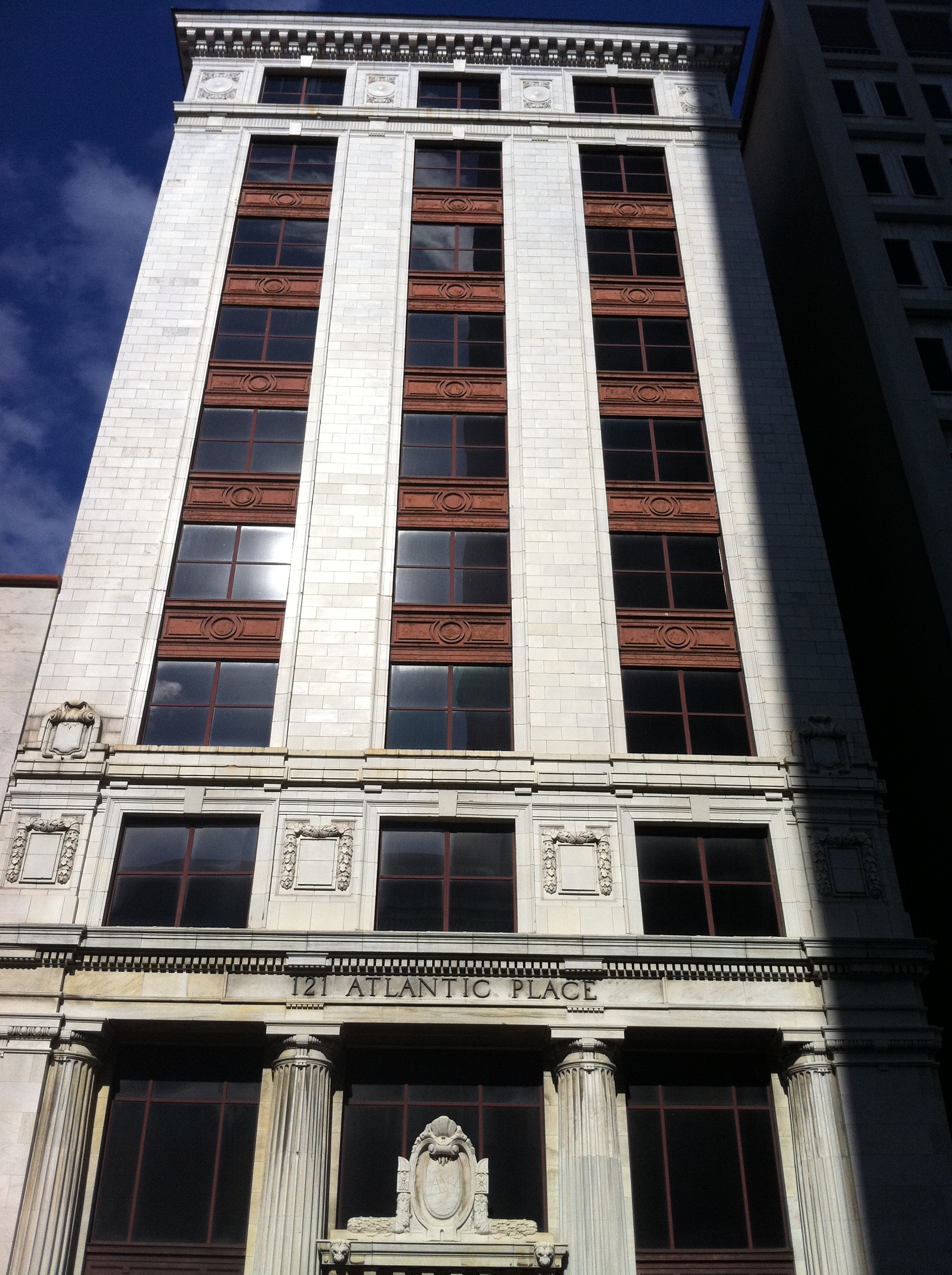
121 Atlantic Place, the former Atlantic National Bank Building

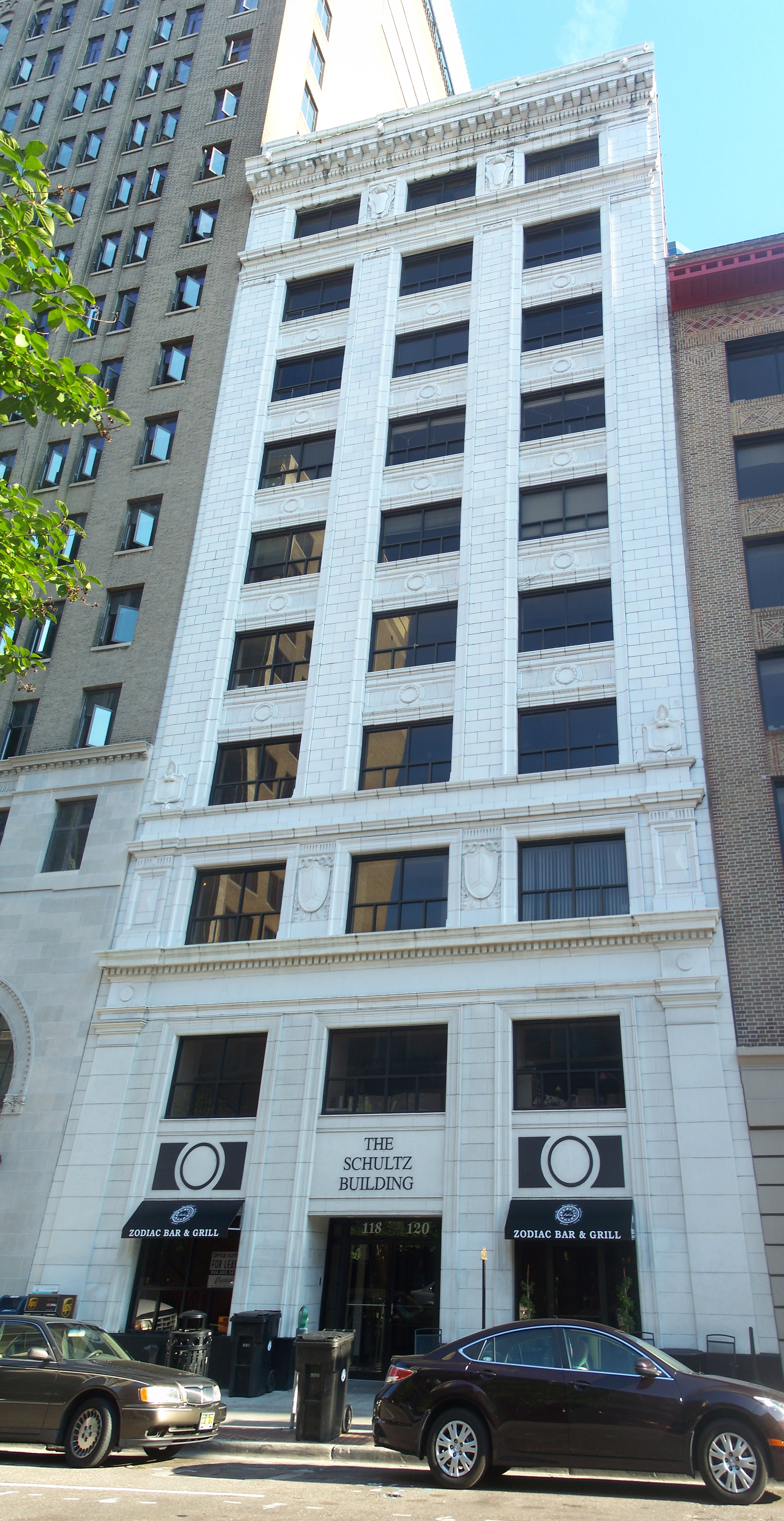
The former Atlantic National Bank Annex

The Atlantic National Bank was an American bank based in Jacksonville, Florida. It existed from 1903 until 1985, when it was acquired by First Union. Subsequently, First Union changed its name to Wachovia Corporation when it also acquired Wachovia National Bank, then the merged company was acquired by Wells Fargo in 2008. The company constructed two significant buildings in Downtown Jacksonville: 121 Atlantic Place (formerly the Atlantic National Bank Building) and the Schultz Building (formerly the Atlantic National Bank Annex).

== History ==
Founded in 1903 by Edward W. Lane, railroad magnate Thomas P. Denham, and Fred W. Hoyt, Atlantic National Bank was one of the most significant locally based banking institutions of its era. As time passed the bank went national, and developed correspondent relationships with banks in other regions of the country, including Wells Fargo in San Francisco.

The bank was initially located in the Dyal-Upchurch Building in Downtown Jacksonville, but built its own building, the Atlantic National Bank Building (now 121 Atlantic Place) between 1908 and 1909. The building narrowly lost out in a race to become Jacksonville's first skyscraper, but at 135-foot (41 m) in height, it was slightly taller than its competition, making it the tallest building in Florida at the time. By 1926 the bank had grown so much that it opened the Atlantic National Bank Annex (now the Schultz Building) directly behind the main building. Both buildings are among the most historically significant in Jacksonville.

In 1961 Edward Lane, Jr., son of founder Edward Lane, was named president. In 1976 he became chairman of the holding company, and the bank grew to include assets of $3.9 billion. In 1985 Lane negotiated the merger of Atlantic National Bank with First Union of Charlotte, North Carolina. First Union was subsequently absorbed by Wachovia and then Wells Fargo.
