= Elks Club Building (Jacksonville) =

Historic building in Jacksonville, Florida, US

- U.S. National Register of Historic Places
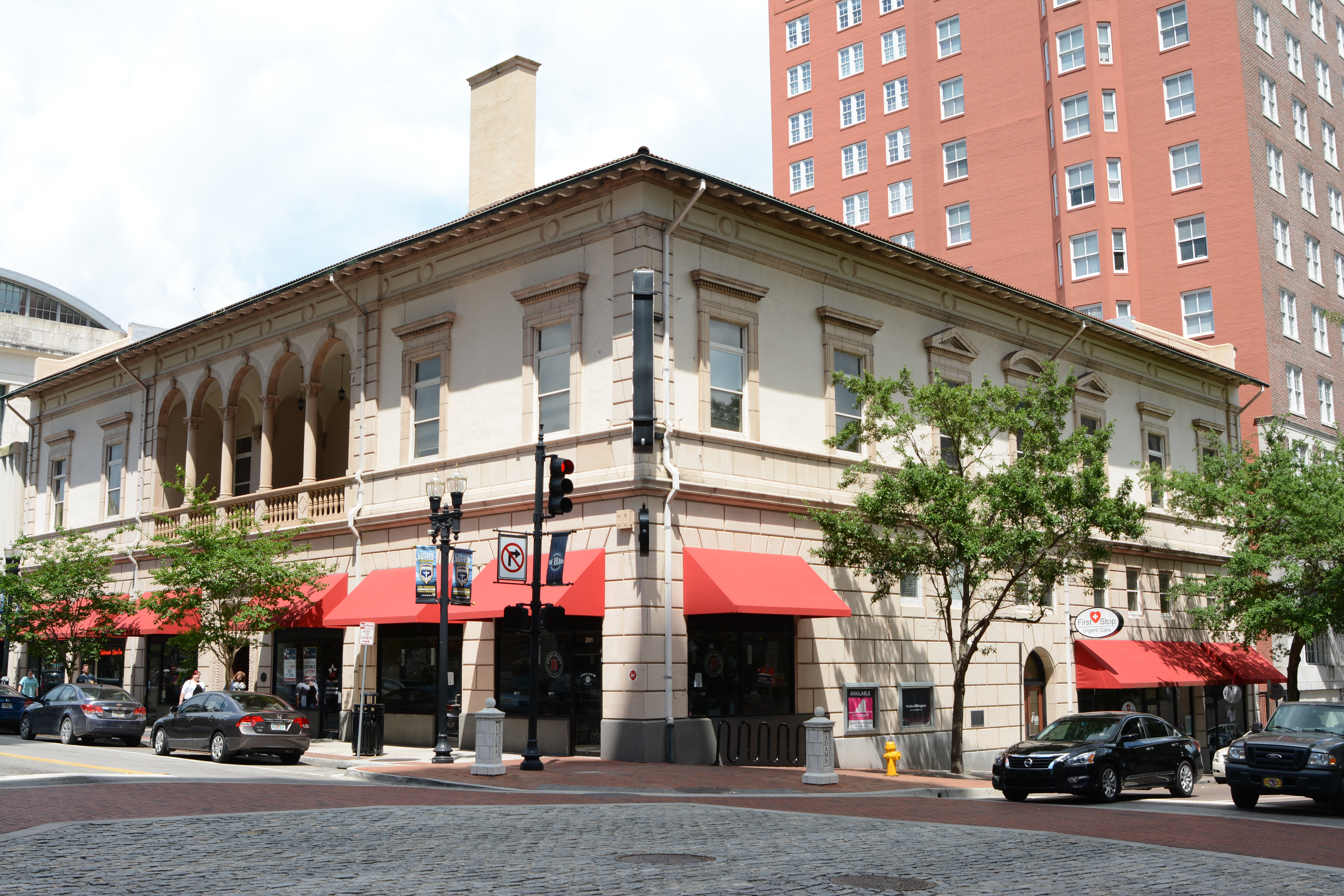
- The building in 2016

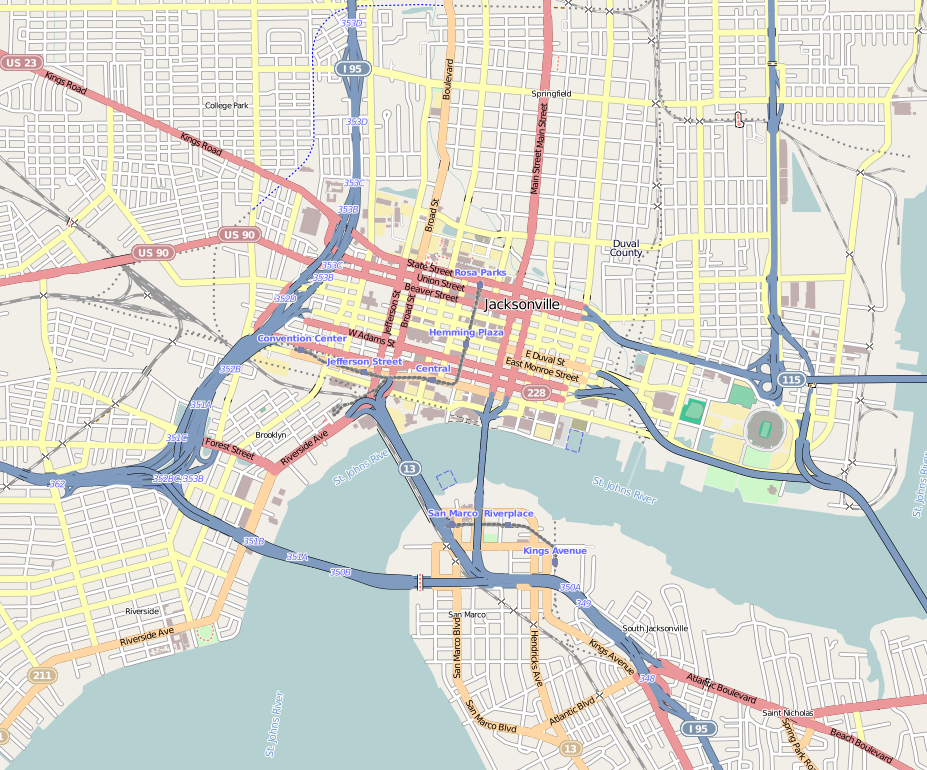
- Location within Central Jacksonville Location within Florida
- Location: Jacksonville, Florida, USA
- Coordinates: 30.32818°N 81.6588°W
- Area: less than one acre
- Architect: Roy A. Benjamin
- Architectural style: Mediterranean
- MPS: Downtown Jacksonville MPS
- NRHP reference No.: 00000151
- Added to NRHP: March 9, 2000

The Elks Club Building is a historic site in Jacksonville, Florida. It is located at 201-213 North Laura Street. As its name implies, it was once a headquarters for the local chapter of The Elks. On March 9, 2000, it was added to the U.S. National Register of Historic Places, because of the historic influence of Elks establishments in the United States communities.

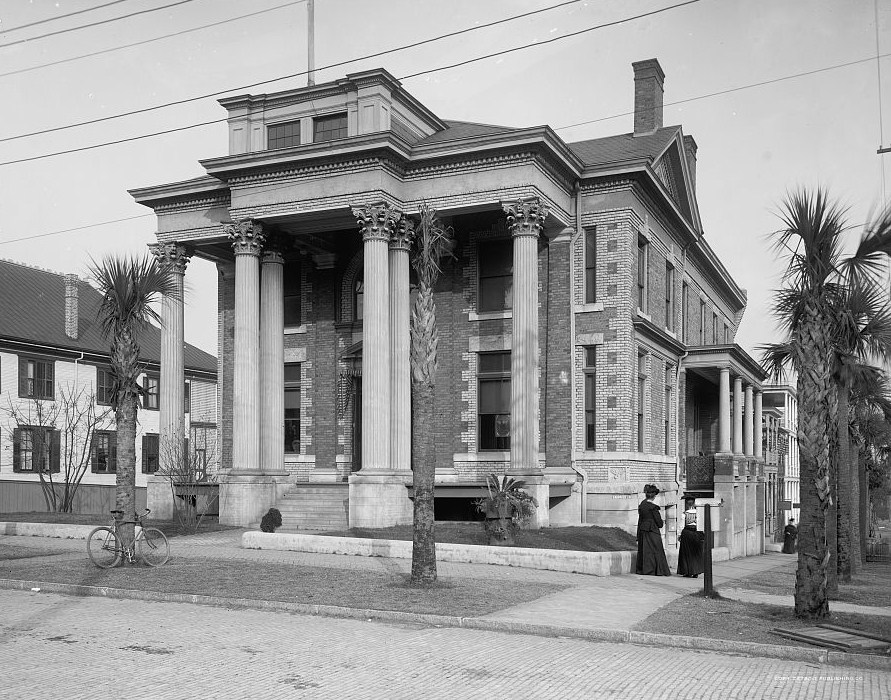
Elks' Club Building in 1905
