= History of Jacksonville, Florida =

American municipal history

The city of Jacksonville, Florida, began to grow in the late 18th century as Cow Ford, settled by British colonists. Its major development occurred in the late nineteenth century, when it became a winter vacation destination for tourists from the North and Midwest. Its development was halted or slowed by the Great Fire of 1901, the Florida Land Bust of the 1920s, and the economic woes of the 1960s and 70s. Since the late 20th century, the city has experienced steady growth, with a new federal building constructed in downtown in 2003.

Since 1940, Jacksonville has also been a major port for the United States Navy. The city is a thriving metropolis with over a million citizens. Due to its consolidated city-county government structure, it has the largest municipal population among Florida cities, as well as the largest land area of any city in the contiguous United States.

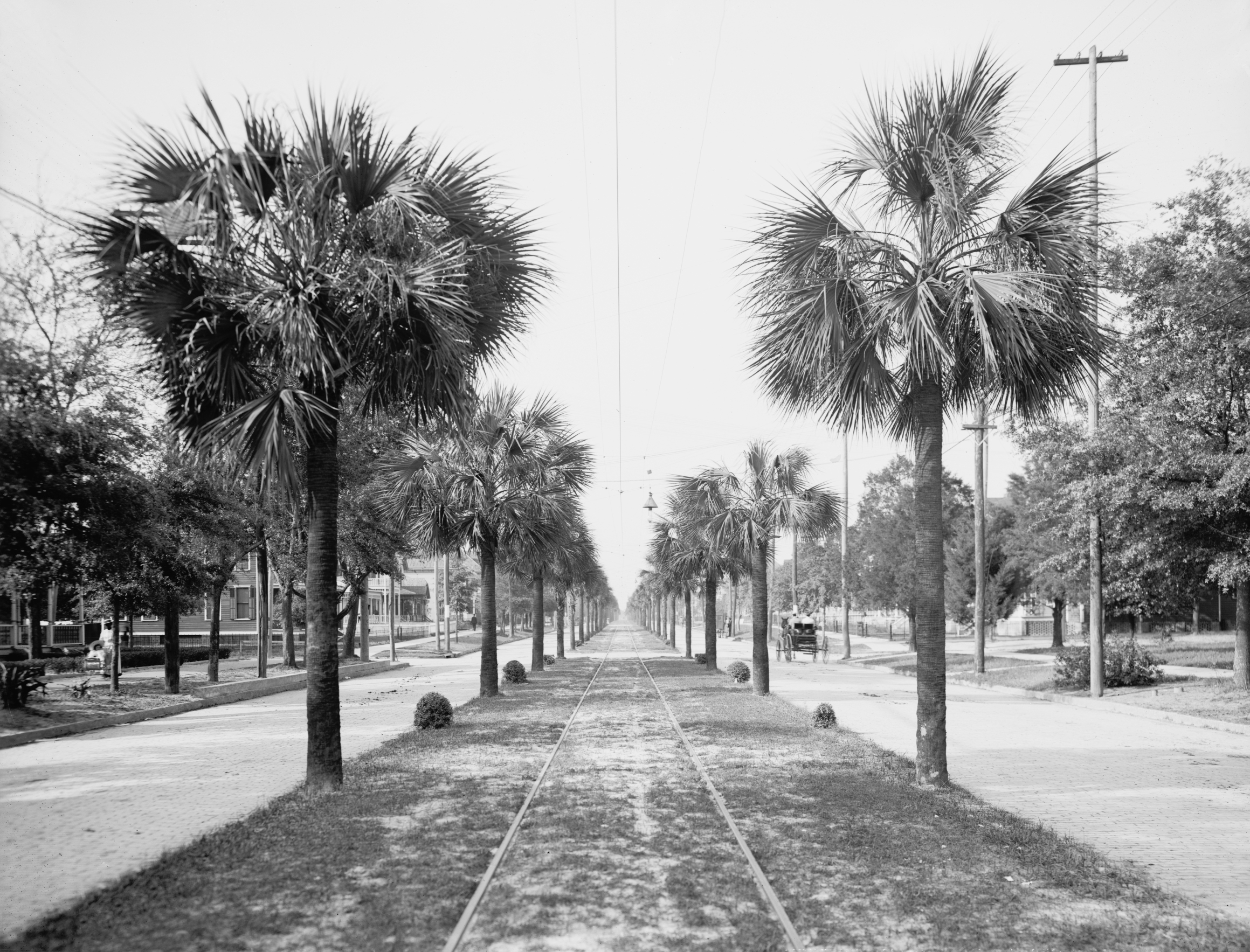
Jacksonville's Main Street and boulevard, circa 1903

== Early days ==
=== Ancient history ===
Archaeological evidence indicates 6,000 years of human habitation in the area. Pottery has been found dating to 2500 BC, nearly the oldest in the United States and second to artifacts of the Savannah River area. In the 16th century, the beginning of the historical record period, the area was inhabited by the Mocama, a coastal subgroup of the Timucua indigenous Native Americans. At the time of contact with Europeans, most Mocama villages in present-day Jacksonville were part of the powerful chiefdom known as the Saturiwa, centered on Fort George Island near the mouth of the St. Johns River. They had a complex society, well-adapted to the environmental conditions of the area.

=== Colonial and territorial history ===
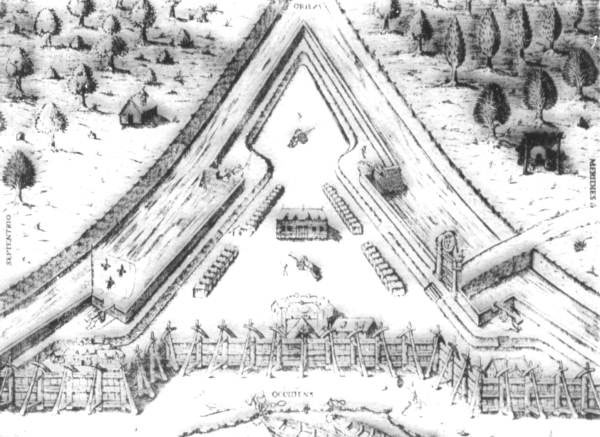
Fort Caroline shown in an old etching

In 1513, Spanish explorers landed in Florida and claimed their discovery for Spain (see Spanish Florida). The first Europeans to visit the area were Spanish missionaries and explorers from this period. In February 1562, French naval officer Jean Ribault and 150 settlers arrived seeking land for a safe haven for the French Huguenots, Protestants suffering religious persecution in France. Ribault explored the mouth of the St. Johns River before moving north and establishing the colony of Charlesfort on what is now Parris Island, South Carolina. Ribault returned to France for supplies, but the French Wars of Religion had broken out during his absence. His return to Florida was delayed as a result. Without leadership or provisions, the colonists abandoned Charlesfort. In 1564 Ribault's former lieutenant, René Goulaine de Laudonnière, launched a new expedition to found a colony on the St. Johns River. On June 22, 1564, the settlers established Fort Caroline atop the St. Johns Bluff.

Laudonnière made an alliance with the local tribe of Timucua Indians, the Saturiwa. He also forged friendly relations with their competitors, the Utina tribe, who lived upriver to the south (around what is now Palatka and the Lake George area). Ribault intended to resupply Fort Caroline in early 1565, but was again delayed. As a result, the colony faced famine, three mutinies, and eventually warfare with the Utina. Ribault finally reached the fort with a relief expedition in the summer, and assumed command of the settlement. In the meantime, the Spanish admiral Pedro Menéndez de Avilés had established the colony of St. Augustine 35 miles to the south, with the express mission to displace the French.

When he arrived, Ribault launched a naval expedition of 200 sailors and 400 soldiers to dislodge the Spanish, but a storm at sea incapacitated them for several days and caused numerous deaths. On September 20, 1565, Menéndez marched his men overland to Fort Caroline, defended by 200 or 250 people, and killed everyone except for 50 women and children and 26 men who escaped. The Spanish picked up the survivors of Ribault's fleet, and summarily executed all but 20.

The Spanish took over Fort Caroline, renaming it as San Matteo. In 1568 the French and Spanish confronted each other again here, when Dominique de Gourgues burned it to the ground. The Spanish rebuilt the fort, but abandoned it in 1569. The Spanish next built Fort San Nicolas further upriver to protect the rear flank of St. Augustine. "San Nicolas" served as their name for the Jacksonville area, a placename which survives in the neighborhood of St. Nicholas. The fort was located on the east side of the St. Johns, where Bishop Kenny High School now stands. The fort was abandoned in the late 17th century.

France and Spain were defeated by the British in the French and Indian War. During the war the British had defeated the Spanish in Cuba and occupied the island, whereas Florida had hardly seen any fighting. As part of the negotiations between the two nations in the aftermath of the war, Spain would cede Florida to Great Britain in exchange for the return of Cuba. The British agreed and Florida was ceded to the United Kingdom in 1763. The British soon constructed the King's Road connecting St. Augustine to Georgia. The road crossed the St. Johns River at a narrow point, which the Seminole called Wacca Pilatka and the British named the "Cow Ford", both names ostensibly reflecting the fact that cattle were brought across the river there. The British divided Florida into the two colonies of British East Florida and British West Florida.

The British government gave land grants to officers and soldiers who had fought in the French and Indian War in order to encourage settlement. In order to induce settlers to move to the two new colonies reports of Florida's natural wealth were published in England. A large number of British colonists who were "energetic and of good character" moved to Florida, mostly coming from South Carolina, Georgia and England though there was also a group of settlers who came from the colony of Bermuda. This would be the first permanent English-speaking population in what is now Duval County, Baker County, St. Johns County and Nassau County. The British built good public roads and introduced the cultivation of sugar cane, indigo and fruits as well the export of lumber. As a result of these initiatives northeastern Florida prospered economically in a way it never did under Spanish rule. Furthermore, the British governors were directed to call general assemblies as soon as possible in order to make laws for the Floridas and in the meantime they were, with the advice of councils, to establish courts. This would be the first introduction of much of the English-derived legal system which Florida still has today including trial-by-jury, habeas corpus and county-based government.

The British gave control of the territory back to Spain in 1783. Americans of English descent and Americans of Scots-Irish descent began moving into northern Florida from the backwoods of Georgia and South Carolina. Though technically not allowed by the Spanish authorities, the Spanish were never able to effectively police the border region and the backwoods settlers from the United States would continue to migrate into Florida unchecked. These migrants, mixing with the already present English-speaking settlers who had lived in Florida since the British period, would be the progenitors of the population known as Florida Crackers. The Spanish also accepted fugitive slaves from the newly-created United States if they accepted Catholic baptism.

Between 1812 and 1814 during the War of 1812 between the US and Britain, the US Navy assisted American settlers in Florida in "The Patriot War", a covert attempt to seize control of Florida from the Spanish. They began with invasions of Fernandina and Amelia Island. Spain sold the Florida Territory to the United States in 1821 and, by 1822, Jacksonville's current name had come into use, to honor General Andrew Jackson. It first appears on a petition sent on June 15, 1822 to U.S. Secretary of State John Quincy Adams, asking that Jacksonville be named a port of entry. The city is named for Andrew Jackson, military governor of the Florida Territory and eventual President of the United States. U.S. settlers led by Isaiah D. Hart wrote a charter for a town government, which was approved by the Florida Legislative Council on February 9, 1832. Remembered as the city's most important founding father, Hart is memorialized with the Isaiah D. Hart Bridge over the St. Johns.

=== Civil War ===
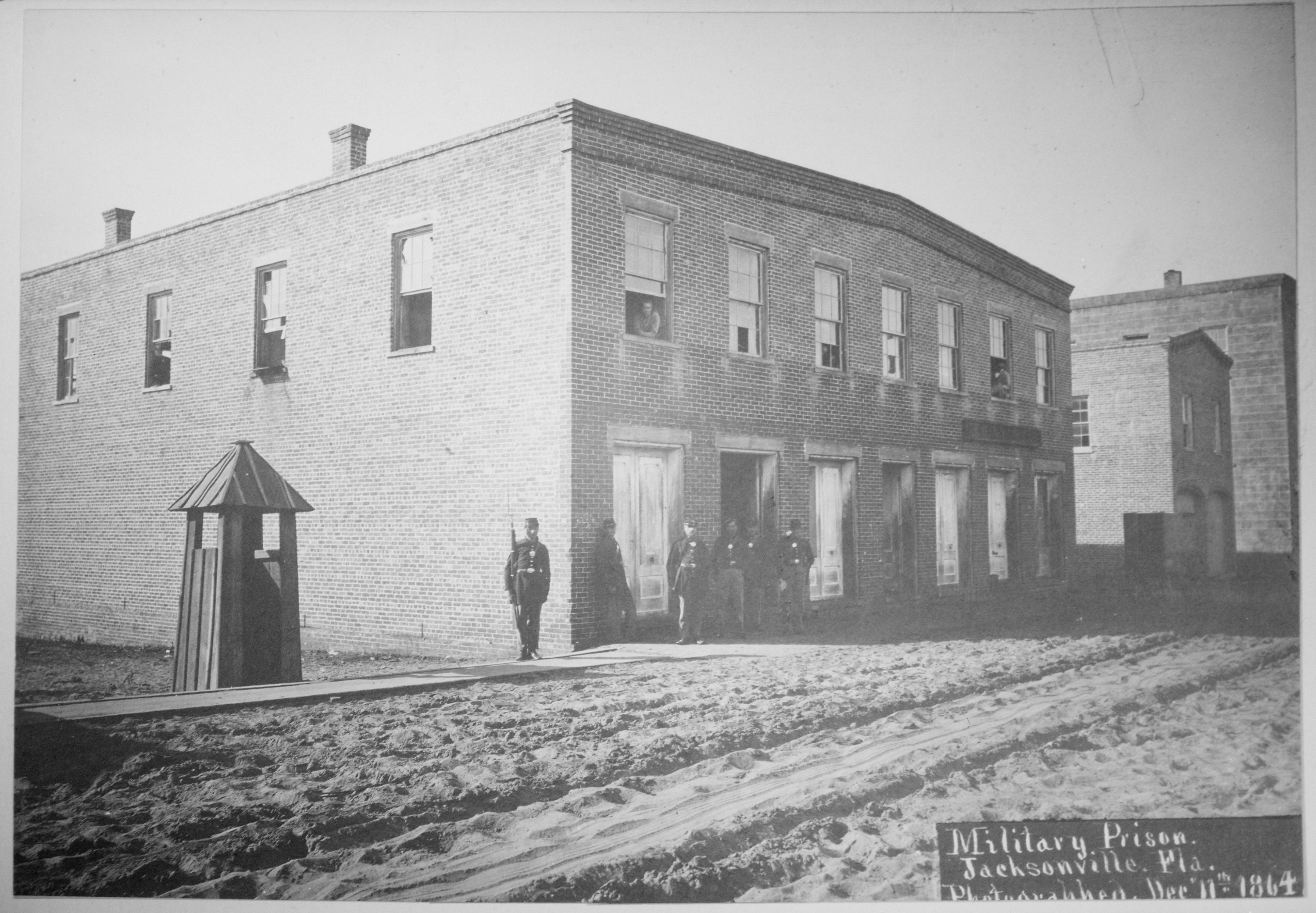
Military prison in Jacksonville during the American Civil War.

Even before the outbreak of war, a militia unit was raised in Jacksonville in April 1859. The unit, called the Jacksonville Light Infantry, would become Company A of the 3rd Florida Infantry Regiment. The company carried a battle flag bearing the slogan "Let Us Alone" and was commanded by Dr. Holmes Steele, a former mayor of the city.

During the American Civil War, Jacksonville was a key supply point for hogs and cattle leaving Florida and aiding the Confederate cause. Throughout most of the war, the US Navy maintained a blockade around Florida's ports, including Jacksonville. In October 1862 Union forces captured a Confederate battery in the Battle of St. Johns Bluff and occupied Jacksonville. Throughout the war Jacksonville changed hands several times, though never with a battle. On February 20, 1864, Union soldiers from Jacksonville marched inland and confronted the Confederate Army at the Battle of Olustee.

The battle was a devastating loss for the Union and a decisive victory for the Confederacy. Soldiers on both sides were veterans of the great battles in the eastern and western theaters of war, but many of them remarked in letters and diaries that they had never experienced such terrible fighting. The Confederate dead were buried at Oaklawn Cemetery in nearby Lake City. The Union losses caused Northern authorities to question the necessity of further Union involvement in the militarily insignificant region of northern Florida. On the morning of 22 February, as the Union forces were still retreating to Jacksonville, the 54th Massachusetts was ordered to counter-march back to Ten-Mile Station. The locomotive of a train carrying wounded Union soldiers had broken down and the wounded were in danger of capture. When the 54th Massachusetts arrived, the men attached ropes to the engine and cars and manually pulled the train approximately three miles to Camp Finnegan, where horses were secured to help pull the train. After that, the train was pulled by both men and horses to Jacksonville for a total distance of ten miles. It took forty-two hours to pull the train that distance.

The US Transport Maple Leaf was sunk at Jacksonville, April 1, 1864. The U.S. Transport General Hunter was sunk in the St. John's River, April 16, 1864, close to where the Maple Leaf was sunk. In the fall of 1865, a black enlisted man in the 3rd USCT was hung by his thumbs for stealing from a field kitchen. The punishment led to a riot and gunfire was exchanged between black enlisted men and their white officers. The riot was put down and several soldiers were put on trial for mutiny, with 6 of them being executed.

By the end of the war in 1865, a Union commander commented that Jacksonville had become "pathetically dilapidated, a mere skeleton of its former self, a victim of war."

== Post Civil War ==
=== Winter resort era ===
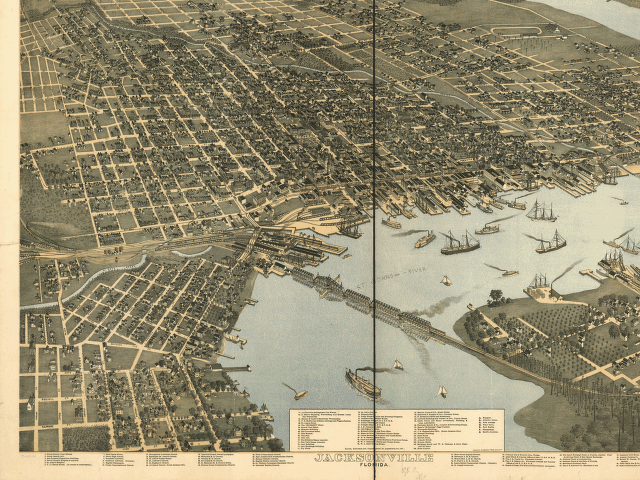
1893 bird's eye view of Jacksonville, with steamboats moving throughout the St. Johns River

Following the Civil War, during Reconstruction and afterward, Jacksonville and nearby St. Augustine became popular winter resorts for the rich and famous of the Gilded Age. Visitors arrived by steamboat and (beginning in the 1880s) by railroad, and wintered at dozens of hotels and boarding houses. The 1888 Subtropical Exposition was held in Jacksonville and attended by President Grover Cleveland, but the Florida-style world's fair did not lead to a lasting boost for tourism in Jacksonville. The area declined in importance as a resort destination after Henry Flagler extended the Florida East Coast Railroad to the south, reaching Palm Beach in 1894 and the Miami area in 1896. This drew tourism to the southern Atlantic Coast.

=== 1872 Jacksonville tornado ===
In the early morning hours of March 10, 1872, a violent tornado struck rural Duval County, following a path about 9 miles long and up to a mile wide just west of downtown Jacksonville. The storm caused complete destruction to several houses and structures, while also uprooting Oak Trees and scouring the ground. From this tornado 6 died, and 15 were injured.

=== Yellow fever epidemics ===
Jacksonville's prominence as a winter resort was dealt another blow by major yellow fever epidemics in 1886 and 1888. During the second one, nearly ten percent of the more than 4,000 victims died, including the city's mayor. In the absence of scientific knowledge concerning the cause of yellow fever, nearly half (10,000 out of 25,000) of the city's panicked residents fled despite the imposition of quarantines. Inbound and outbound mail was fumigated in an effort to reduce contagion. Jacksonville's reputation as a healthful tourist destination suffered. The African-American population did not appear to catch the disease, leading the panicked population into erroneously believing that the black residents were "carriers" of the Yellow Fever. In fact, Black people had immunity from catching the disease earlier, as children.

=== Spanish–American War ===
During the Spanish–American War, gunrunners helping the Cuban rebels used Jacksonville as the center for smuggling illegal arms and supplies to the island. Duval County sheriff and future state governor, Napoleon Bonaparte Broward, was one of the many gunrunners operating out of the city. Author Stephen Crane travelled to Jacksonville to cover the war.

== 20th century ==
=== Great Fire of 1901 ===
On May 3, 1901, downtown Jacksonville was ravaged by the Great Fire—the largest-ever urban fire in the Southeastern United States, which started when hot ash from a shantyhouse's chimney landed on the drying moss at Cleaveland's Fiber Factory. At half past noon most of the Cleaveland workers were at lunch, but by the time they returned the entire city block was engulfed in flames. The fire destroyed the business district and rendered 10,000 residents homeless in the course of eight hours. Florida Governor William S. Jennings declared a state of martial law in Jacksonville and dispatched several state militia units to help. Reconstruction started immediately, and the city was returned to civil authority on May 17. Despite the widespread damage, only seven deaths were reported.

Young architect Henry John Klutho had just returned to New York from a year in Europe when he read about the Jacksonville fire and, seeing a rare opportunity, he headed south. Klutho and other architects, enamored by the "Prairie Style" of architecture then being popularized by architect Frank Lloyd Wright in Chicago and other Midwestern cities, designed exuberant local buildings with a Florida flair. While many of Klutho's buildings were demolished by the 1980s, a number of his creations remain, including the St. James Building from 1911 (a former department store that is now Jacksonville's City Hall) and the Morocco Temple from 1910. The Klutho Apartments, in Springfield, were recently restored and converted into office space by local charity Fresh Ministries. Despite the losses of the last several decades, Jacksonville still has one of the largest collections of Prairie Style buildings (particularly residences) outside the Midwest.

=== Motion picture industry ===
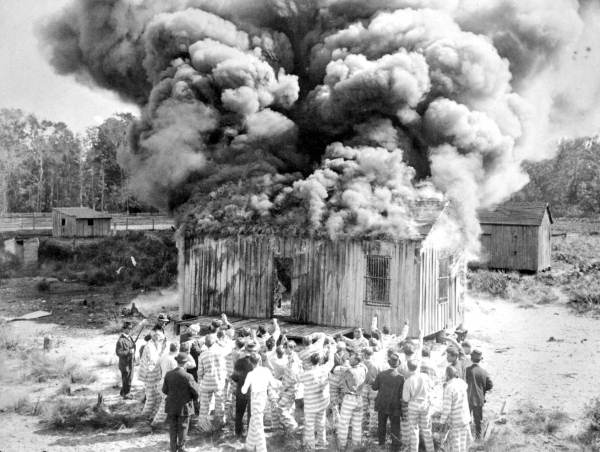
Motion picture scene at Gaumont Studios, circa 1910s.

In the early 20th century, before Hollywood, the motion picture industry was based in Fort Lee, New Jersey#America's first motion picture industry. In need of a winter headquarters, moviemakers were attracted to Jacksonville due to its warm climate, exotic locations, excellent rail access, and cheaper labor, earning the city the title of "The Winter Film Capital of the World."

In 1908, New York-based Kalem Studios was the first to open a permanent studio in Jacksonville. Over the course of the next decade, more than 30 silent film companies established studios in town, including Metro Pictures (later MGM), Edison Studios, Majestic Films, King Bee Film Company, Vim Comedy Company, Norman Studios, Gaumont Studios and the Lubin Manufacturing Company.

In 1914, Oliver "Babe" Hardy, a comedic actor and Georgia native, began his motion picture career in Jacksonville. He starred in over 36 short silent films his first year acting. With the closing of Lubin in early 1915, Oliver moved to New York then New Jersey to find film jobs. Acquiring a job with the Vim Company in early 1915, he returned to Jacksonville in the spring of 1917 before relocating to Los Angeles in October 1917.

In 1915, Joseph Engel opened Metro Pictures in Jacksonville.

In 1917, the first motion picture made in Technicolor and the first feature-length color movie produced in the United States, The Gulf Between, was filmed on location in Jacksonville.

Jacksonville's mostly conservative residents, however, objected to the hallmarks of the early movie industry, such as car chases in the streets, simulated bank robberies and fire alarms in public places, and even the occasional riot.

In 1917, conservative Democrat John W. Martin was elected mayor on the platform of taming the city's movie industry. By that time, southern California was emerging as the major movie production center, thanks in large part to the move of film pioneers like William Selig and D.W. Griffith to the area. These factors hastened the demise of Jacksonville as a place for film production.

In 1920, Richard Norman, founder of Norman Film Manufacturing Company, a European American, purchased the bankrupt Eagle Film studios, on the Eagle Film City property in Jacksonville’s rural Arlington section. and created a string of African American films starring black actors in the vein of Oscar Micheaux and the Lincoln Motion Picture Company. In contrast to the degrading parts offered in certain white films such as The Birth of a Nation, Norman and his contemporaries sought to create positive stories featuring African Americans in what he termed "splendidly assuming different roles."

=== "Gateway to Florida" ===
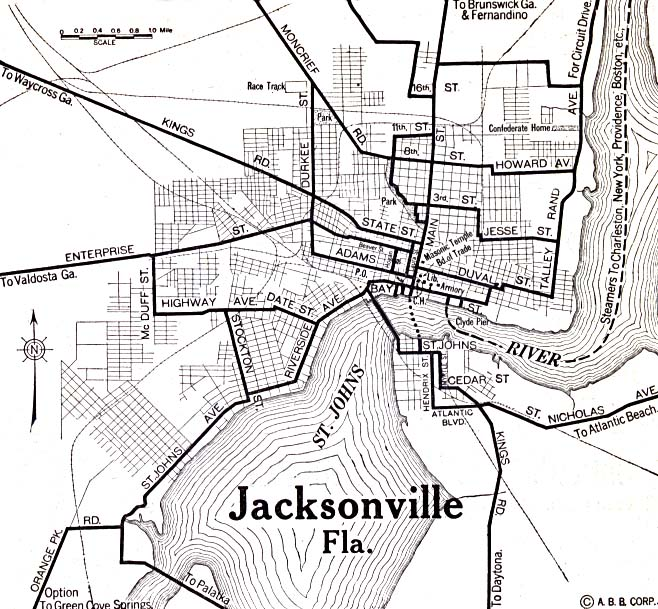
Map of Jacksonville in 1920

The 1920s brought significant real estate development and speculation to the city during the great Florida land boom (and bust). Hordes of train passengers passed through Jacksonville on their way south to the new tourist destinations of South Florida, as most of the passenger trains arriving from the population centers of the North were routed through Jacksonville.

The Riverside Theater, which opened in 1927, was the first theater in Florida to show talking pictures.

Completion of the Dixie Highway (portions of which became U.S. 1) in the 1920s began to draw significant automobile traffic as well. An important entry point to the state since the 1870s, Jacksonville now justifiably billed itself as the "Gateway to Florida."

=== US Navy ===
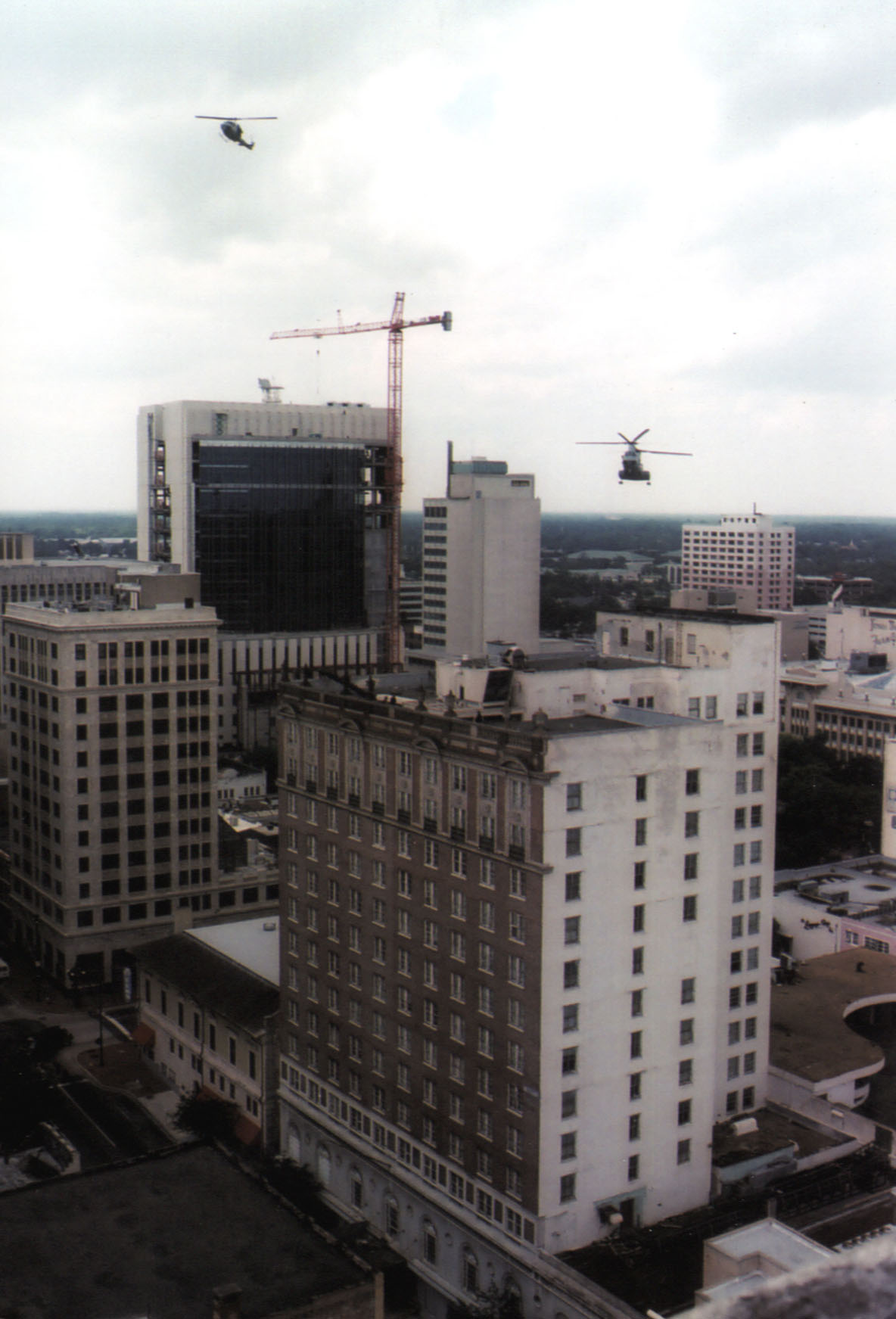
U.S. Marines train by air in a downtown drill. In the foreground is the former Hotel Roosevelt.

A significant part of Jacksonville's growth in the 20th century came from the presence of navy bases in the region. October 15, 1940, Naval Air Station Jacksonville ("NAS Jax") on the westside became the first navy installation in the city. This base was a major training center during World War II, with over 20,000 pilots and aircrewmen being trained there. After the war, the Navy's elite Blue Angels were established at NAS Jax. Today NAS Jax is the third largest navy installation in the country and employs over 23,000 civilian and active-duty personnel.

In June 1941, land in the westernmost side of Duval County was earmarked for a second naval air facility. This became NAS Cecil Field, which during the Cold War was designated a Master Jet Base, the only one in the South. RF-8 Crusaders out of Cecil Field detected missiles in Cuba, precipitating the Cuban Missile Crisis. In 1993, the Navy decided to close NAS Cecil Field, and this was completed in 1999. The land once occupied by this installation is now known as the "Cecil Commerce Center" and contains one of the campuses of Florida Community College which now offers civil aeronautics classes.

December 1942 saw the addition of a third naval installation to Jacksonville: Naval Station Mayport at the mouth of the St. Johns River. This port developed through World War II and today is the home port for many types of navy ships, most notably the aircraft carrier USS John F. Kennedy from 1995 to 26 July 2007, when Big John was towed away, eventually to be mothballed in Philadelphia. NS Mayport current employs about 14,000 personnel.

Jacksonville is also not far from Naval Submarine Base Kings Bay in St. Marys, Georgia, which is home to part of the US Navy's nuclear-powered ballistic missile submarine (SSBN) fleet.

The naval base became a key training ground in the 1950s and 1960s and as such, the population of the city rose dramatically. More than half of the residents in Jacksonville had some tie to the naval base, whether it be a relative stationed there, or due to employment opportunities, by 1970, necessitating the opening of an international airport in the area.

=== Hotel Roosevelt fire ===
On December 29, 1963, a fire gutted the first couple of stories of the Hotel Roosevelt on Adams Street, killing 22 people, setting a record for the highest one-day death toll in Jacksonville history. The hotel was later abandoned, with most businesses inside moving to the nearby Hotel George Washington.

=== Floating nuclear power plants ===
Offshore Power Systems (OPS) was a 1970 joint venture between Westinghouse Electric Company, who constructed nuclear generating plants, and Newport News Shipbuilding and Drydock, who had recently merged with Tenneco, to create floating nuclear power plants at the Port of Jacksonville. Construction of the new facility was projected to cost $200 million and create 10,000 new jobs when completed in 1976. Contracts were signed by Public Service Electric and Gas Company with PSE&G paying for the startup costs for the manufacturing facility. Westinghouse named Zeke Zechella to be president of OPS in 1972.

OPS obtained 850+ acres (3.4 km2) on Blount Island from the Jacksonville Port Authority (JPA) for $2,000/acre, then installed infrastructure using over 1,000 workers. A total of $125 million was invested in the property and facility, however; no plants were ever built.

=== Ax Handle Saturday ===
Because of its high visibility and patronage, the Hemming Park and surrounding stores were the site of numerous civil rights demonstrations in the 1960s. Black Sit-ins began on August 13, 1960 when students asked to be served at the segregated lunch counter at Woolworths, Morrison's Cafeteria and other eateries. They were denied service and kicked, spit at and addressed with racial slurs. This came to a head on "Ax Handle Saturday", August 27, 1960. A group of 200 middle aged and older white men (allegedly some were also members of the Ku Klux Klan) gathered in Hemming Park armed with baseball bats and ax handles. They attacked the protesters conducting sit-ins. The violence spread, and the white mob started attacking all African-Americans in sight. Rumors were rampant on both sides that the unrest was spreading around the county (in reality, the violence stayed in relatively the same location, and did not spill over into the mostly-white, upper-class Cedar Hills neighborhood, for example). A black street gang called the "Boomerangs" attempted to protect the demonstrators. Police, who had not intervened when the protesters were attacked, now became involved, arresting members of the Boomerangs and other black residents who attempted to stop the beatings.

Nat Glover, who worked in Jacksonville law enforcement for 37 years, including eight years as Sheriff of Jacksonville, recalled stumbling into the riot. Glover said he ran to the police, expecting them to arrest the thugs, but was told to leave town or risk being killed.

Several whites had joined the black protesters on that day. Richard Charles Parker, a 25-year-old student attending Florida State University was among them. White protesters were the object of particular dislike by racists, so when the fracas began, Parker was hustled out of the area for his own protection. The police had been watching him and arrested him as an instigator, charging him with vagrancy, disorderly conduct and inciting a riot. After Parker stated that he was proud to be a member of the NAACP, Judge John Santora sentenced him to 90 days in jail.

=== Hurricanes ===
Jacksonville has been largely spared from the impacts of hurricanes. Hurricane Dora made landfall near St. Augustine, Florida on September 11, 1964, with winds of 110 mph (175 km/h), becoming the first on record to make landfall in the region. Despite the storm damage, over 20,000 fans attended a live concert the next day at the Gator Bowl Stadium by the British rock-and-roll band, "The Beatles". The winds were blowing so hard that Ringo Starr's drum set had to be nailed down to the stage.

Dora was the only storm in recorded history to affect Jacksonville with hurricane-force winds, though the city has been affected by weaker storms as well as hurricanes that lost intensity before reaching the area. In September 1999, after Hurricane Floyd struck the Bahamas, over one million Floridians were evacuated from coastal areas, many of them from Jacksonville. Mayor John Delaney announced the mandatory evacuation of the Jacksonville Beaches and other low lying neighborhoods early on September 14; in total, nearly 80,000 Jacksonville residents left their homes. Ultimately the storm turned northward 125 miles off the coast, causing only minor damage in Jacksonville and the southeastern U.S. before making landfall in North Carolina. In September 2017, Jacksonville experienced record flooding from Hurricane Irma.

=== Consolidation ===
Through the 1960s Jacksonville, like most other large cities in the US, suffered from the effects of urban sprawl. To compensate for the loss of population and tax revenue and end waste and corruption, voters elected to consolidate the government of Jacksonville with the government of Duval County. The move was carried out on October 1, 1968, and Hans Tanzler, elected mayor of Jacksonville the year before, became the first mayor of the consolidated government. Jacksonville became the largest city in Florida and the 13th largest in the United States, and has a greater land area than any other American city outside Alaska. All areas of Duval County are considered part of Jacksonville besides the four independent municipalities of Jacksonville Beach, Atlantic Beach, Neptune Beach, and Baldwin, although residents of these towns vote in city elections and are eligible for services provided by Jacksonville.

Claude Yates began the "quiet revolution" with the Yates Manifesto and J. J. Daniel was chairman of the Local Government Study Commission. Lex Hester was Executive Director of the commission and the key architect of Jacksonville's consolidated government, transition coordinator and chief administrative officer following consolidation.

== See also ==
- List of people from Jacksonville, Florida
- Timeline of Jacksonville, Florida
- History of African Americans in Jacksonville

== Bibliography ==
- Bartley, Abel A. (2000). Keeping the Faith: Race, Politics, and Social Development in Jacksonville, Florida, 1940–1970. Greenwood Press. Archived from the original on 2007-06-24 – via Questia.
