= Thomas V. Porter House =

- Thomas V. Porter Mansion
- U.S. National Register of Historic Places
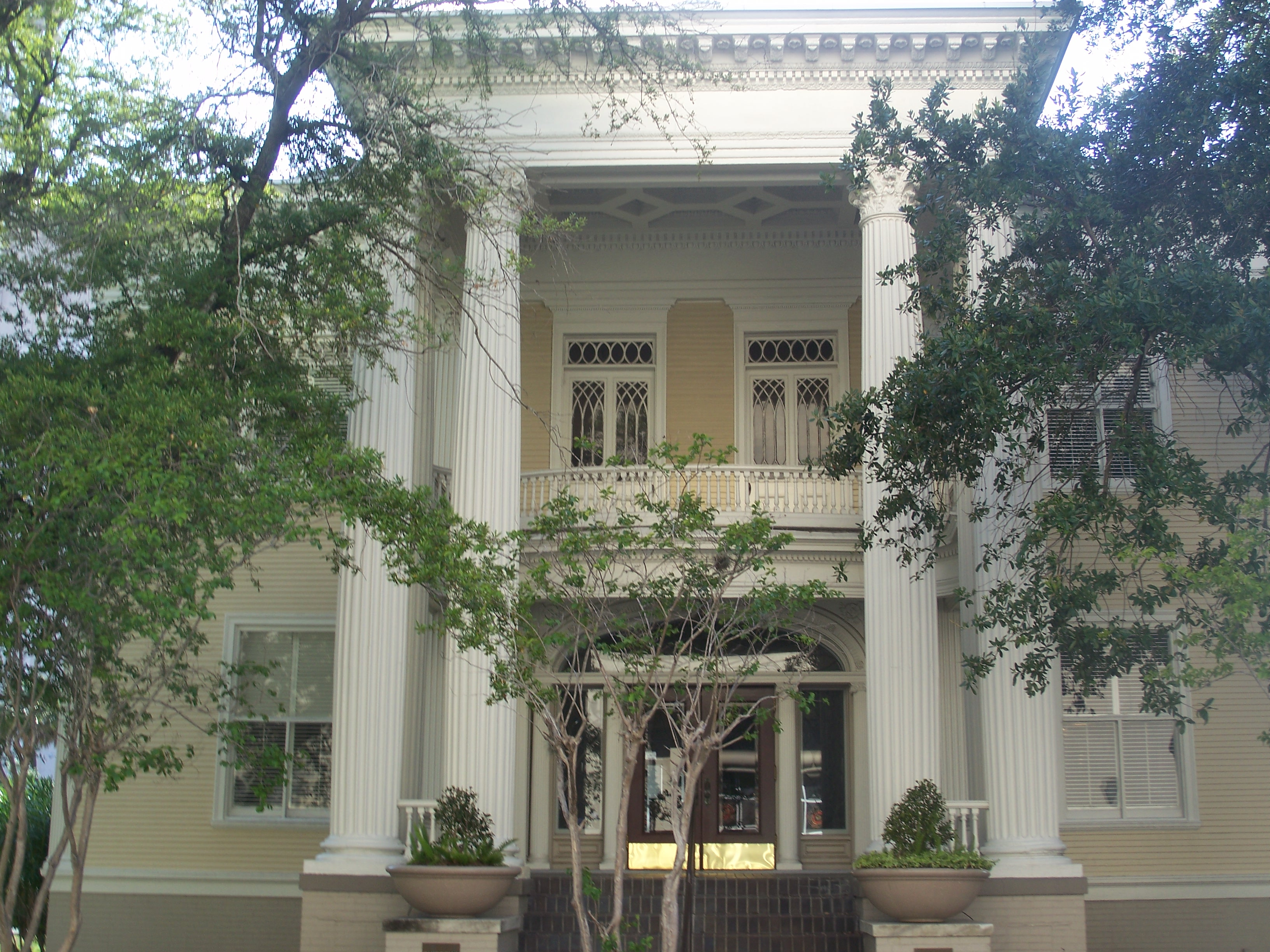

- Location within Florida Location within the United States
- Location: Jacksonville, Florida, USA
- Coordinates: 30.33124°N 81.66091°W
- Architect: Henry John Klutho
- Architectural style: Classical Revival, Colonial Revival
- NRHP reference No.: 76000592
- Added to NRHP: May 13, 1976

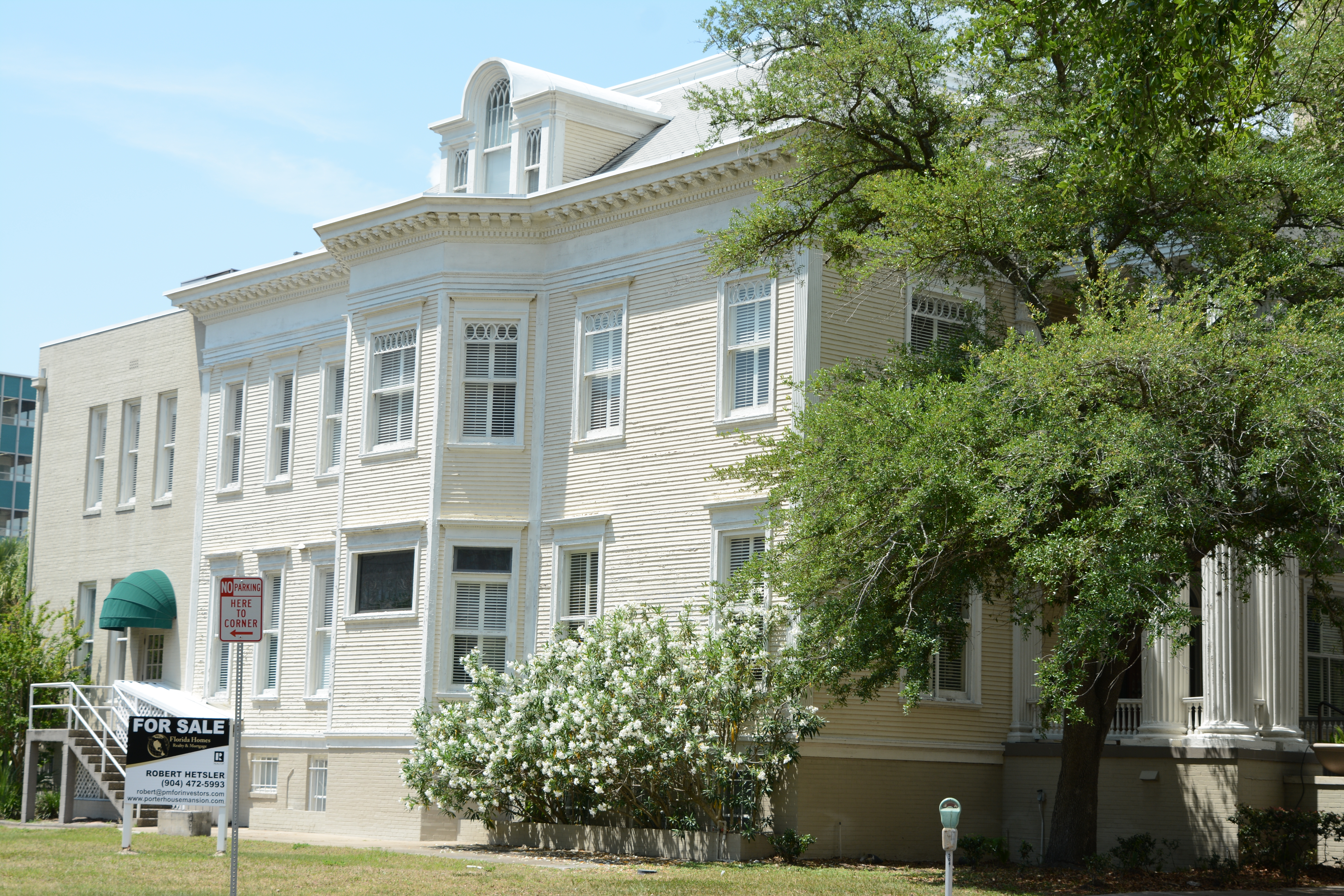
Side view

The Thomas V. Porter House is a historic home in Jacksonville, Florida. It is located at 510 Julia Street, and was designed by New York City architect Henry John Klutho. On May 13, 1976, it was added to the U.S. National Register of Historic Places.

== History ==
The mansion was constructed for Thomas V. Porter, a successful businessman in wholesale groceries and, later, a developer. When it was constructed in 1902, the mansion faced Church street at the corner of Julia. This intersection was among the most prominent residential areas of Downtown after the Great Fire of 1901, with the stately home of U.S. Senator James P. Taliaferro across the street from the Porter residence, and the mansion of Mayor Duncan U. Fletcher (later U.S. Senator) on the opposite corner.

In 1902, Henry J. Klutho, 28, already a pioneer of modern American architecture was selected to design the mansion, which the architect described as "Classic Colonial", as one of his first commissions after the Great Fire of 1901. His Dyal-Upchurch Building and Jacksonville City Hall were also being completed that same year. The highlight of the Porter mansion is the grand two-story portico with six Corinthian columns, a serpentine balcony and a coffered ceiling. The mansard roof originally had a widow's walk. Initially the mansion featured an ornate one-story veranda on three sides. This colonnaded veranda was removed when the mansion was purchased in 1925 by the First Christian Church, which moved Porter's home around the corner to its present location. The church used the mansion as offices and Sunday school classrooms. They also added a two-story section to the rear of the mansion for additional office space.
