= Jacob Elias Cohen =

American businessman (1862–1927)

- Born: April 1, 1862; Dublin, Ireland
- Died: June 1, 1927 (age 65)
- Known for: President and CEO of Cohen Brothers
- Spouse: Hattie Halle
- Children: 5
- Parent(s): Rae Heyman Cohen; Elias Cohen

Jacob Elias Cohen (April 1, 1862 – June 1, 1927) was an American businessman who served as president and CEO of Cohen Brothers department store in Jacksonville, Florida. He was nicknamed "Wanamaker of the South" after John Wanamaker the proprietor of Wanamaker's department store.

== Biography ==
Cohen was born to a Jewish family on April 1, 1862, in Dublin, Ireland, the youngest of eight children of Rae (née Heyman) and Elias Cohen. His family was originally from Germany but soon returned to Berlin and opened a general merchandise store. After the American Civil War, the family immigrated to New York City where they opened Cohen Brothers, a company dedicated to the import of dry goods (textiles, clothing, and sundries). In 1867, two of his brothers, Morris and Samuel visited Jacksonville, Florida, which was still recovering from the Civil War and recognized the pent-up demand for dry goods. In 1867, they moved the family business to Jacksonville which then had a mere 4,000 residents. Cohen attended public schools in New York City and then joined his brothers (along with a third brother Julius ) in Jacksonville in 1875 which had grown to 7,000 residents. In 1880, Jacob assumed control of the store after his brother Samuel moved to New York City to work as a purchasing agent and Morris moved to England where he became engaged in the lace business. Jacob established a "one-price" policy with fixed price tags where there was no negotiating involved, an unusual practice at the time. In 1890, the population increased to 17,000 and Cohen moved the business into the Gardner Building, Jacksonville's first skyscraper and Florida's tallest building. In 1891, Julius died of typhoid fever.

In 1901, Jacksonville burned to the ground and Cohen built a 300,000 square foot store on the site of the burned down St. James Hotel designed by Architect Henry John Klutho promising that the building would be "institution for the people." Under Cohen's tutelage, Cohen Brothers became Florida's largest department store. In 1958, The May Department Stores Company acquired the Cohen Brothers Department Store turning it into the May Cohens chain.

== Personal life ==
In 1887, Cohen married Hattie Halle; they had five children: Edna (1888); Halle (1893); Rae (1895); Hazel (1897); and Minna Cohen Seitner (1899). Cohen died on June 1, 1927.
