= Henry John Klutho House =

- U.S. National Register of Historic Places
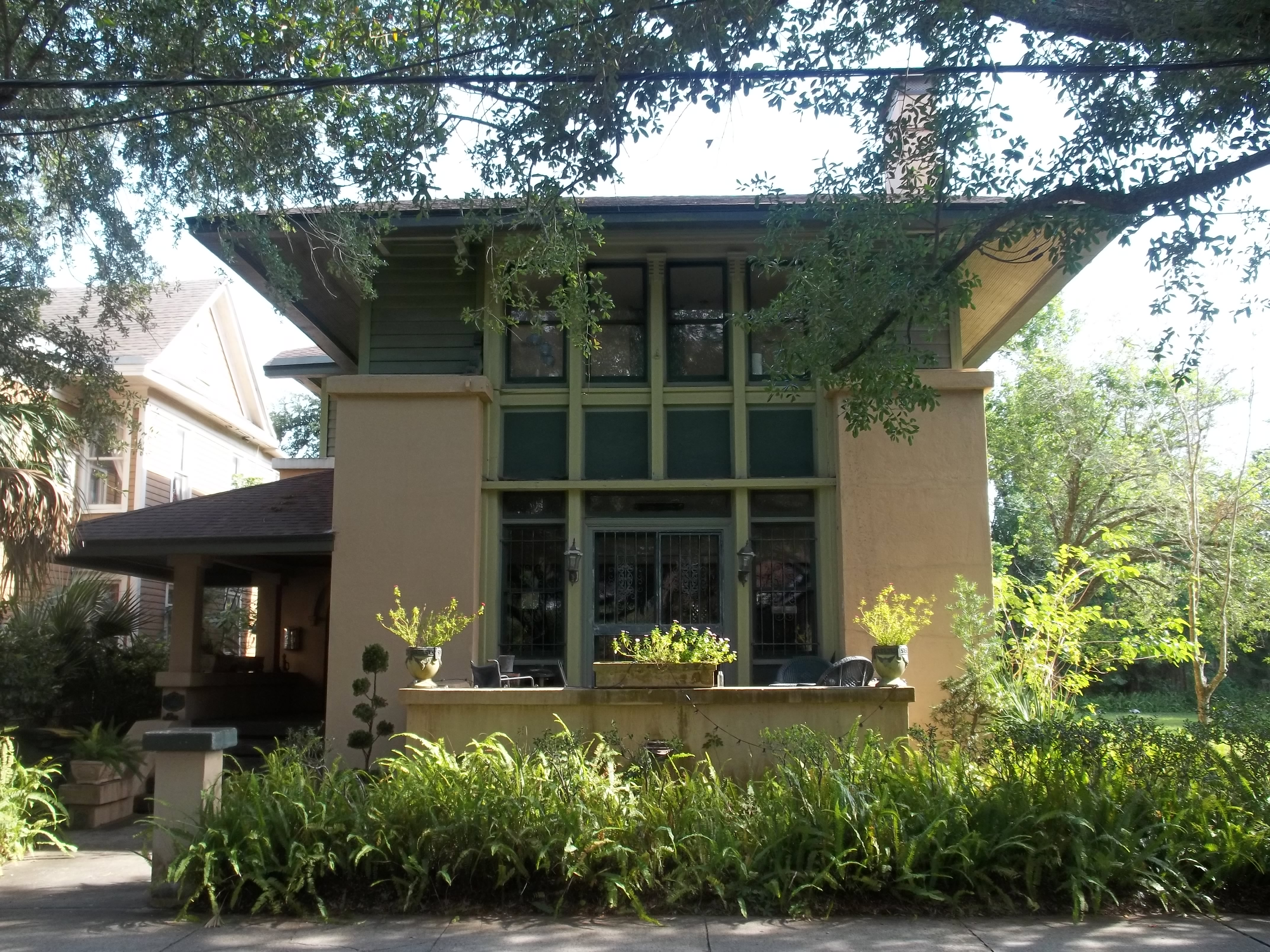

- Location within Florida Location within the United States
- Location: Jacksonville, Florida, USA
- Coordinates: 30°20′48″N 81°39′18″W
- Architect: Henry John Klutho
- Architectural style: Prairie School
- NRHP reference No.: 78000939
- Added to NRHP: December 19, 1978

The Henry John Klutho House (also known as the Klutho Residence) is a historic home in Jacksonville, Florida. The house was designed and lived in by the New York City architect Henry John Klutho, who helped in the rebuilding of Jacksonville after the Great Fire of 1901. It is located at 28-30 West 9th Street. On December 19, 1978, it was added to the U.S. National Register of Historic Places.
