= Laura Street (disambiguation) =

Laura Street may refer to:

- Laura Street - a street in the Northbank district of Jacksonville, Florida.
- Laura Street Trio - a group of historic buildings in Jacksonville, Florida, United States
