= Dyal–Upchurch Building =

- U.S. National Register of Historic Places
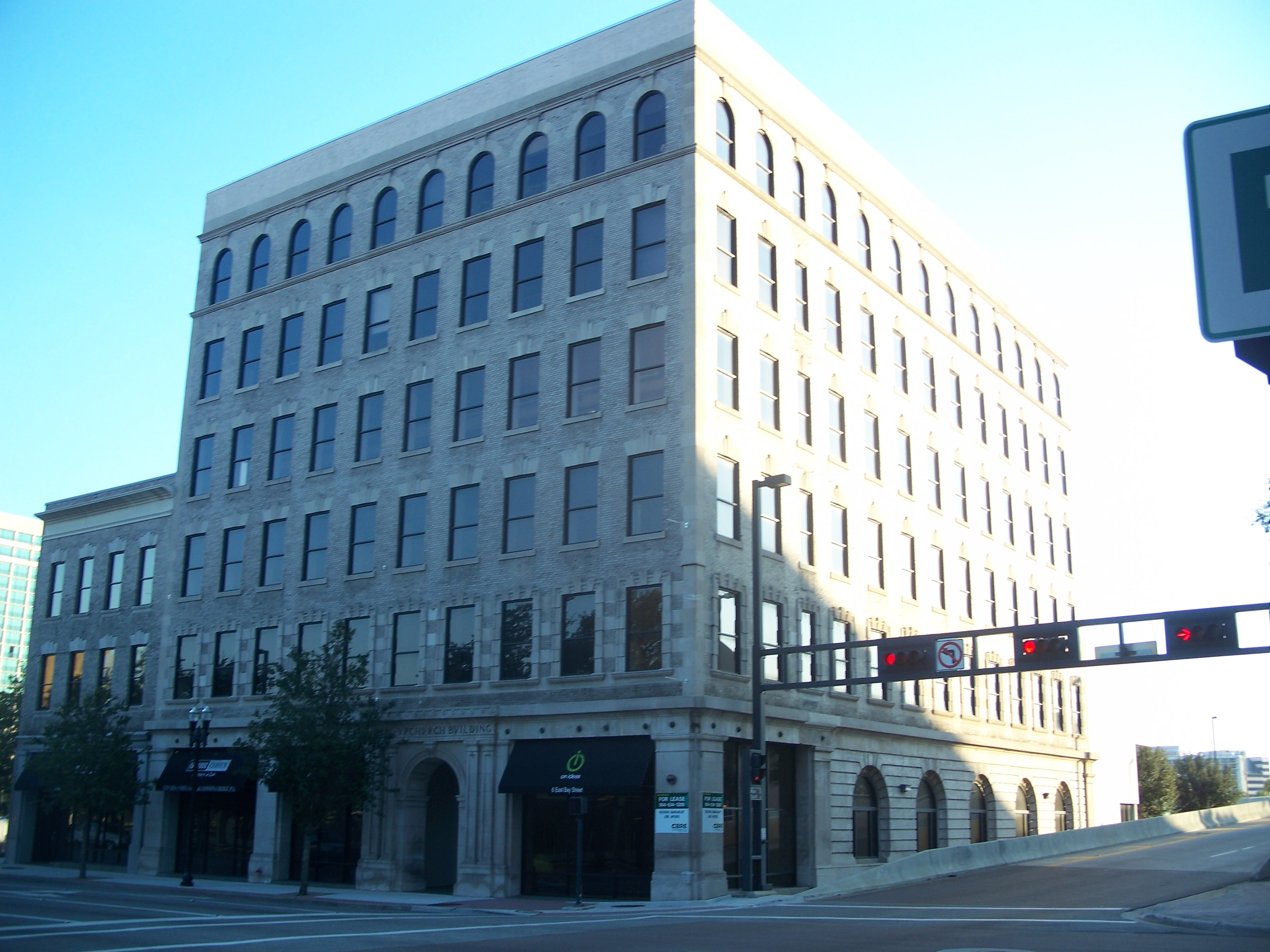

- Location within Florida Location within the United States
- Location: Jacksonville, Florida, USA
- Coordinates: 30°19′33″N 81°39′27″W
- Area: 43,747 ft
- Architect: Henry John Klutho
- Architectural style: Chicago school
- NRHP reference No.: 80000947
- Added to NRHP: April 17, 1980

The Dyal–Upchurch Building (also known as the Dyal–Upchurch Investment Company Building) is a six-story, 43,747-square-foot historic building in Jacksonville, Florida. It is located at 4 East Bay Street, and was designed by architect Henry John Klutho. On April 17, 1980, it was added to the U.S. National Register of Historic Places.

== History ==
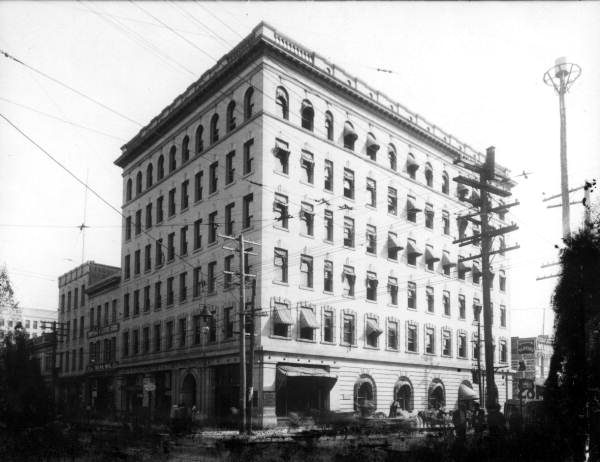
Dyal–Upchurch building in early 1900s.

Following Jacksonville's Great Fire of 1901, the building was the first multi-story structure built in the barren downtown area and the first design by Klutho in Jacksonville. Construction began on a five-story building, but demand for office space spurred the addition of a sixth floor. As the name states, Dyal–Upchurch was a Georgia investment company that moved to Jacksonville after the fire. Frank Upchurch had interests in turpentine and lumber, while Benjamin Dyal owned a sawmill. The company ceased business in Jacksonville after 1924.

The Atlantic National Bank was founded shortly after the Dyal–Upchurch building opened in May, 1902 and was located on the first floor until their own building was constructed in 1909. Other tenants have included an office of the National Weather Service, a regional office for the Connecticut General Life Insurance Company, law offices and a financial advice company.

Noted Florida author and folklorist Stetson Kennedy had his office here in the 1930s when he worked for the Federal Writers Project. He explained that the white staff members worked in the Dyal-Upchurch Building while the "Negro Unit" was based in the Clara White Mission in the LaVilla section of town.

When the building was added to the National Register of Historic Places in 1980, it became eligible to use rehabilitation tax credits when restoration work was performed in 1981, the first building in Jacksonville to do so.

The Husk Jennings advertising company bought the building in 1998 for $1.6 million and spent $600,000 to renovate the top floor, where the firm relocated.

In May, 2002, the city established the Downtown Historic Preservation and Revitalization Trust Fund with $7 million to assist companies that purchase and restore old buildings. The fund could pay up to half the cost of exterior work and one-fifth of interior work with a $1 million cap per building. That was sufficient incentive for Husk Jennings to begin a $1.72 million restoration of the rest of the building, for which the city kicked in almost $340,000.

Cameron Kuhn, a commercial developer from Orlando, Florida, purchased the building in December, 2005 for $4.5 million, but defaulted on the mortgage when his company declared bankruptcy in 2008. The Dyal–Upchurch building was repossessed by The Jacksonville Bank in January, and sold on February 28, 2009 for $3.73 million to A. Duda & Sons of Oviedo, Florida.

Records
| Preceded by Unknown | Tallest building in Jacksonville; 1902–1909; 25m | Succeeded by 121 Atlantic Place |
| Preceded by Unknown | Tallest building in Florida; 1902–1909; 25m | Succeeded by 121 Atlantic Place |
