= Great Fire of 1901 =

Fire that destroyed downtown Jacksonville, Florida

Coordinates: 30.3342°N 81.6674°W

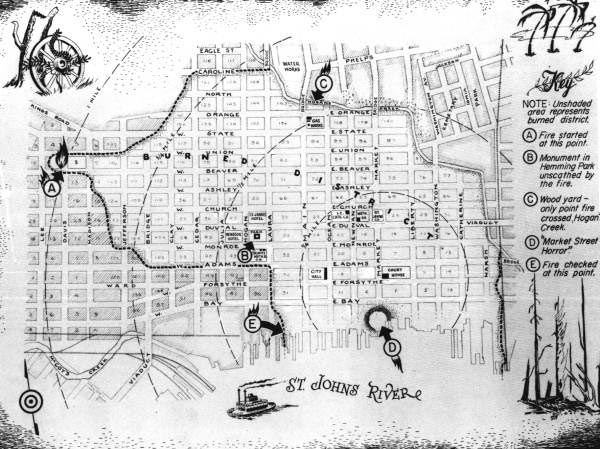
- Map of the Great Fire of 1901 that destroyed Downtown Jacksonville
- Date: May 3, 1901
- Location: Jacksonville, Florida
- Outcome: 2,367 structures destroyed 7 killed

The Great Fire of 1901 was a conflagration in Jacksonville, Florida, on May 3, 1901. It was one of the worst disasters in Florida history and the third largest urban fire in the U.S., after the Great Chicago Fire and the 1906 San Francisco fire.

== Fire ==
=== Origin ===
In 1901, Jacksonville consisted mainly of wooden buildings with wood shingled roofs. The city had been suffering a prolonged drought, leaving building exteriors across the city dry and fire-prone. At around noon on Friday, May 3, 1901, workers at the Cleaveland Fibre Factory, located on the corner of Beaver and Davis Streets, left for lunch. Several minutes later, sparks from the chimney of a nearby building started a fire in a pile of Spanish moss that was laid out to dry. First, factory workers tried to extinguish it with a few buckets of water, as they had frequently done on similar occasions. However, the blaze was soon out of control due to increased wind from the east. A brisk northwest wind fanned the flames, which "spread from house to house, seemingly with the rapidity that a man could walk".

Forsyth Street ruins.

In eight hours, the fire burned 146 city blocks; destroyed over 2,367 buildings, including the Afro-American Insurance Association, the first insurance company in the state; and left almost 10,000 residents homeless. It is said the glow from the flames could be seen in Savannah, Georgia, and the smoke plumes in Raleigh, North Carolina.

James Weldon Johnson, principal of a local school claimed, however, that firemen tried to save the fire from spreading to a white neighborhood, allowing black parts of town to burn down in the process:

"We met many people fleeing. From them we gathered excitedly related snatches: the fiber factory catches afire - the fire department comes - fanned by a light breeze, the fire is traveling directly east and spreading out to the north, over the district where the bulk of Negroes in the western end of the city live - the firemen spend all their efforts saving a low row of frame houses just across the street on the south side of the factory, belonging to a white man named Steve Melton."

=== Aftermath ===
Florida Governor William S. Jennings declared martial law in Jacksonville and dispatched several state militia units to help. Reconstruction began immediately, and the city was returned to civil authority on May 17. Seven deaths were reported. St. Andrew's Episcopal Church, built of bricks in 1887, was the only major church in the city to withstand the fire. The Duval County Courthouse and all its real estate records were destroyed. To this day real estate deeds in Duval County refer either to "the current public records of Duval County, Florida" or, if the records predate the fire, "the former public records of Duval County, Florida." It is the only county in Florida for which that is the case. The only existing pre-Fire real estate records are title abstracts saved by Title and Trust, a title company that still charges for their use.

=== Reconstruction ===
New York City architect Henry John Klutho helped rebuild the city. He and other architects, enamored by the "Prairie Style" of architecture then being popularized by architect Frank Lloyd Wright in Chicago and other Midwestern cities, designed exuberant local buildings with a Florida flair. Buildings designed by Klutho were Dyal-Upchurch Building (1902), Carnegie Library (1905), Bisbee Building (1909), Morocco Temple (1910), and the Florida Baptist Building (1924). While many of Klutho's buildings were demolished or abandoned by the 1980s, several of his creations remain, including his most prominent work, the St. James Building. The Jacksonville City Hall currently uses the St. James Building. Local charity Fresh Ministries recently restored the Klutho Apartments, in Springfield, and converted them into office space for the Community Development Corporation's Operation New Hope. Jacksonville has one of the largest collections of Prairie Style buildings (particularly residences) outside the Midwest.

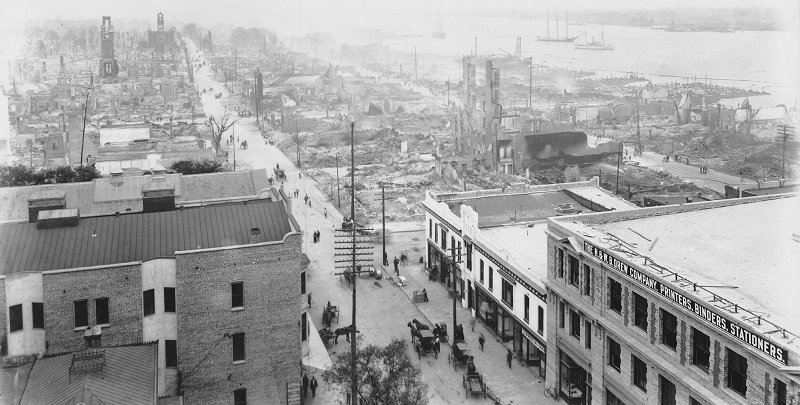
Bird's-eye view of the destruction left in the wake of the Great Fire of 1901

== See also ==
- Hotel Roosevelt fire: costly 1963 fire in downtown Jacksonville
- History of Jacksonville, Florida
- List of historic fires
