= Florida Baptist Building =

- U.S. National Register of Historic Places
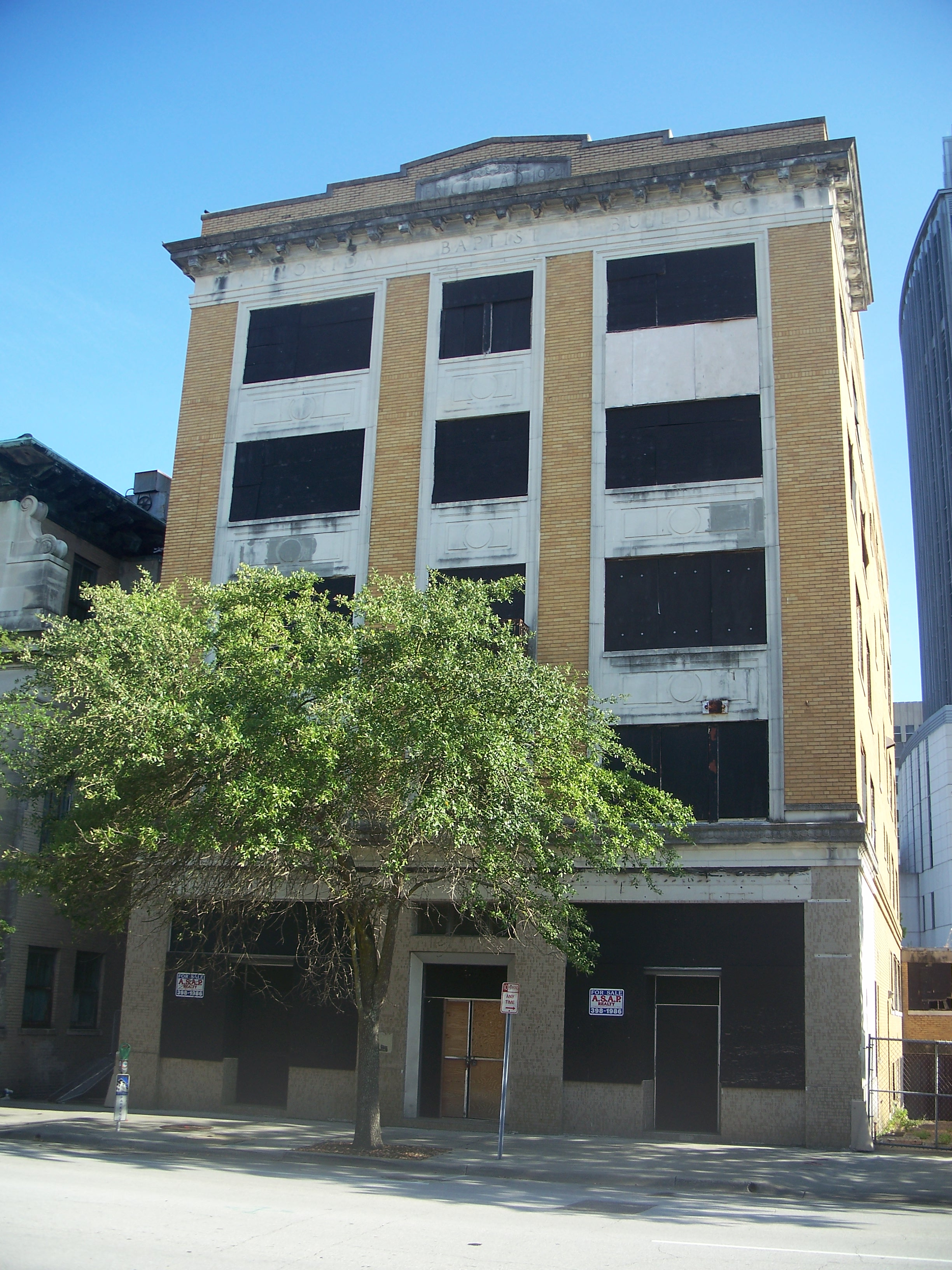

- Location within Florida Location within the United States
- Location: Jacksonville, Florida, United States
- Coordinates: 30°19′49″N 81°39′37″W
- Area: less than one acre
- Built: 1924-25
- Architect: Henry John Klutho
- Architectural style: Commercial
- NRHP reference No.: 84000844
- Added to NRHP: January 12, 1984

The Florida Baptist Building (also known as the Rogers Building) is a historic building in Jacksonville, Florida. It is located at 218 West Church Street, and was designed by New York City architect Henry John Klutho. On January 12, 1984, it was added to the U.S. National Register of Historic Places.
