= St. James Building =

Historic place in Florida, United States

- U.S. National Register of Historic Places
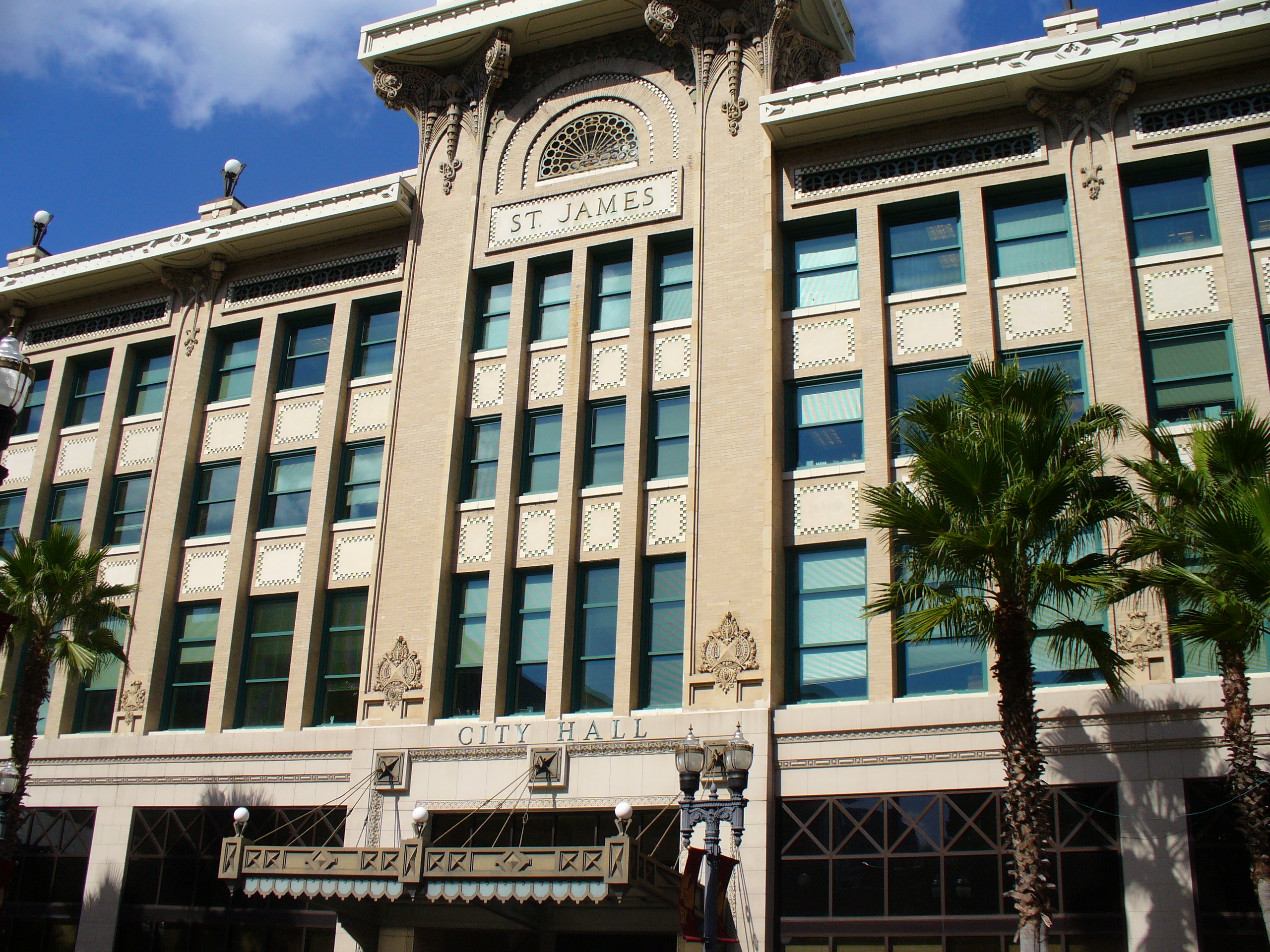

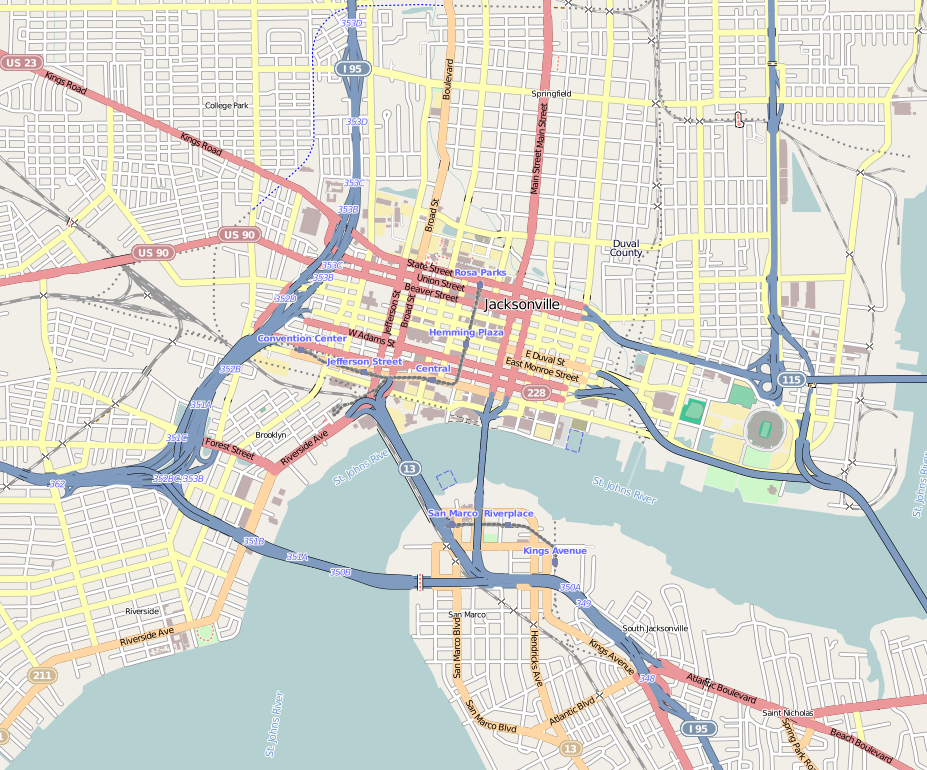
- Location within Central Jacksonville Location within Florida
- Location: 117 West Duval Street; Jacksonville, Florida, United States
- Coordinates: 30°19′48″N 81°39′34″W
- Built: 1912; 114 years ago
- Architect: Henry John Klutho
- Architectural style: Chicago School; Prairie School
- NRHP reference No.: 76000594
- Added to NRHP: May 3, 1976

The St. James Building is a historic building in Downtown Jacksonville, Florida, currently housing Jacksonville City Hall. It was designed by architect Henry John Klutho and opened in 1912. One of many structures in downtown Jacksonville designed by Klutho after the Great Fire of 1901, it is considered his Prairie School masterpiece.

The building is located at 117 West Duval Street, on the former site of the St. James Hotel. It was designed as a mixed-use building containing the Cohen Bros. Department Store (later May Cohens). The department store closed in 1987, leaving the building empty. In 1993 it was purchased by the City of Jacksonville under the River City Renaissance plan, with the intention of remodeling it as the new City Hall. It reopened in 1997. On April 18, 2012, the American Institute of Architects's Florida Chapter placed the building on its list of Florida Architecture: 100 Years. 100 Places.

== History ==
=== St. James Hotel ===
The original St. James Building was a hotel constructed and owned by investors from Connecticut following the American Civil War. In addition to lodging for 500 guests, it boasted a passenger elevator and a restaurant with excellent cuisine. The facility included a laundry, barbershop, wine room, telegraph office and reading rooms. Touring orchestras performed concerts for the guests, who included society people, celebrities and the rich. At the peak of Jacksonville's popularity, 65,000 people spent the winter in north Florida. The hotel was so prominent that the public square across the street, known as "City Park", was changed to "St. James Park".

Jacksonville's Great Fire of 1901 destroyed most of the city, including the original St. James. The owner of the St. James property, J. R. Campbell, wanted to rebuild, but did not have the resources. The Windsor Hotel, located adjacent to the St. James, quickly rebuilt and was able to purchase the St. James land from the cash-strapped Campbell to prevent a competing hotel from being built downtown. Jacob and Morris Cohen purchased the St. James property from the Windsor after agreeing not to build a hotel.

=== Cohen Brothers' Department Store ===
In March 1910, Klutho agreed to design a building commissioned by Jacob Elias Cohen for the Cohen Brothers' department store. Among the proposals sent to the Cohens was a striking design for a building with four floors, twice what had been requested. Klutho proposed a "mixed use" design that would contain small shops on the first floor exterior with the department store in the interior and on the second floor. The third and fourth floors would contain offices for rent. He convinced the brothers that their structure would become the center of commerce for Jacksonville and they embraced his idea.

Klutho not only designed the building, but acted as construction manager using the fast-track method, whereby work begins prior to design completion. The project was finished in less than a year and a half, using 200 skilled tradesmen. The structure was named the St. James Building, and it was Klutho's crowning achievement. When dedicated on October 21, 1912, it was the largest structure in Jacksonville, occupying an entire city block. The St. James Building was the featured article in The Western Architect and Klutho's work was highlighted throughout the magazine in June 1914.

The most striking interior feature was a 75 ft octagonal glass dome, which served as a skylight. The elevators were open "cages", giving passengers a view of the store. The building exterior was decorated with large abstract terra-cotta ornaments.

The Cohen brothers operated their store until The May Department Stores Company purchased it in 1958, renaming it May Cohens. Four other May Cohen stores were opened at shopping centers around town and the downtown store in the St. James Building was closed in July 1987.

=== City Hall ===
The city of Jacksonville purchased the building in 1993 as part of the River City Renaissance, a plan put forward by Mayor Ed Austin that included $24 million to purchase and restore the St. James as the new city hall. The goal was to relocate government offices to the center of downtown, all around Hemming Plaza.

Saxelbye, Powell, Roberts & Ponder Architects were chosen for what was more of a restoration than renovation. Demolition of all interior walls and partitions was required to remove the effects of prior renovations. A 75 ft octagonal glass dome was reconstructed after it was removed in early 1927 to build more rentable space, much to the disgust of Klutho, who commented that "a showplace was killed" and moved his offices out of the building in protest. In the 1990s restoration, the major change from the original design was the dome, which was mounted on the roof of the fourth floor, instead of between the second and third floors. An infrastructure upgrade was required to meet current building codes, handicap-accessibility requirements and be energy efficient. The new City Hall in the St. James Building opened on December 12, 1997. The Jacksonville Historical Society described the St. James Building as "one of Jacksonville's most monumental works of art (and) one of the most beautiful city halls in America".

== Gallery ==
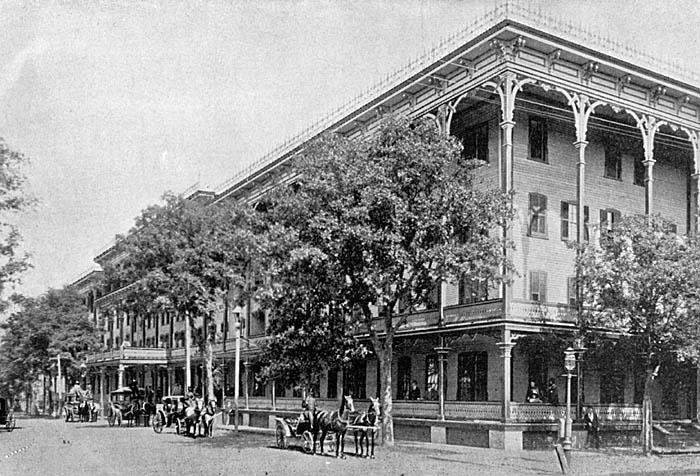
St. James Hotel ca. 1893

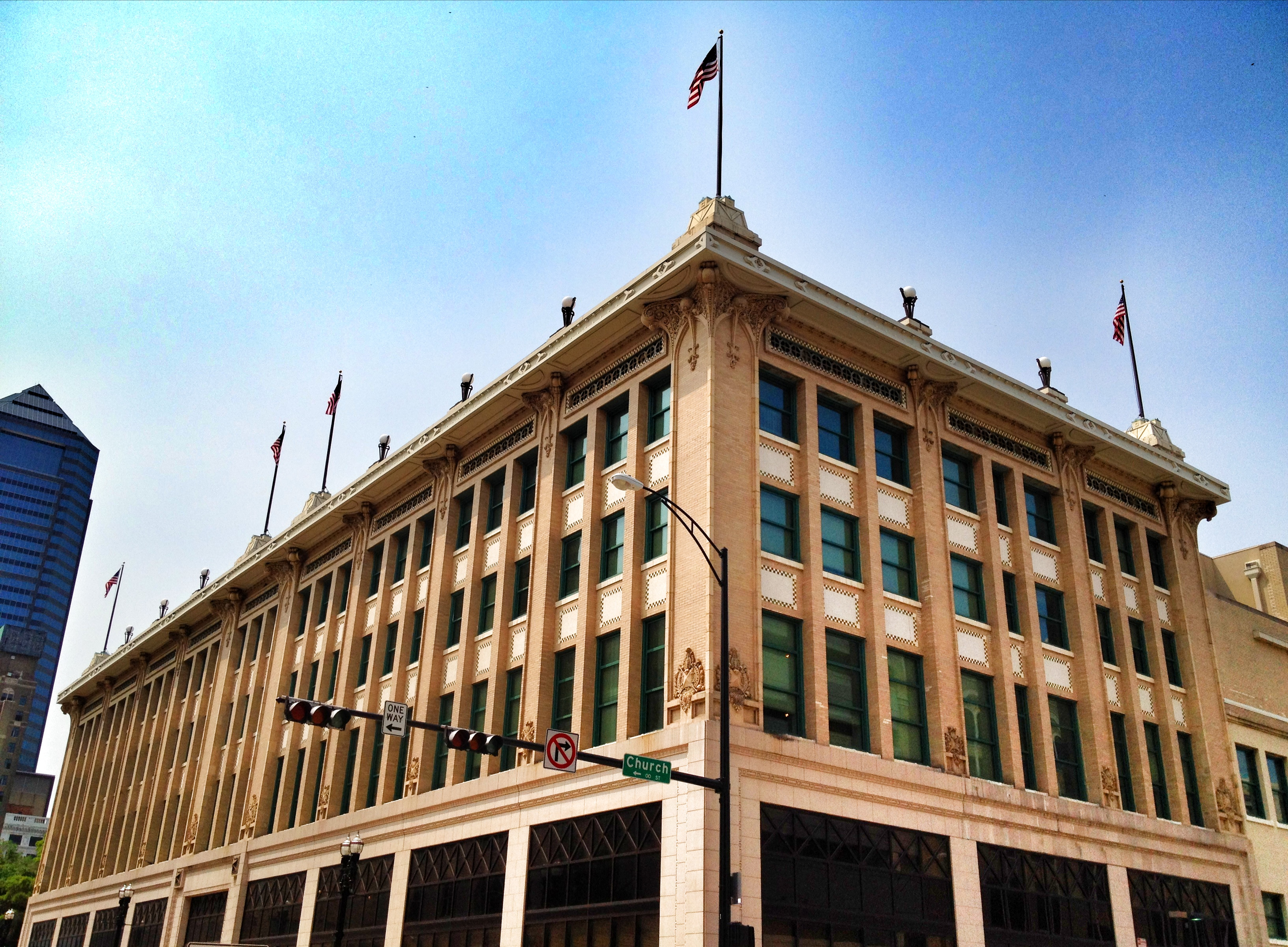
City Hall, 2012

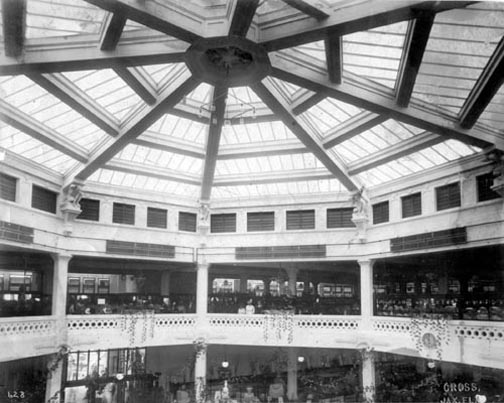
Octagonal, 75 ft glass dome ca. 1912

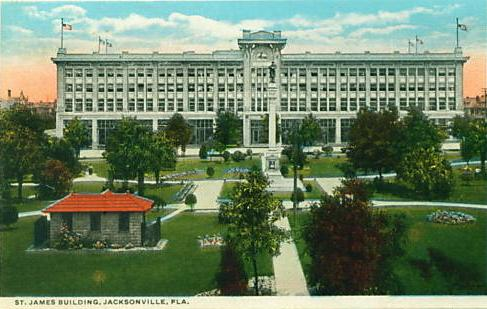
St. James Building postcard ca. 1915

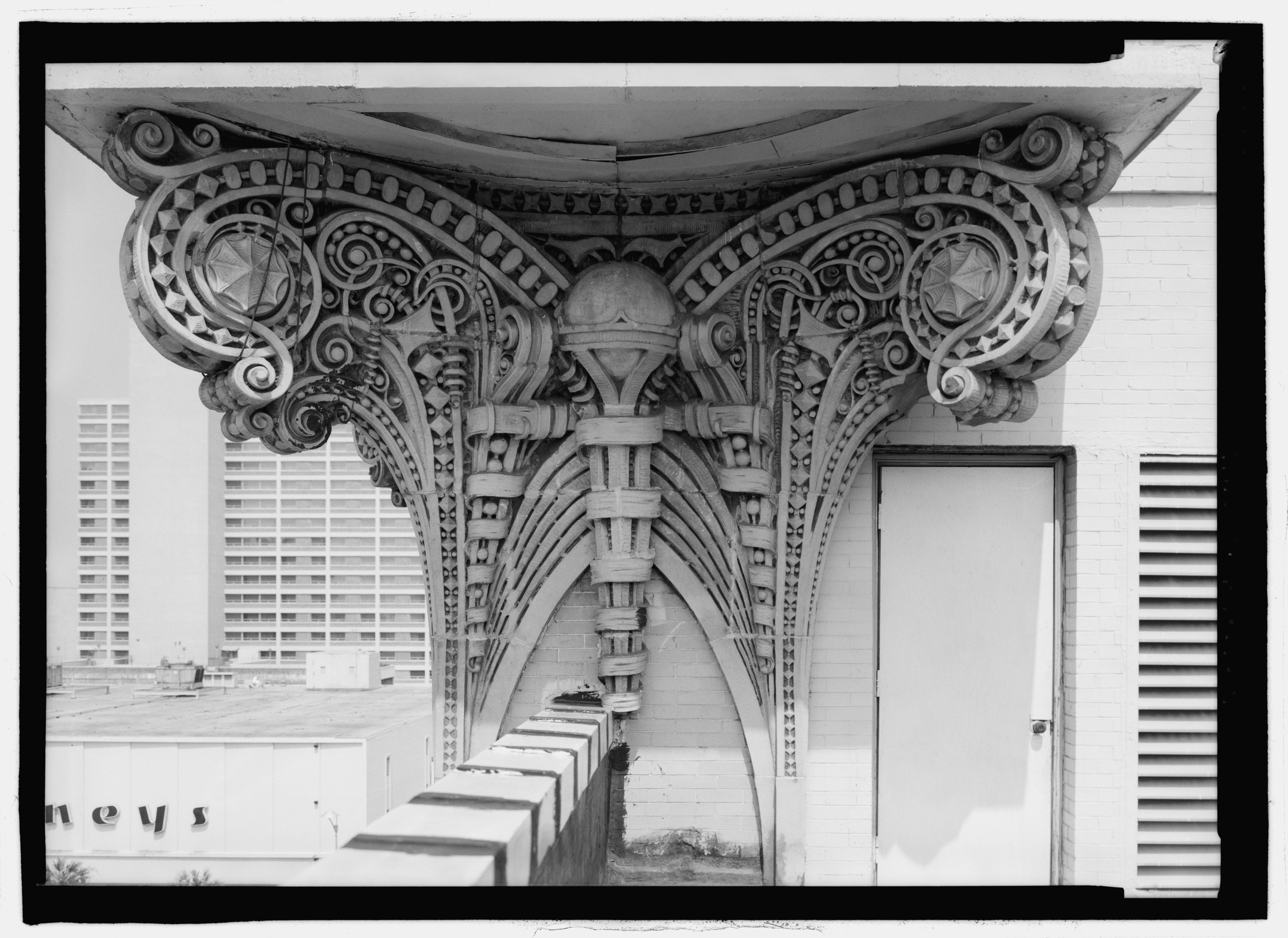
Detail of pilaster capital

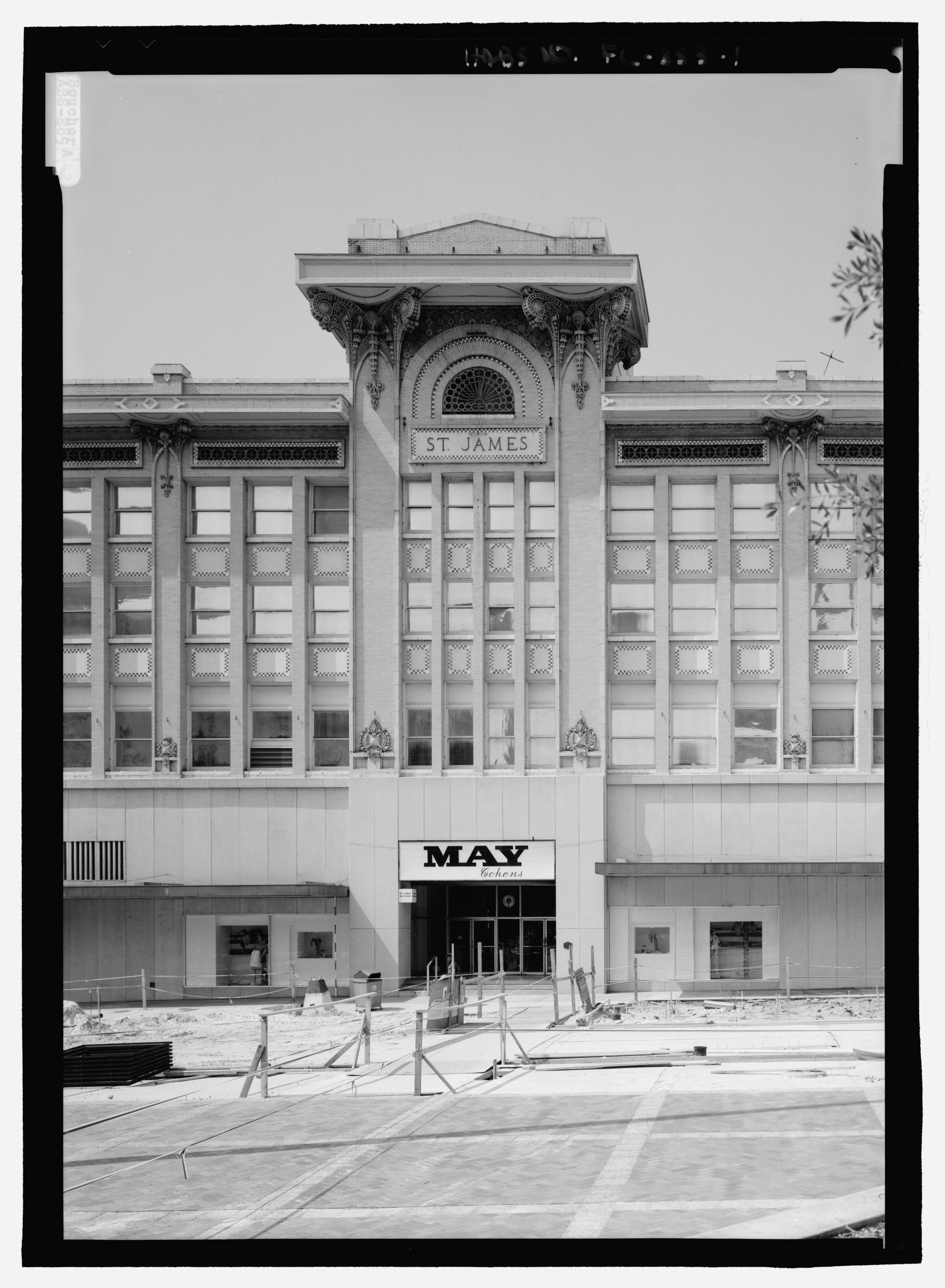
Entrance of May Cohan

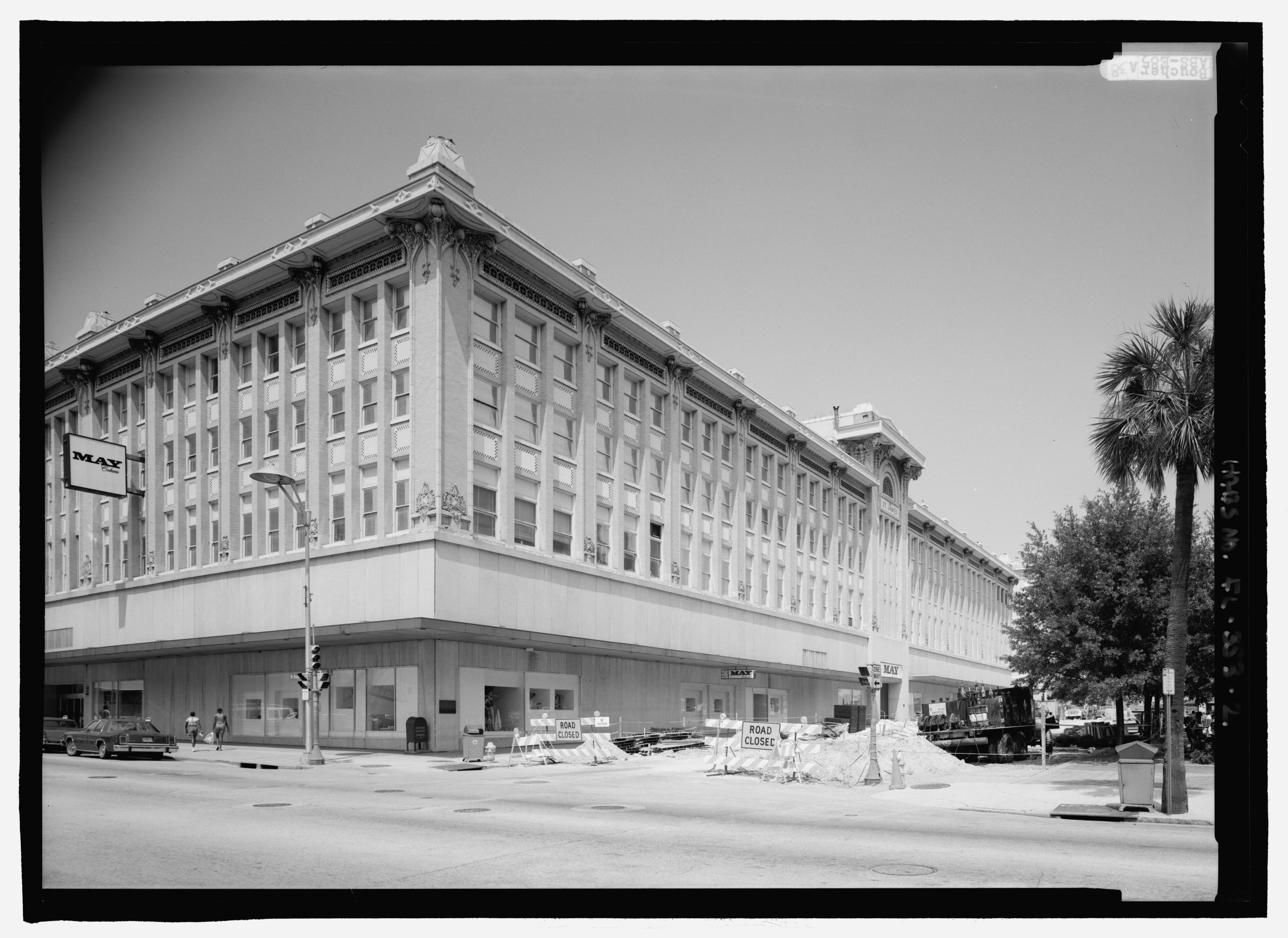

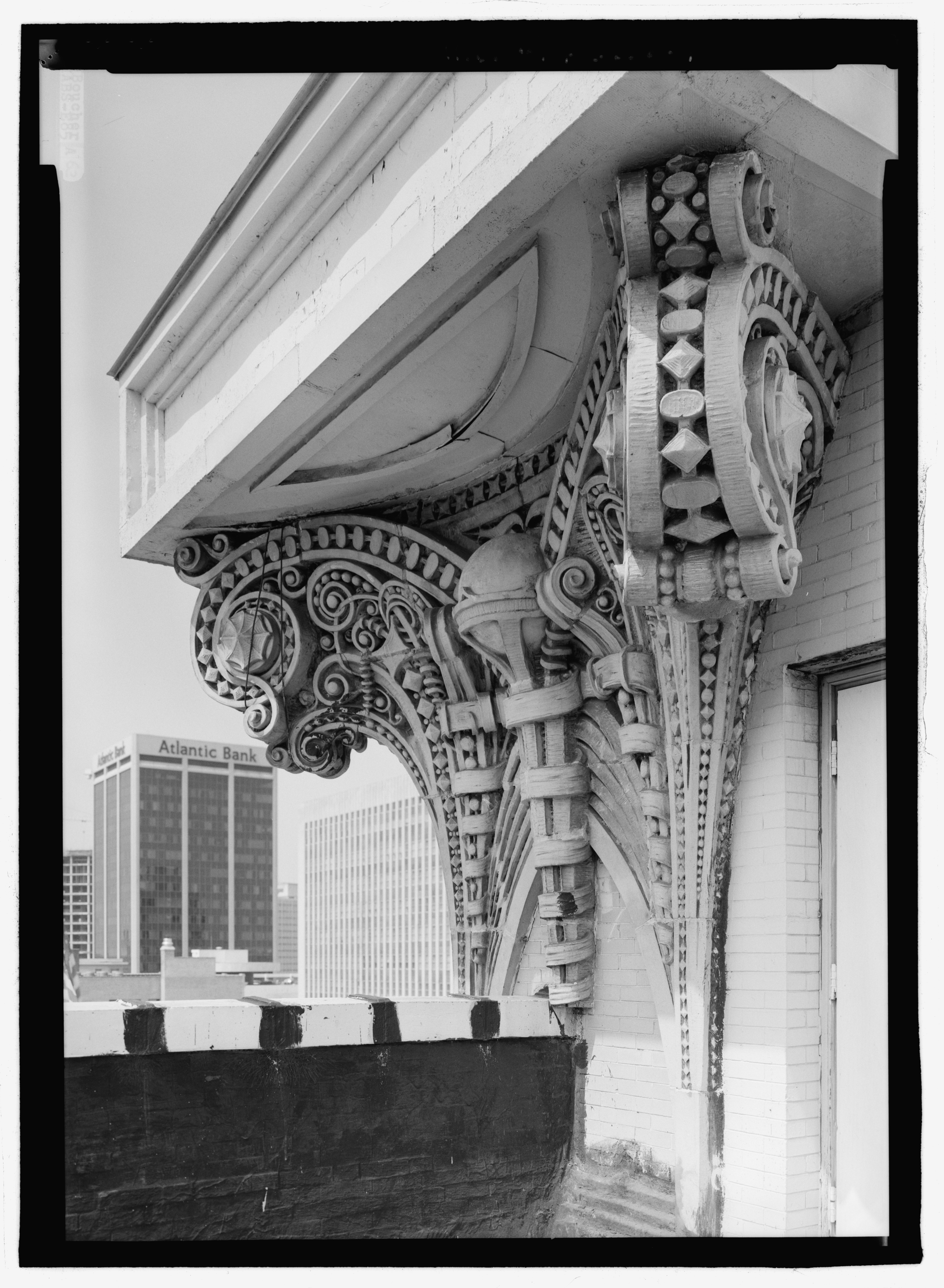

== See also ==
- Architecture of Jacksonville
