= Henry John Klutho =

American architect (1873–1964)

- Henry John Klutho, ca. early 1900s
- Born: 19 March 1873; Breese, Illinois
- Died: 1964 (aged 90–91); Jacksonville, Florida
- Occupation: Architect
- Buildings: St. James Building, Dyal-Upchurch Building, Old Jacksonville Free Public Library

Henry John Klutho (19 March 1873–1964) was an American architect known for his work in the "Prairie School" style. He helped in the reconstruction of Jacksonville, Florida after the Great Fire of 1901—the largest-ever urban fire in the Southeast—by designing many of the new buildings built after the disaster. This period lasted until the beginning of World War I. Several Jacksonville architects began their careers in the offices of Klutho's firm.

== Early life ==
Klutho was born on 19 March 1873, in Breese, Illinois, a small Midwestern town. He was the son of Theo and Moliter Klutho. His German grandparents had immigrated to the United States in 1840, landing in New Orleans and moving to southern Illinois, where they bought land from the government. Theo Klutho became a lumber dealer and a landowner of substance. The family was Roman Catholic, and Henry John attended parochial schools for his elementary education. He lived in Breese until the age of 16, when he left home for St. Louis, Missouri to study business at Commercial College, where for a year and a half he took classes in business. Finding artistic pursuits more to his liking, he developed an interest in architecture and attended Schenke's Drawing Academy for a year to develop drafting skills. He then trained with architects in the city for three years to gain work experience. In 1898 he left to travel in Europe, where he studied and sketched the architectural masterpieces of Beaux-Arts architecture before moving to New York City in 1899 and opening an office.

== Work ==
Little is known of Klutho's work during the period from the setting-up of his architectural practice in New York in 1899 until his leaving the city in 1901. It was probably traditional and well-designed like his earliest known design, for a Catholic cathedral built in Newark, New Jersey.

On May 3, 1901, a small fire had started in a LaVilla mattress factory in Jacksonville, Florida's most populated city, and in just over eight hours swept through 146 city blocks. It destroyed over 2,000 buildings, killed seven people, and left almost 9,000 residents homeless. Klutho read about the Great Fire of 1901 in the New York Times and recognized the opportunity of a lifetime. He finished his current projects in New York and moved to Jacksonville to help rebuild the city. The subsequent rebuilding of downtown Jacksonville in the aftermath of the Great Fire introduced Modern architecture to Florida. Klutho was among those who helped design the Windsor Hotel.

To establish his credentials in the community, Klutho entered into a brief association as a junior partner with the architect J. W. Golucke of Atlanta and introduced himself to local business leaders. The first commission won by the firm of Golucke and Klutho was the six-story Dyal–Upchurch Building on the southeast corner of Main and Bay streets. The Dyal-Upchurch Company, previously of Moniac, Georgia, and headed by the recently arrived Frank Upchurch, had bought the property in July 1901. Constructed on 30-foot wooden pilings sunk into the riverbed, the building, which housed the Atlantic National Bank, stores, and offices, was built at a cost of $75,000, and was the first large structure constructed in the barren downtown area after the fire. Other projects soon followed, including the new City Hall and private homes.

During a business trip to New York City in 1905, Klutho met Frank Lloyd Wright, and the event changed Klutho's life. Wright and other Chicago area architects had originated a new American style of architecture that became known as the "Prairie School", which discarded traditional European features of building design, such as Roman arches and Greek columns. The new style appealed to Klutho, who adapted his own style to accommodate Wright's ideas.

Klutho and other architects in the city enamored of Prairie School architecture designed local buildings with an exuberant Florida flair. Between 1907 and the start of World War I, Klutho was commissioned to design dozens of buildings, including the Morocco Temple, the Seminole Hotel, the Florida Life Building, the Bisbee Building, and the YMCA. In what is now the Springfield Historic District, he drew plans for the Klutho Apartments, the Claude Nolan Cadillac Building, the Florence Court Apartments and his own home. He also was involved in the design of buildings in the Avondale and Riverside neighborhoods.

In March 1910, Klutho agreed to design a building for Jacob and Morris Cohen's department store, to be named the St. James Building. Among the proposals sent to the Cohens was a striking design for a building with four floors, twice what had been requested. Klutho proposed a "mixed use" design that would contain small shops on the first floor exterior with the department store in the interior and on the second floor. The third and fourth floors would contain offices for rent. He convinced the brothers that their structure would become the center of commerce for Jacksonville, and they embraced his idea.

Klutho not only designed the building but also acted as construction manager using the fast-track method, whereby work begins prior to design completion. Remarkably, the project was finished in less than a year and a half. The structure was named the St. James Building, and it was Klutho's crowning achievement. When dedicated on October 21, 1912, it was the largest structure in Jacksonville, occupying an entire city block. The St. James Building was the featured article in The Western Architect and Klutho's work was highlighted throughout the magazine in June 1914. The most striking interior feature was a 75-foot octagonal glass dome, which served as a skylight. The elevators were open "cages", giving passengers a view of the store. The building exterior was decorated with large abstract terra-cotta ornaments. The former department store is now Jacksonville's City Hall.

Later generations in Jacksonville did not appreciate the creativity and style of his designs. His contributions to the rebirth of the city were mostly ignored, except by his colleagues. Regarding this fact, he quoted Desiderius Erasmus: "In the land of the blind, a one-eyed man is king." Klutho lived to be 91, but had little money, making his later years difficult. Following his death, much of his work was razed or "renovated". In the mid-1970s, a number of his creations were added to the National Register of Historic Places, assuring their preservation. The Morocco Temple and the St. James Building still stand, and the Klutho Apartments in Springfield were recently restored and converted into office space by the local Episcopalian charity, Fresh Ministries. Despite losses over the years, Jacksonville still has one of the largest collections of Prairie Style buildings (particularly residences) outside the Midwest. The Jacksonville Historical Society takes special interest in his work:

- Dyal–Upchurch Building
- Florida Baptist Building
- Old Jacksonville Free Public Library (a/k/a Carnegie Library)
- Larimer Memorial Library
- Morocco Temple
- St. James Building (now the Jacksonville City Hall)
- Thomas V. Porter House
- Alexander St. Clair-Abrams House
- Henry John Klutho House the architect's residence
- Bisbee Building
- Florida Life Building
- Hotel James in Palatka

== Gallery ==
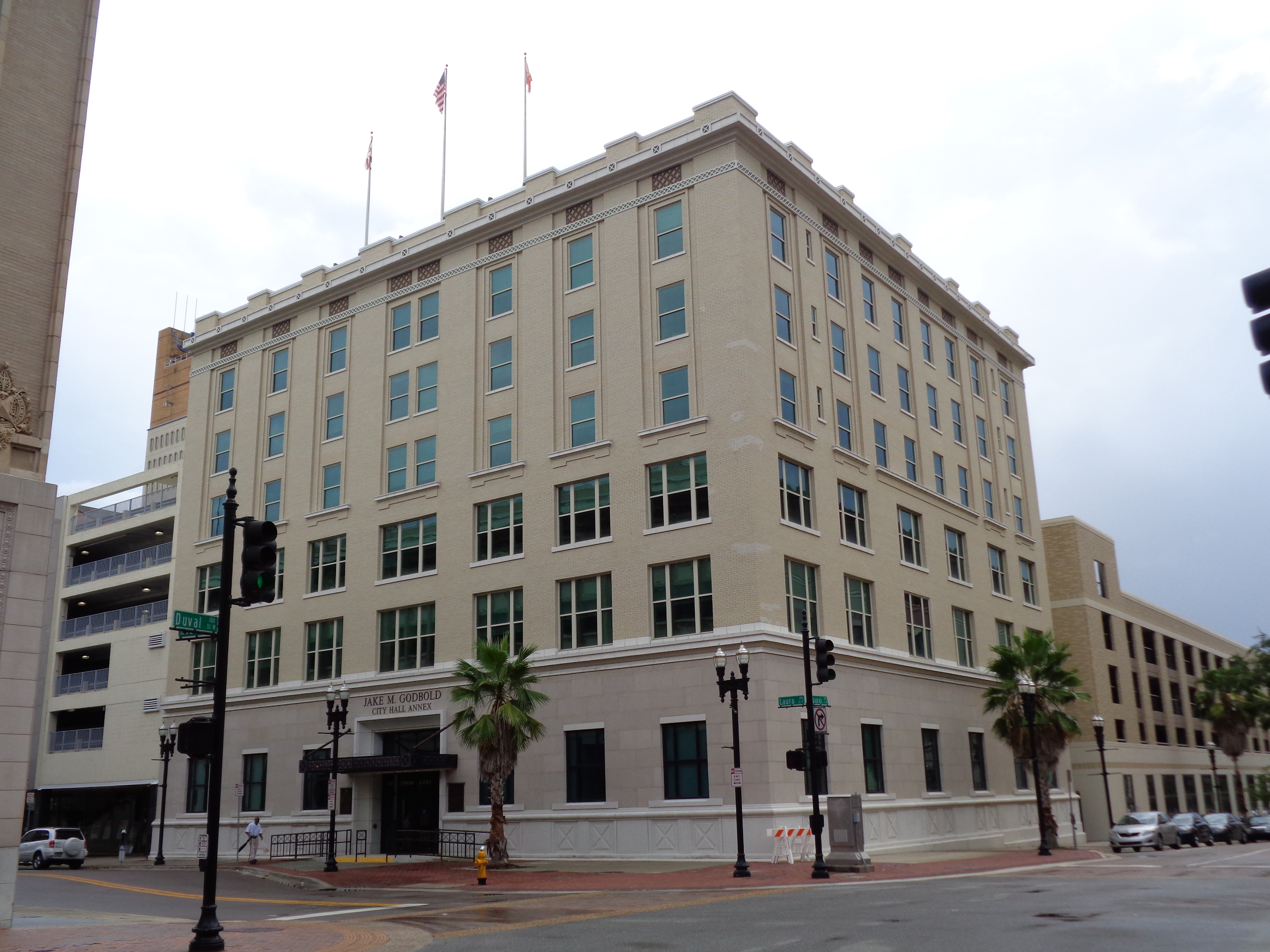
Old YMCA building

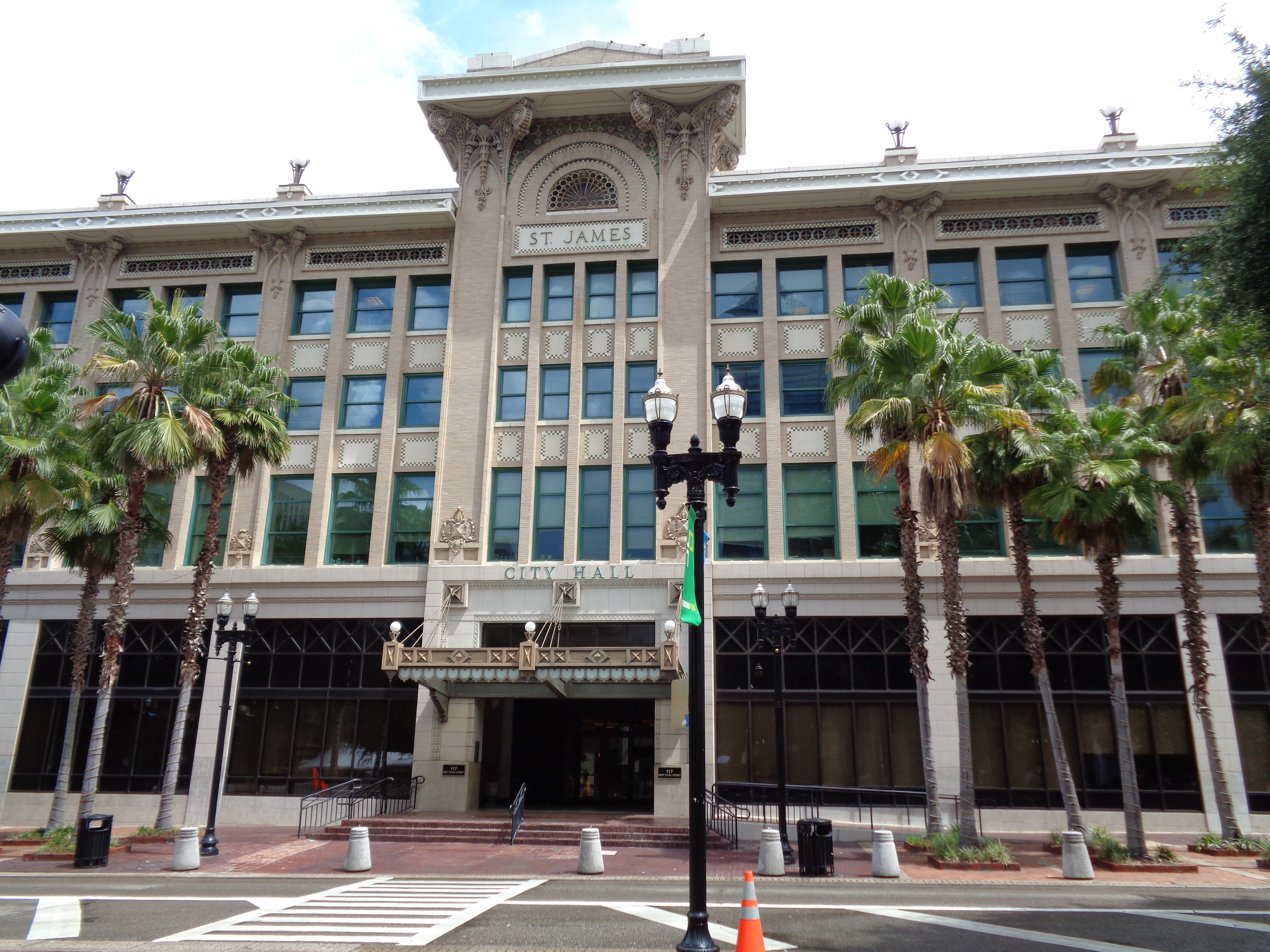
St. James Building

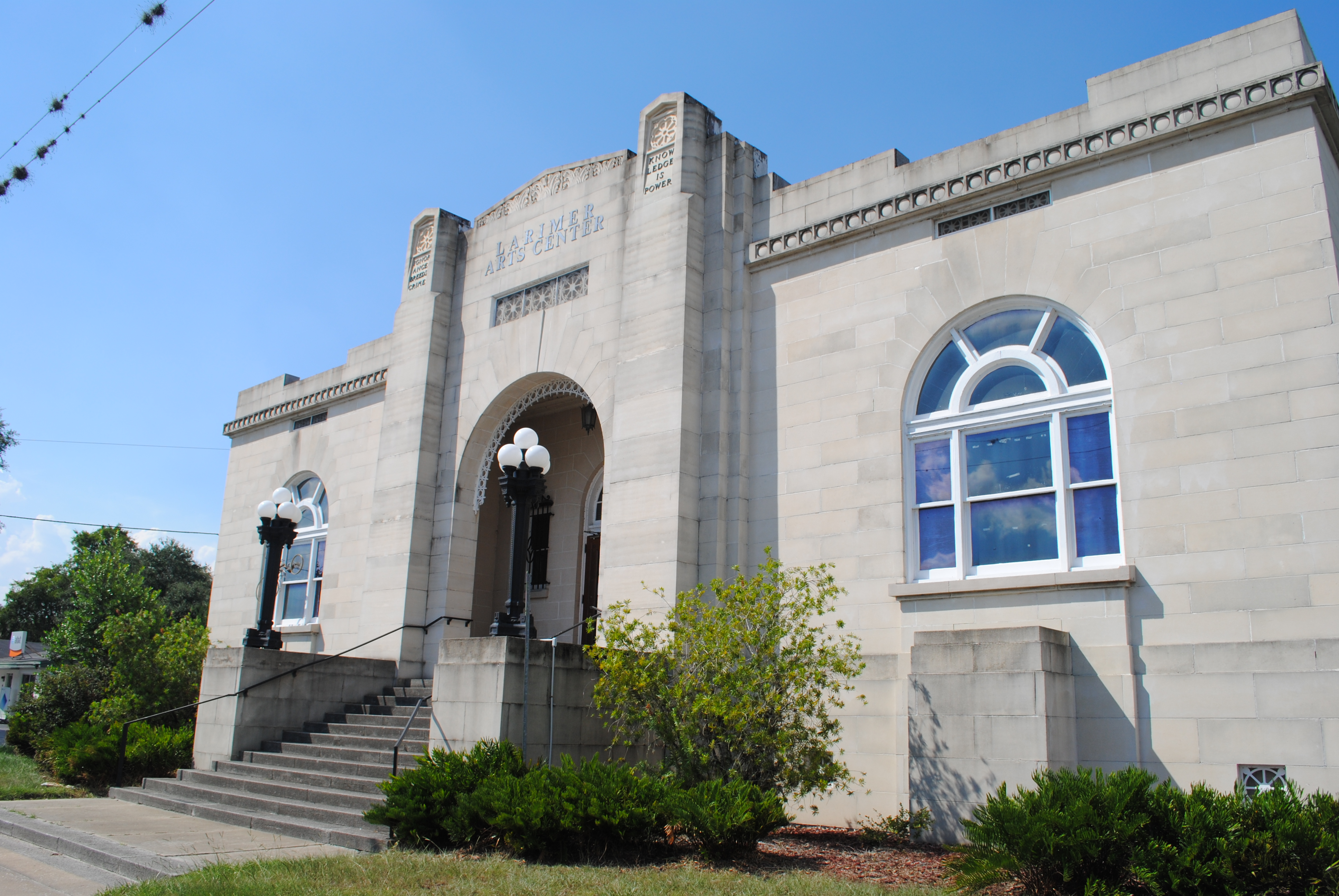
Old Larimer Library, in Palatka

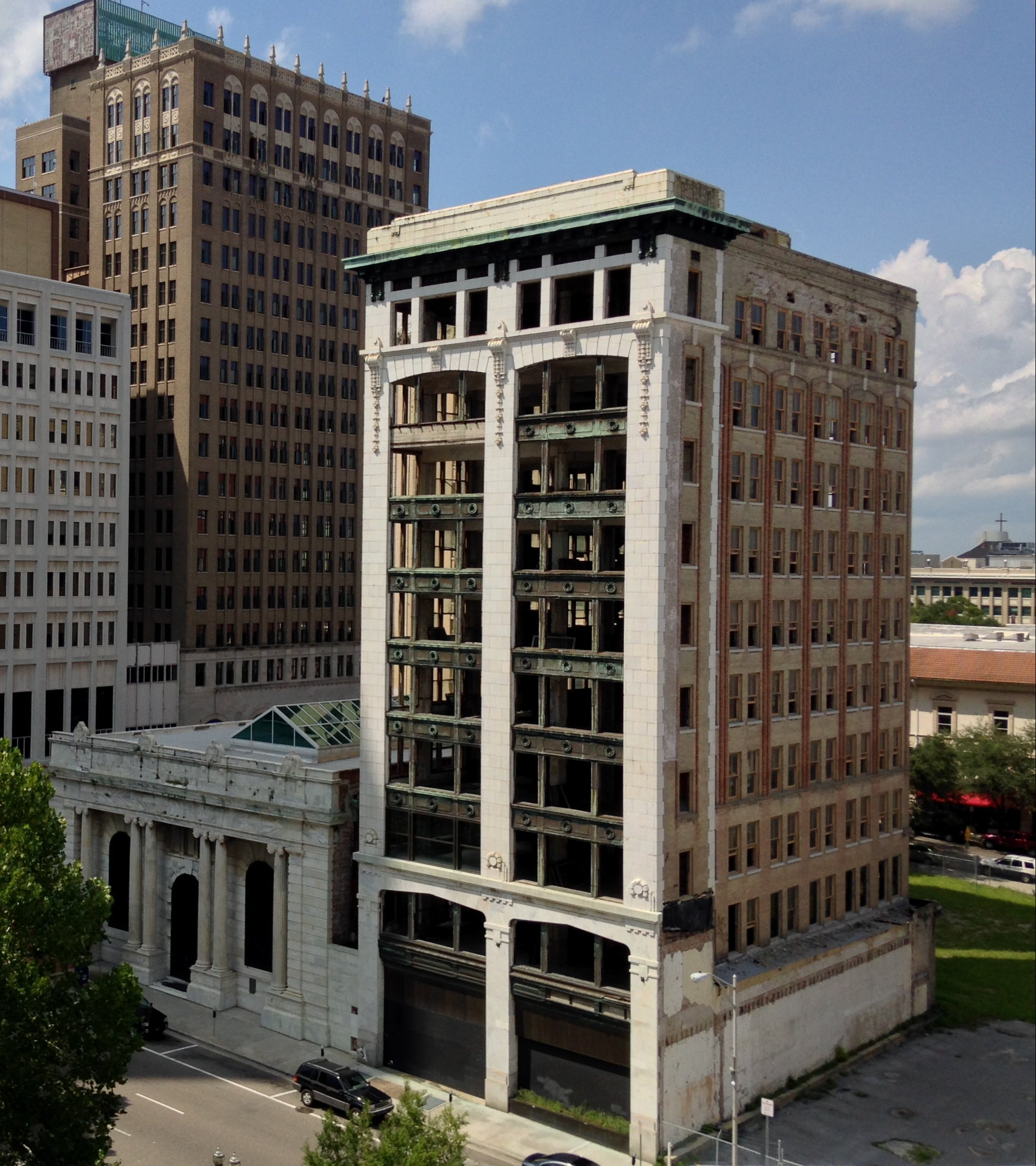
Bisbee Building

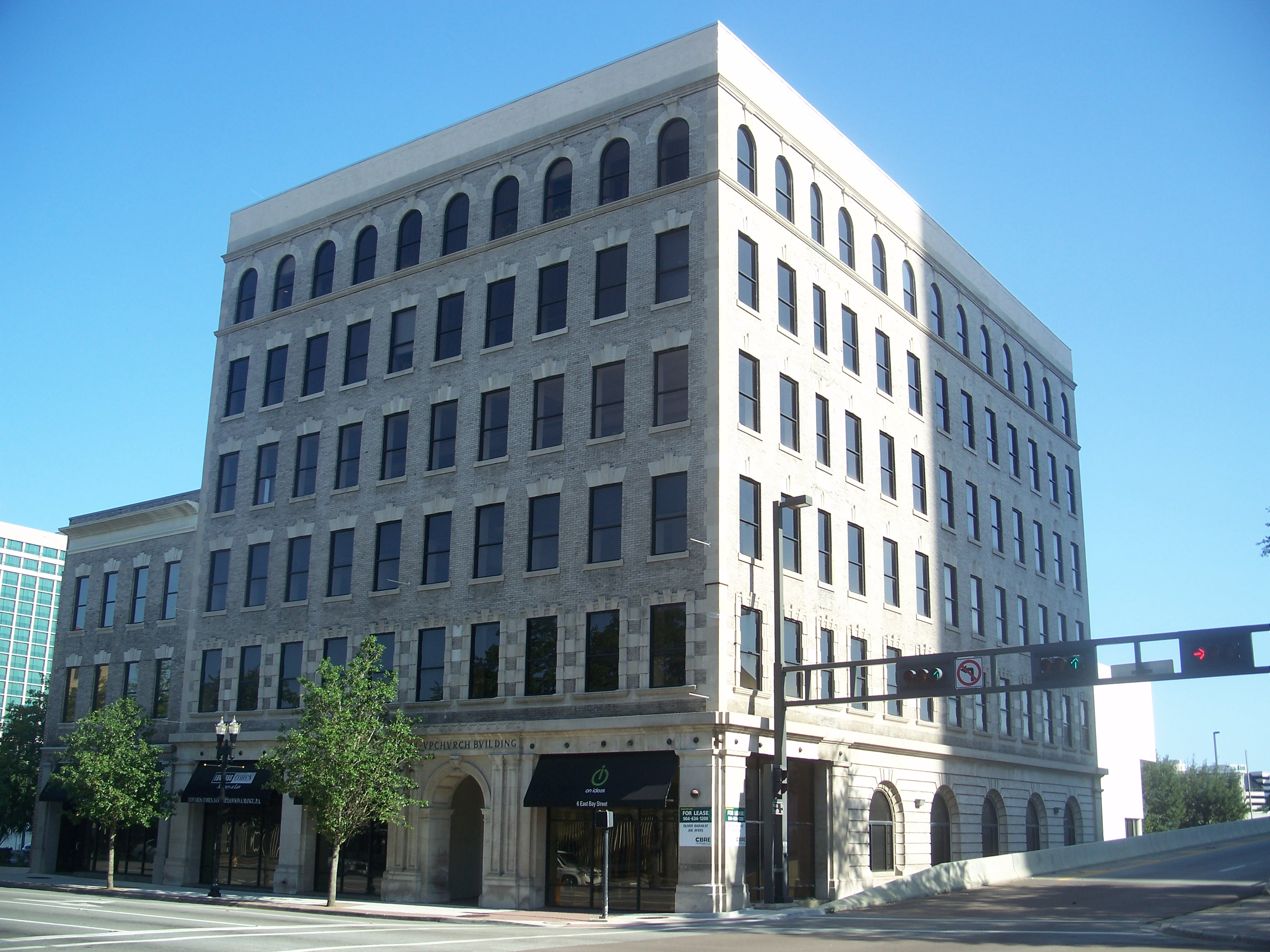
Dyal–Upchurch Building

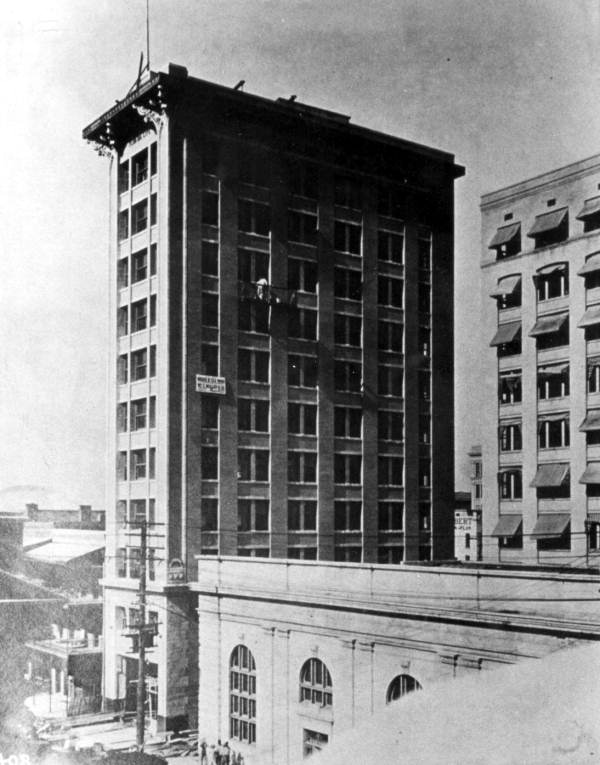
Florida Life Building

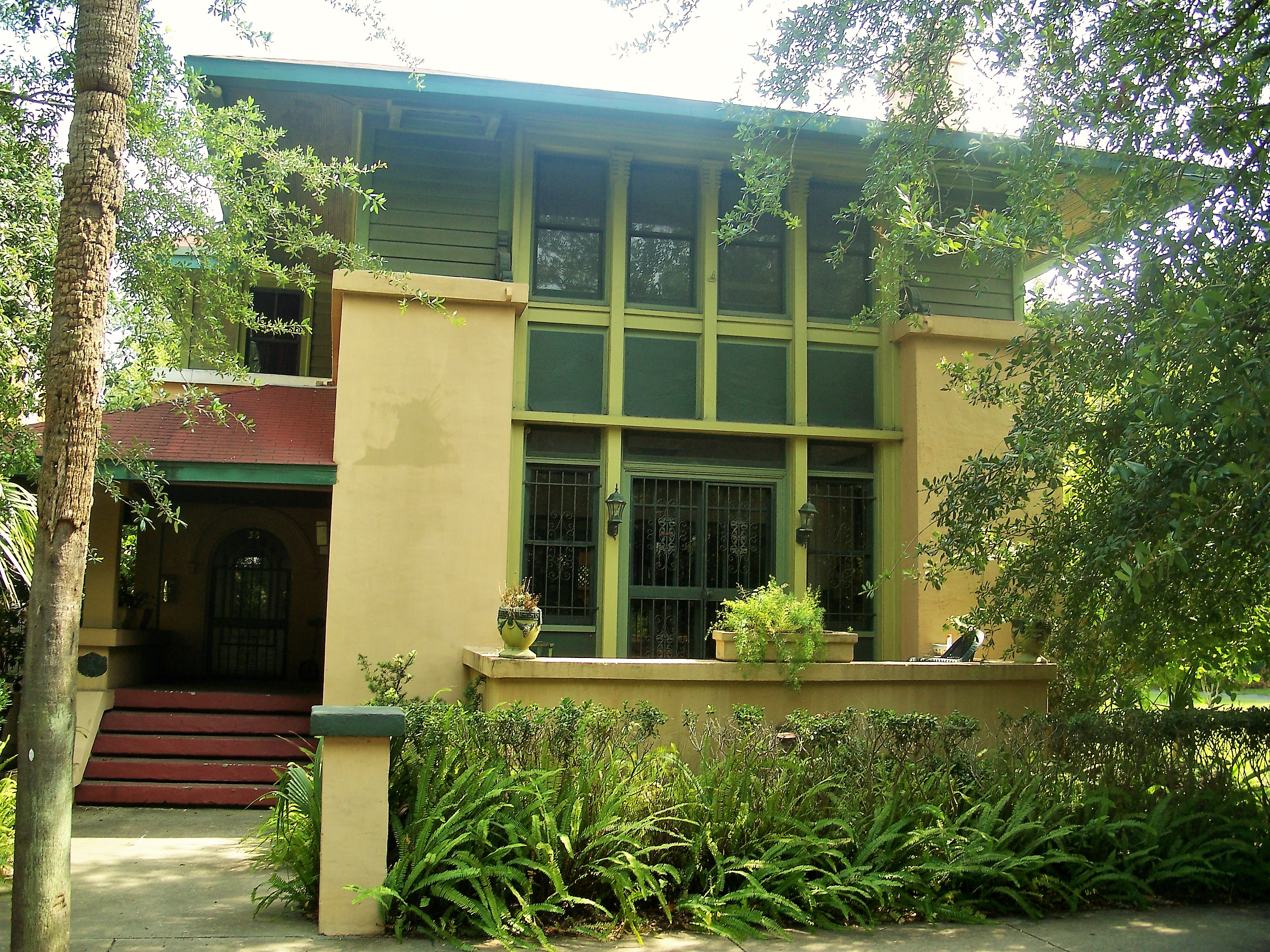
Klutho House

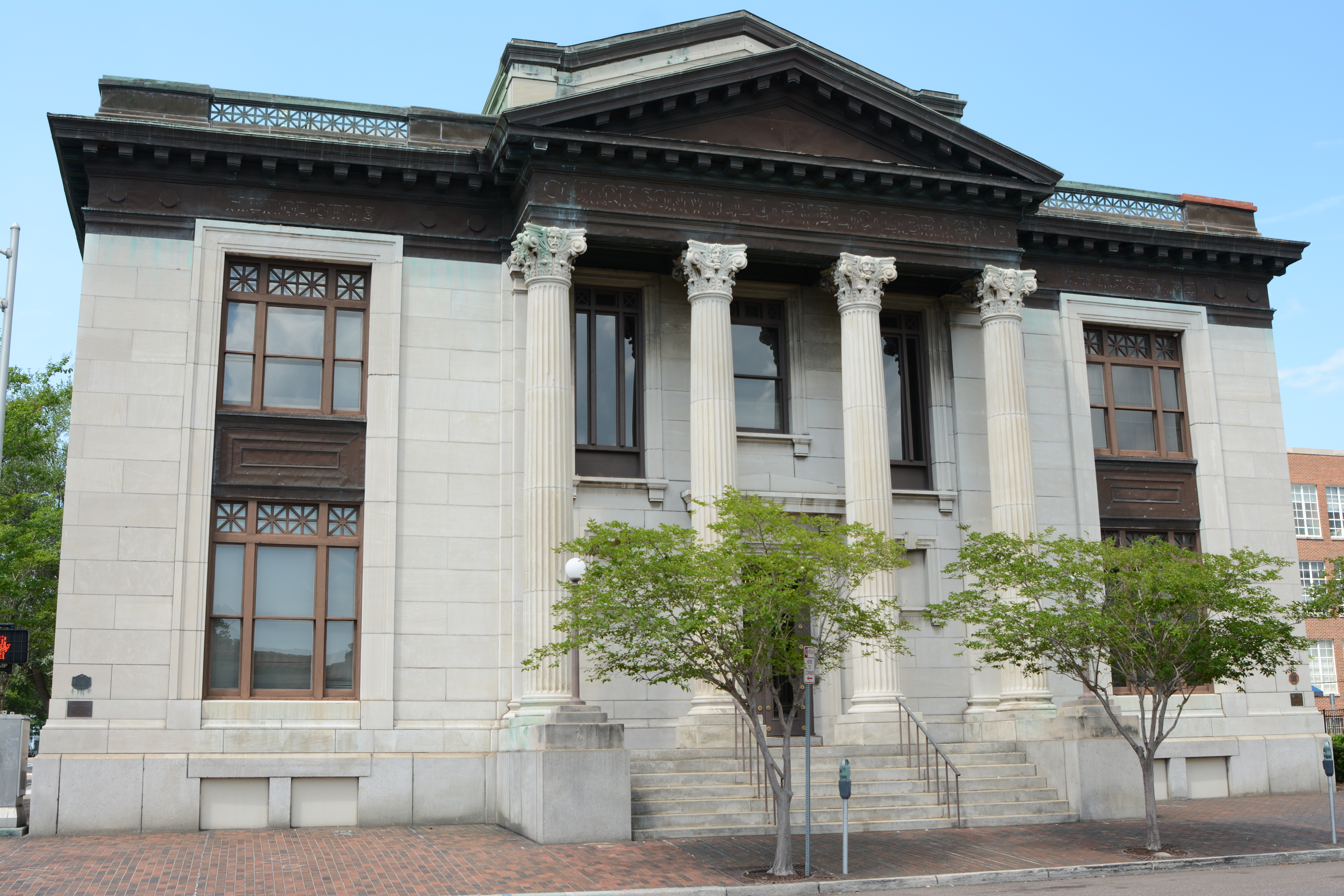
Old Jacksonville Free Public Library

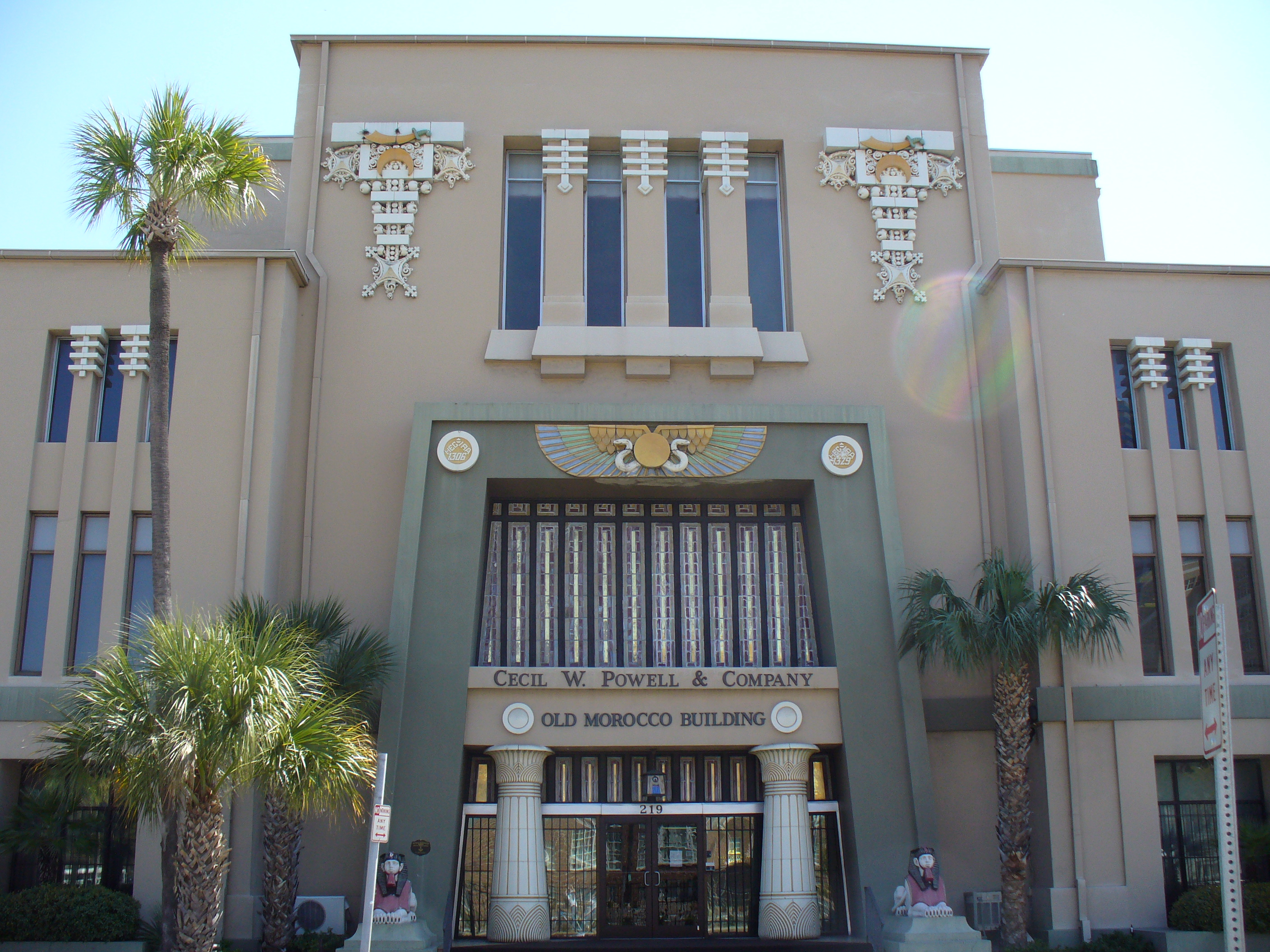
Morocco Temple, Jacksonville

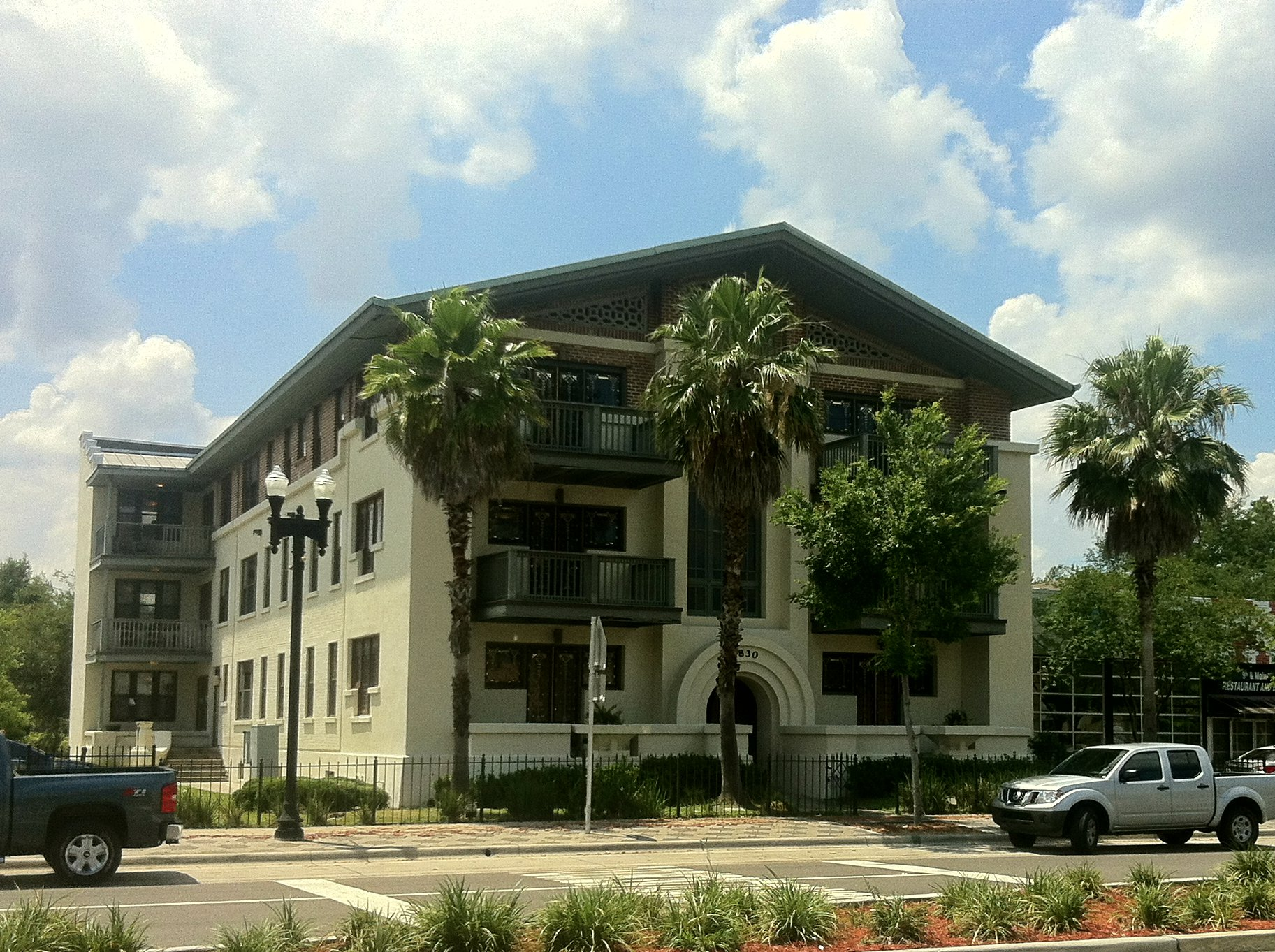
Klutho Apartments on Main Street

== See also ==
- Architecture of Jacksonville
