= Morocco Temple =

- U.S. National Register of Historic Places
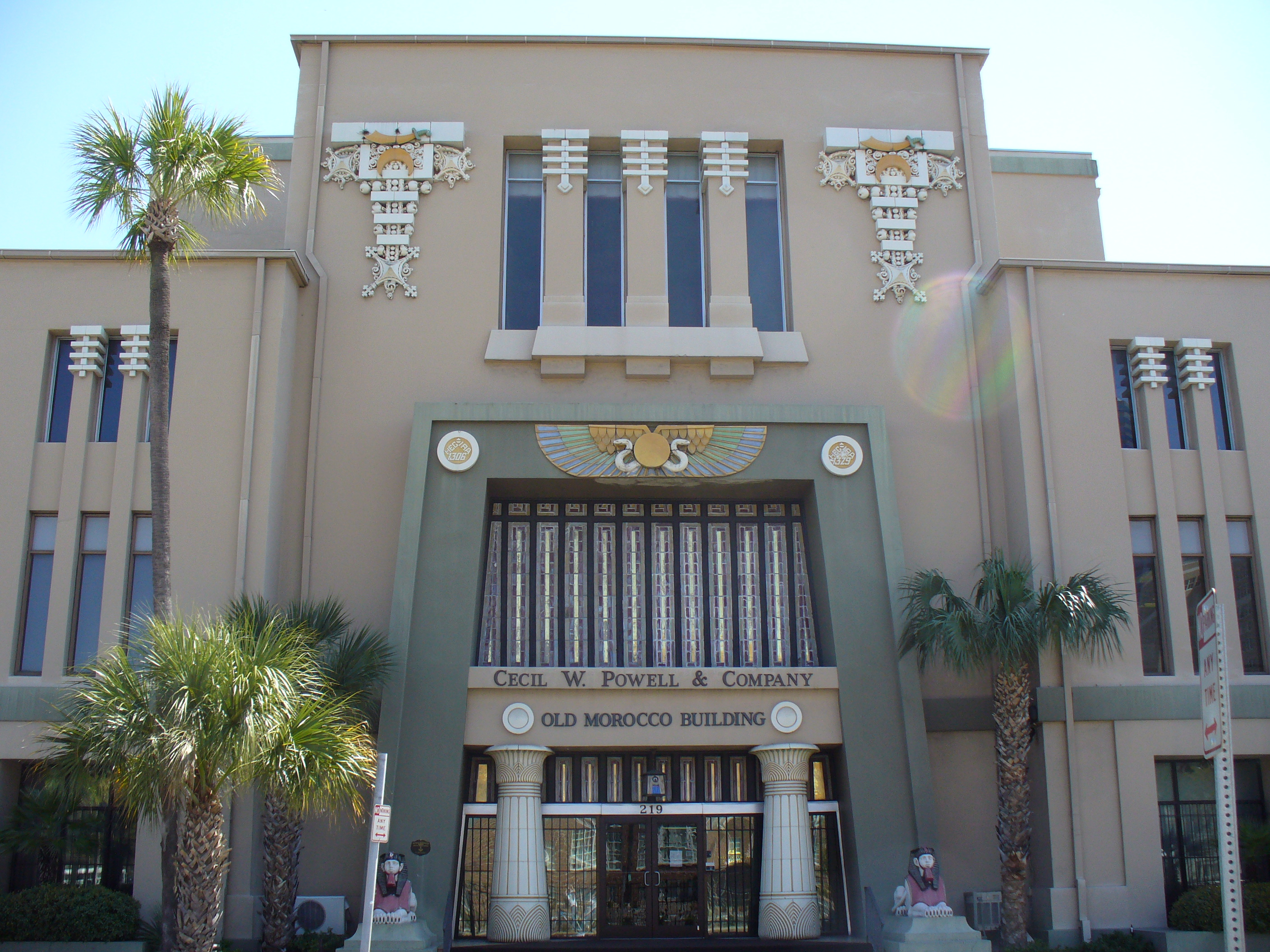
- Morocco Temple, Jacksonville, FL

- Location within Florida Location within the United States
- Location: Jacksonville, Florida, USA
- Coordinates: 30.32770°N 81.65472°W
- NRHP reference No.: 79000668
- Added to NRHP: November 29, 1979

The Morocco Temple (also known as the Morocco Temple, Ancient Arabic Order of the Nobles of the Mystic Shrine) is a historic Shriners International building in Jacksonville, Florida. It is located at 219 Newnan Street, and was designed by Jacksonville architect Henry John Klutho. On November 29, 1979, it was added to the U.S. National Register of Historic Places. The building is the oldest Shrine temple in Florida.

== History ==
The grand building was erected in 1910–1911 in the prairie style of architecture using ancient Egyptian-themed symbols. The entrance was a large battered architrave featuring a massive transom atop short columns in the Egyptian revival style. The three levels included a main floor, a 1,500 seat auditorium and a balcony.

The structure was constructed using steel reinforced concrete and stuccoed brick exterior walls with terracotta ornamentation. A fabricated metal cornice incorporating a geometric design projected above the third floor windows on the front and sides of the buildings, which was noted as a Sullivanesque ornament to emphasize a horizontal aspect. Inside, many windows and light fixtures used color-tinted glass, and mosaic-tiled floors looked like oriental carpets. The walls were covered with a polychromatic faience tile portraying ancient Egyptian symbols. Oil-painted murals illustrated the Freemasons' and Shriners' history, with scenes of Jesus, King Solomon and Mecca. The auditorium was 90 feet (27 m) wide with the roof supported by steel trusses. Access to the balcony was via two curved floating reinforced concrete stairways. The auditorium's ceiling was painted dark blue and imbedded with hundreds of pieces of glass that would reflect light, giving the appearance of stars. The curtain on stage was decorated with views of Arabia.

In the 1910s, when Jacksonville was the "Winter Film Capital of the World", Oliver Hardy was a member of the local temple. President William Howard Taft delivered a speech there in 1912, as did Theodore Roosevelt. Shirley Temple was one of the numerous celebrities who appeared at the Morocco Temple. The facility was also used for many major events and conventions. The Morocco Temple was the only auditorium in town until the Jacksonville Civic Auditorium was constructed in 1960.

Klutho's design was damaged in the late 1950s when the large metal cornice was removed from the front and sides. The tall ground floor windows on both sides were obscured. At the same time, an addition was constructed on the south side that extended beyond the front entrance, creating an unbalanced design.

Morocco Temple in the early 1910s

== Recent usage ==
The Shriners decided to move to the suburbs in the early 1980s. They wanted more space and room to park, plus "too many of their members were getting mugged leaving at night" according to Hugh Powell, the building's current owner. In the early 1980s the Shriners built a new facility on the south side. Their old building was purchased in 1984 by Cecil W. Powell & Company, an insurance broker. A huge renovation was required to create offices. However, because the building was on the National Register of Historic Places, the changes were required to retain the basic integrity of the structure. The stage was transformed into an atrium, and the murals were refurbished and encased with glass. The auditorium was destroyed when an additional floor was constructed, but the vertical windows on the building's sides were uncovered. The tile and staircases remain unmodified, and there are now four carpeted and partitioned floors with a total of 45,000 sq ft (4,200 m^{2}). The Powell company moved in 1986, and Jacksonville's Public Works Department rented the top three floors during the 1990s. Today, the Powell company is on the ground level, one floor is unoccupied, and lawyers, a title company and a court reporter rent office space in the other two. The Jacksonville Historical Society is working on a plan to restore the original exterior cornices.
