= National Register of Historic Places listings in Duval County, Florida =

Location of Duval County in Florida

This is a list of the National Register of Historic Places listings in Duval County, Florida.

This is intended to be a complete list of the properties and districts on the National Register of Historic Places in Duval County, Florida, United States. The locations of National Register properties and districts for which the latitude and longitude coordinates are included below, may be seen in a map.

There are 111 properties and districts listed on the National Register in the county, including 2 National Historic Landmark.

This National Park Service list is complete through NPS recent listings posted September 18, 2026.

Contents: Counties in Florida (non-linked contain no National Register listings)
Alachua - Baker - Bay - Bradford - Brevard - Broward - Calhoun - Charlotte - Citrus - Clay - Collier - Columbia - DeSoto - Dixie - Duval - Escambia - Flagler - Franklin - Gadsden - Gilchrist - Glades - Gulf - Hamilton - Hardee - Hendry - Hernando - Highlands - Hillsborough (Tampa) - Holmes - Indian River - Jackson - Jefferson - Lafayette - Lake - Lee - Leon - Levy - Liberty - Madison - Manatee - Marion - Martin - Miami-Dade (Miami) - Monroe - Nassau - Okaloosa - Okeechobee - Orange - Osceola - Palm Beach - Pasco - Pinellas - Polk - Putnam - St. Johns - St. Lucie - Santa Rosa - Sarasota - Seminole - Sumter - Suwannee - Taylor - Union - Volusia - Wakulla - Walton - Washington

== Current listings ==
| | Name on the Register | Image | Date listed | Location | City or town | Description |
|---|---|---|---|---|---|---|
| 1 | 310 West Church Street Apartments | 310 West Church Street Apartments | April 7, 1983 (#83001421) | 420 North Julia Street; 30°19′50″N 81°39′41″W | Jacksonville | Formerly the Ambassador Hotel |
| 2 | American Red Cross Volunteer Life Saving Corps Station | American Red Cross Volunteer Life Saving Corps Station | May 5, 2014 (#14000187) | 2 Ocean Front North; 30°17′22″N 81°23′23″W | Jacksonville Beach | |
| 3 | Henry C. Arpen House | Henry C. Arpen House | August 26, 2019 (#100004347) | 3318 O'Connor Road; 30°08′50″N 81°37′07″W | Jacksonville | |
| 4 | Atlantic Coast Line Railroad Locomotive No. 1504 | Atlantic Coast Line Railroad Locomotive No. 1504 | January 23, 2018 (#100001388) | 1000 West Bay St. 30°19′43″N 81°40′17″W | Jacksonville | |
| 5 | Atlantic National Bank Annex | Atlantic National Bank Annex | November 7, 1997 (#97001328) | 118 West Adams Street; 30°19′40″N 81°39′36″W | Jacksonville | Part of the Downtown Jacksonville Multiple Property Submission |
| 6 | Avondale Historic District | Avondale Historic District | July 6, 1989 (#89000494) | Roughly bounded by Roosevelt Boulevard, Belvedere Avenue, Seminole Road, the St. Johns River, and Talbot Avenue; 30°18′11″N 81°42′19″W | Jacksonville | |
| 7 | Bethel Baptist Institutional Church | Bethel Baptist Institutional Church | April 6, 1978 (#78000938) | 1058 Hogan Street; 30°20′09″N 81°39′30″W | Jacksonville | |
| 8 | Brewster Hospital | Brewster Hospital | May 13, 1976 (#76000588) | 843 West Monroe Street; 30°19′52″N 81°40′08″W | Jacksonville | |
| 9 | Napoleon Bonaparte Broward House | Napoleon Bonaparte Broward House | December 27, 1972 (#72000308) | 9953 Hecksher Drive; 30°24′09″N 81°25′58″W | Jacksonville | |
| 10 | Carling Hotel | Carling Hotel | February 28, 1991 (#91000225) | 33 West Adams Street; 30°19′42″N 81°39′29″W | Jacksonville | |
| 11 | Casa Marina Hotel | Casa Marina Hotel | September 2, 1993 (#93000893) | 12 Sixth Avenue, North; 30°17′40″N 81°23′26″W | Jacksonville Beach | |
| 12 | Centennial Hall at Edward Waters College | Centennial Hall at Edward Waters College | May 4, 1976 (#76000589) | 1715 Kings Road; 30°20′40″N 81°41′04″W | Jacksonville | |
| 13 | Basilica of the Immaculate Conception | Basilica of the Immaculate Conception | December 30, 1992 (#92001695) | 121 East Duval Street; 30°19′44″N 81°39′19″W | Jacksonville | Part of the Downtown Jacksonville Multiple Property Submission |
| 14 | Clara White Mission | Clara White Mission | April 18, 2025 (#100011739) | 611-615 West Ashley Street; 30°19′57″N 81°39′50″W | Jacksonville | |
| 15 | Clifton Cemetery | | April 15, 2022 (#100007617) | Intersection of Garrison and Magnolia Bluff Aves; 30°19′20″N 81°36′34″W | Jacksonville | |
| 16 | Cummer Gardens | Cummer Gardens | January 25, 2010 (#09000345) | 829 Riverside Ave. 30°18′54″N 81°40′37″W | Jacksonville | |
| 17 | Downtown Jacksonville Historic District | Downtown Jacksonville Historic District | May 2, 2016 (#16000212) | Roughly bounded by North Pearl, Beaver, and North Catherine Streets, and Independent/Courthouse Drives; 30°19′45″N 81°39′26″W | Jacksonville | |
| 18 | Durkee Gardens Historic District | Durkee Gardens Historic District | March 16, 2020 (#100005088) | Bound by Myrtle Ave., 13th St. West, Payne Ave, Wilcox St. and 8th St. West; 30°20′56″N 81°40′23″W | Jacksonville | |
| 19 | Duval County Armory | Duval County Armory | July 27, 2023 (#100009203) | 851 North Market St. 30°19′57″N 81°39′06″W | Jacksonville | |
| 20 | Joseph H. Durkee Athletic Field | Joseph H. Durkee Athletic Field | July 11, 2013 (#13000484) | 1701 Myrtle Avenue; 30°20′47″N 81°40′30″W | Jacksonville | |
| 21 | Dyal-Upchurch Building | Dyal-Upchurch Building | April 17, 1980 (#80000947) | 4 East Bay Street; 30°19′33″N 81°39′27″W | Jacksonville | |
| 22 | Eastside Historic District | | July 3, 2023 (#100009081) | Roughly bounded by East 7th St., MLK Jr. Pkwy, Arlington Expy, and Cemetery St. 30°20′11″N 81°38′29″W | Jacksonville | Part of the African American Architects in Segregated Jacksonville, 1865-1965 MPS |
| 23 | Edward Waters College Historic District | Edward Waters College Historic District | August 8, 2022 (#100007972) | 1658 Kings Rd. 30°20′37″N 81°41′01″W | Jacksonville | |
| 24 | El Modelo Block | El Modelo Block | October 16, 1980 (#80000948) | 513 West Bay Street; 30°19′38″N 81°39′53″W | Jacksonville | |
| 25 | Elks Club Building | Elks Club Building | March 9, 2000 (#00000151) | 201-213 North Laura Street; 30°19′41″N 81°39′32″W | Jacksonville | Part of the Downtown Jacksonville Multiple Property Submission |
| 26 | Epping Forest | Epping Forest | May 9, 1973 (#73000576) | Christopher Point, off San Jose Boulevard; 30°14′54″N 81°38′26″W | Jacksonville | |
| 27 | Evergreen Cemetery | Evergreen Cemetery | April 8, 2011 (#11000157) | 4535 N Main St; 30°22′01″N 81°39′03″W | Jacksonville | |
| 28 | Florida Baptist Building | Florida Baptist Building | January 12, 1984 (#84000844) | 218 West Church Street; 30°19′49″N 81°39′37″W | Jacksonville | |
| 29 | Florida Theater | Florida Theater | November 4, 1982 (#82001034) | 128-134 East Forsyth Street; 30°19′35″N 81°39′20″W | Jacksonville | |
| 30 | Fort Caroline National Memorial | Fort Caroline National Memorial | October 15, 1966 (#66000061) | 10 miles east of downtown Jacksonville; 30°23′13″N 81°30′02″W | Jacksonville | |
| 31 | Garden Club of Jacksonville | | April 20, 2023 (#100008872) | 1005 Riverside Ave. 30°18′50″N 81°40′39″W | Jacksonville | |
| 32 | Grand Site | | June 20, 1975 (#75000551) | Address Restricted | Jacksonville | |
| 33 | Groover-Stewart Drug Company Building | Groover-Stewart Drug Company Building | December 30, 1992 (#92001696) | 25 North Market Street; 30°19′33″N 81°38′08″W | Jacksonville | Part of the Downtown Jacksonville Multiple Property Submission |
| 34 | Hillman-Pratt Funeral Home | | January 24, 2024 (#100009793) | 525 West Beaver Street; 30°19′59″N 81°39′48″W | Jacksonville | |
| 35 | House at 3325 Via de la Reina | House at 3325 Via de la Reina | April 10, 1985 (#85000739) | 3325 Via de la Reina; 30°14′42″N 81°37′41″W | Jacksonville | Part of the San Jose Estates TR |
| 36 | House at 3335 Via de la Reina | House at 3335 Via de la Reina | April 10, 1985 (#85000740) | 3335 Via de la Reina; 30°14′42″N 81°37′40″W | Jacksonville | No longer extant. Part of the San Jose Estates TR |
| 37 | House at 3500 Via de la Reina | House at 3500 Via de la Reina | April 10, 1985 (#85000741) | 3500 Via de la Reina; 30°14′39″N 81°37′32″W | Jacksonville | Part of the San Jose Estates TR |
| 38 | House at 3609 Via de la Reina | House at 3609 Via de la Reina | April 10, 1985 (#85000742) | 3609 Via de la Reina; 30°14′39″N 81°37′28″W | Jacksonville | Part of the San Jose Estates TR |
| 39 | House at 3685 Via de la Reina | House at 3685 Via de la Reina | April 10, 1985 (#85000743) | 3685 Via de la Reina; 30°14′34″N 81°37′14″W | Jacksonville | Part of the San Jose Estates TR |
| 40 | House at 3703 Via de la Reina | House at 3703 Via de la Reina | April 10, 1985 (#85000744) | 3703 Via de la Reina; 30°14′32″N 81°37′06″W | Jacksonville | Part of the San Jose Estates TR |
| 41 | House at 3764 Ponce de Leon Avenue | House at 3764 Ponce de Leon Avenue | April 10, 1985 (#85000745) | 3764 Ponce de Leon Avenue; 30°14′38″N 81°37′13″W | Jacksonville | Part of the San Jose Estates TR |
| 42 | House at 7144 Madrid Avenue | House at 7144 Madrid Avenue | April 10, 1985 (#85000746) | 7144 Madrid Avenue; 30°14′53″N 81°37′54″W | Jacksonville | Part of the San Jose Estates TR |
| 43 | House at 7207 Ventura Avenue | House at 7207 Ventura Avenue | April 10, 1985 (#85000747) | 7207 Ventura Avenue; 30°14′48″N 81°37′36″W | Jacksonville | Part of the San Jose Estates TR |
| 44 | House at 7217 Ventura Avenue | House at 7217 Ventura Avenue | April 10, 1985 (#85000748) | 7217 Ventura Avenue; 30°14′46″N 81°37′36″W | Jacksonville | Part of the San Jose Estates TR |
| 45 | House at 7227 San Pedro | House at 7227 San Pedro | April 10, 1985 (#85000749) | 7227 San Pedro Road; 30°14′41″N 81°37′57″W | Jacksonville | Part of the San Jose Estates TR |
| 46 | House at 7245 San Jose Boulevard | House at 7245 San Jose Boulevard | April 10, 1985 (#85000750) | 7245 San Jose Boulevard; 30°14′45″N 81°37′48″W | Jacksonville | Part of the San Jose Estates TR |
| 47 | House at 7246 San Carlos | House at 7246 San Carlos | April 10, 1985 (#85000751) | 7246 San Carlos; 30°14′42″N 81°37′56″W | Jacksonville | Part of the San Jose Estates TR |
| 48 | House at 7246 St. Augustine Road | House at 7246 St. Augustine Road | April 10, 1985 (#85000752) | 7246 St. Augustine Road; 30°14′45″N 81°37′34″W | Jacksonville | Part of the San Jose Estates TR |
| 49 | House at 7249 San Pedro | House at 7249 San Pedro | April 10, 1985 (#85000753) | 7249 San Pedro Road; 30°14′40″N 81°37′56″W | Jacksonville | Part of the San Jose Estates TR |
| 50 | House at 7288 San Jose Boulevard | House at 7288 San Jose Boulevard | April 10, 1985 (#85000754) | 7288 San Jose Boulevard; 30°14′42″N 81°37′47″W | Jacksonville | Part of the San Jose Estates TR |
| 51 | House at 7306 St. Augustine Road | House at 7306 St. Augustine Road | April 10, 1985 (#85000755) | 7306 St. Augustine Road; 30°14′41″N 81°37′34″W | Jacksonville | Part of the San Jose Estates TR |
| 52 | House at 7317 San Jose Boulevard | House at 7317 San Jose Boulevard | April 10, 1985 (#85000756) | 7317 San Jose Boulevard; 30°14′43″N 81°37′44″W | Jacksonville | Part of the San Jose Estates TR |
| 53 | House at 7330 Ventura Avenue | House at 7330 Ventura Avenue | April 10, 1985 (#85000757) | 7330 Ventura Avenue; 30°14′42″N 81°37′40″W | Jacksonville | Part of the San Jose Estates TR |
| 54 | House at 7356 San Jose Boulevard | House at 7356 San Jose Boulevard | April 10, 1985 (#85000758) | 7356 San Jose Boulevard; 30°14′40″N 81°37′43″W | Jacksonville | Part of the San Jose Estates TR |
| 55 | House at 7400 San Jose Boulevard | House at 7400 San Jose Boulevard | April 10, 1985 (#85000759) | 7400 San Jose Boulevard; 30°14′38″N 81°37′44″W | Jacksonville | Part of the San Jose Estates TR |
| 56 | Hutchinson-Suddath Building | Hutchinson-Suddath Building | October 3, 2007 (#07001029) | 315-319 East Bay Street; 30°19′31″N 81°39′15″W | Jacksonville | Part of the Downtown Jacksonville Multiple Property Submission |
| 57 | Jacksonville Jewish Center | Jacksonville Jewish Center | April 2, 2021 (#100006358) | 205 West 3rd St. 30°20′22″N 81°39′30″W | Jacksonville | There was a fire in the main building in 2011 and it was demolished. Its cornerstone exists in the park across the street. |
| 58 | Jacksonville Terminal Complex | Jacksonville Terminal Complex | October 22, 1976 (#76000590) | 1000 West Bay Street; 30°19′40″N 81°40′17″W | Jacksonville | Now the Prime F. Osborn III Convention Center |
| 59 | Kingsley Plantation | Kingsley Plantation | September 29, 1970 (#70000182) | Northern tip of Fort George Island at Fort George Inlet; 30°26′18″N 81°26′17″W | Jacksonville | |
| 60 | Henry John Klutho House | Henry John Klutho House | December 19, 1978 (#78000939) | 28-30 West 9th Street; 30°20′48″N 81°39′18″W | Jacksonville | |
| 61 | W. A. Knight Building | W. A. Knight Building | March 15, 2005 (#05000139) | 113 West Adams Street; 30°19′42″N 81°39′33″W | Jacksonville | Also known as the Greenleaf & Crosby Annex and the Peninsular Building. Part of the Downtown Jacksonville Multiple Property Submission |
| 62 | Lane-Towers House | Lane-Towers House | November 10, 1982 (#82001035) | 3730 Richmond Street; 30°17′29″N 81°42′17″W | Jacksonville | |
| 63 | Lewis Mausoleum | Lewis Mausoleum | October 24, 1997 (#97001225) | Memorial Cemetery at the junction of Edgewood Avenue and Moncreif Road; 30°22′52″N 81°41′47″W | Jacksonville | |
| 64 | Little Theatre | Little Theatre | July 12, 1991 (#91000895) | 2032 San Marco Boulevard; 30°18′11″N 81°39′10″W | Jacksonville | |
| 65 | Lynch Building | Lynch Building | December 23, 2003 (#03001310) | 11 Forsyth Street; 30°19′37″N 81°39′27″W | Jacksonville | Part of the Downtown Jacksonville Multiple Property Submission |
| 66 | Mandarin Store and Post Office | Mandarin Store and Post Office | October 1, 2001 (#01001056) | 12471 Mandarin Road; 30°09′39″N 81°39′35″W | Jacksonville | |
| 67 | Maple Leaf (Shipwreck Site) | Maple Leaf (Shipwreck Site) | October 12, 1994 (#94001650) | In the middle of the St. Johns River, 12 miles (19 km) south of downtown Jacksonville; 30°09′30″N 81°40′48″W | Jacksonville | |
| 68 | Marabanong | Marabanong | December 11, 2013 (#13000899) | 4747 River Point Rd. 30°18′50″N 81°37′04″W | Jacksonville | |
| 69 | Masonic Temple | Masonic Temple | September 22, 1980 (#80000949) | 410 Broad Street; 30°19′51″N 81°39′52″W | Jacksonville | |
| 70 | Memorial Cemetery | Memorial Cemetery | February 5, 2020 (#100004973) | Moncrief Rd. and Edgewood Ave. West; 30°22′52″N 81°41′47″W | Jacksonville | |
| 71 | Memorial Park | Memorial Park | October 25, 2017 (#100001389) | Memorial Park Dr. 30°18′38″N 81°40′47″W | Jacksonville | |
| 72 | Mission of San Juan del Puerto Archeological Site | Mission of San Juan del Puerto Archeological Site | March 25, 1986 (#86000595) | Address Restricted | Jacksonville | |
| 73 | Morocco Temple | Morocco Temple | November 29, 1979 (#79000668) | 219 Newnan St. 30°19′40″N 81°39′17″W | Jacksonville | |
| 74 | Mt. Calvary Baptist Church | Mt. Calvary Baptist Church | March 16, 2020 (#100005087) | 301 Spruce St. 30°19′30″N 81°40′34″W | Jacksonville | |
| 75 | Mount Zion AME Church | Mount Zion AME Church | December 30, 1992 (#92001697) | 201 East Beaver Street; 30°19′51″N 81°38′09″W | Jacksonville | Part of the Downtown Jacksonville Multiple Property Submission |
| 76 | Norman Film Studios | Norman Film Studios | December 29, 2014 (#14001084) | 6337 Arlington Rd. 30°20′02″N 81°35′37″W | Jacksonville | Designated a National Historic Landmark October 31, 2016. |
| 77 | Old Jacksonville Free Public Library | Old Jacksonville Free Public Library | January 22, 1987 (#86003679) | 101 East Adams Street; 30°19′39″N 81°39′22″W | Jacksonville | Now the Bedell Building |
| 78 | Old Ortega Historic District | Old Ortega Historic District | July 14, 2004 (#04000682) | Bounded by Roosevelt Boulevard, Verona Avenue, and the St. Johns and Ortega Rivers; 30°16′27″N 81°42′18″W | Jacksonville | |
| 79 | Old St. Luke's Hospital | Old St. Luke's Hospital | July 24, 1972 (#72000310) | 314 North Palmetto Street; 30°19′33″N 81°38′49″W | Jacksonville | |
| 80 | Palm Spring Cemetery | Palm Spring Cemetery | November 24, 2020 (#100005819) | 11396 Fort Caroline Rd; 30°21′56″N 81°30′45″W | Jacksonville | Part of the Historic African American Cemeteries in Duval County, Florida (1765-1969) MPS |
| 81 | Plaza Hotel | Plaza Hotel | December 30, 1992 (#92001698) | 353 East Forsyth Street; 30°19′33″N 81°38′13″W | Jacksonville | Part of the Downtown Jacksonville Multiple Property Submission |
| 82 | Thomas V. Porter House | Thomas V. Porter House | May 13, 1976 (#76000592) | 510 Julia Street; 30°19′52″N 81°39′39″W | Jacksonville | |
| 83 | Red Bank Plantation | Red Bank Plantation | October 18, 1972 (#72000311) | 1230 Greenridge Road; 30°17′02″N 81°39′09″W | Jacksonville | |
| 84 | Ribault Inn Club | Ribault Inn Club | May 11, 2000 (#00000470) | Ft. George Road; 30°25′41″N 81°25′28″W | Jacksonville | |
| 85 | Riverside Baptist Church | Riverside Baptist Church | September 22, 1972 (#72000312) | 2650 Park Street; 30°18′37″N 81°41′35″W | Jacksonville | |
| 86 | Riverside Historic District | Riverside Historic District | March 22, 1985 (#85000689) | Roughly bounded by the former Seaboard Coast Line railroad line, Riverside and Memorial Parks, the St. Johns River, and Seminole; 30°18′39″N 81°41′32″W | Jacksonville | |
| 87 | St. Andrew's Episcopal Church | St. Andrew's Episcopal Church | May 4, 1976 (#76000593) | 317 Florida Avenue; 30°19′32″N 81°38′37″W | Jacksonville | |
| 88 | St. George Episcopal Church | St. George Episcopal Church | August 9, 2002 (#02000839) | 10560 Ft. George Road, E. 30°24′48″N 81°25′48″W | Jacksonville | Part of the Florida's Carpenter Gothic Churches MPS |
| 89 | St. James Building | St. James Building | May 3, 1976 (#76000594) | 117 West Duval Street; 30°19′48″N 81°39′34″W | Jacksonville | |
| 90 | St. Johns Light | St. Johns Light | March 20, 2018 (#100002224) | 500 ft. NE of jct. of Baltimore St. & Naval Station St. 7; 30°23′10″N 81°23′53″W | Jacksonville | In Naval Station Mayport |
| 91 | St. John's Lighthouse | St. John's Lighthouse | June 3, 1976 (#76002237) | U.S. Naval Station; 30°23′36″N 81°25′35″W | Naval Station Mayport | |
| 92 | St. Matthews Methodist Episcopal Church | St. Matthews Methodist Episcopal Church | October 6, 2022 (#100008276) | 825 West Monroe St. 30°19′51″N 81°40′04″W | Jacksonville | Part of the African American Architects in Segregated Jacksonville, 1865-1965 MPS |
| 93 | John S. Sammis House | John S. Sammis House | July 10, 1979 (#79000669) | 207 Noble Circle West; 30°19′19″N 81°36′44″W | Jacksonville | |
| 94 | San Jose Administration Building | San Jose Administration Building | April 10, 1985 (#85000760) | 7423 San Jose Boulevard; 30°14′37″N 81°37′35″W | Jacksonville | Part of the San Jose Estates TR |
| 95 | San Jose Country Club | San Jose Country Club | April 10, 1985 (#85000761) | 7529 San Jose Boulevard; 30°14′30″N 81°37′29″W | Jacksonville | Part of the San Jose Estates TR |
| 96 | San Jose Estates Gatehouse | San Jose Estates Gatehouse | December 20, 1988 (#88002808) | 1873 Christopher Point Road, North; 30°15′17″N 81°38′33″W | Jacksonville | Part of the San Jose Estates TR |
| 97 | San Jose Hotel | San Jose Hotel | April 10, 1985 (#85000762) | 7400 San Jose Boulevard; 30°14′30″N 81°37′47″W | Jacksonville | Part of the San Jose Estates TR |
| 98 | Snyder Memorial Methodist Episcopal Church | Snyder Memorial Methodist Episcopal Church | March 13, 2013 (#13000065) | 226 N. Laura St. 30°19′43″N 81°39′32″W | Jacksonville | |
| 99 | South Jacksonville Grammar School | South Jacksonville Grammar School | April 15, 2004 (#04000278) | 1450 Flagler Avenue; 30°18′39″N 81°39′28″W | Jacksonville | |
| 100 | Springfield Historic District | Springfield Historic District | January 22, 1987 (#86003640) | Roughly bounded by Twelfth, Clark, and First Streets, Hogans Creek, and Boulevard; 30°20′35″N 81°39′12″W | Jacksonville | |
| 101 | Edwin M. Stanton School | Edwin M. Stanton School | September 29, 1983 (#83001446) | 521 West Ashley Street; 30°19′56″N 81°39′48″W | Jacksonville | |
| 102 | Timucuan Ecological and Historic Preserve | Timucuan Ecological and Historic Preserve | February 16, 1988 (#01000283) | 13165 Mt. Pleasant Road; 30°22′08″N 81°29′09″W | Jacksonville | |
| 103 | Title & Trust Company of Florida Building | Title & Trust Company of Florida Building | February 23, 1990 (#90000312) | 200 East Forsyth Street; 30°19′34″N 81°39′19″W | Jacksonville | |
| 104 | Tolbert House | Tolbert House | October 20, 2023 (#100009458) | 1665 Pearce St. 30°20′44″N 81°41′03″W | Jacksonville | Part of the African American Architects in Segregated Jacksonville, 1865-1965 MPS |
| 105 | Bishop Henry Y. Tookes House | | August 9, 2022 (#100007980) | 1011 West 8th St. 30°20′51″N 81°40′11″W | Jacksonville | |
| 106 | Union Terminal Company Warehouse | Union Terminal Company Warehouse | April 1, 2021 (#100006347) | 700 East Union St. 30°19′52″N 81°38′48″W | Jacksonville | |
| 107 | Unitarian Universalist Church of Jacksonville | Unitarian Universalist Church of Jacksonville | October 15, 2019 (#100004516) | 7405 Arlington Expressway; 30°19′40″N 81°34′51″W | Jacksonville | |
| 108 | Village Store | Village Store | September 29, 1988 (#88001700) | 4216, 4212, and 4208 Oxford Avenue and 2906 and 2902 Corinthian Avenue; 30°16′19″N 81°42′18″W | Jacksonville | |
| 109 | West 4th Street Church of God | | September 27, 2022 (#100008233) | 723 West 4th St. 30°20′31″N 81°39′55″W | Jacksonville | |
| 110 | Yellow Bluff Fort | Yellow Bluff Fort | September 29, 1970 (#70000183) | 1 mile south of State Road 105 on New Berlin Road; 30°23′58″N 81°33′22″W | Jacksonville | |
| 111 | Young Men's Hebrew Association | Young Men's Hebrew Association | October 29, 1992 (#92001486) | 712 West Duval Street; 30°19′50″N 81°40′01″W | Jacksonville | |

== Former listing ==
| | Name on the Register | Image | Date listed | Date removed | Location | City or town | Description |
|---|---|---|---|---|---|---|---|
| 1 | Buckman and Ulmer Building | Buckman and Ulmer Building | December 30, 1992 (#92001694) | August 22, 2023 | 29-33 West Monroe Street; 30°19′43″N 81°39′10″W | Jacksonville | Part of the Downtown Jacksonville Multiple Property Submission |
| 2 | Catherine Street Fire Station | Catherine Street Fire Station | June 13, 1972 (#72000309) | August 22, 2023 | 14 Catherine Street; 30°19′30″N 81°39′02″W | Jacksonville | |
| 3 | La Villa Boarding Houses | | June 21, 1976 (#76000591) | February 24, 1981 | 830, 832, 836 Houston St. | Jacksonville | |
| 4 | South Atlantic Investment Corporation Building | South Atlantic Investment Corporation Building | December 30, 1992 (#92001699) | August 22, 2023 | 35-39 West Monroe Street; 30°19′43″N 81°39′08″W | Jacksonville | Part of the Downtown Jacksonville Multiple Property Submission |
| 5 | Woman's Club of Jacksonville | Woman's Club of Jacksonville | November 3, 1992 (#92001505) | August 22, 2023 | 861 Riverside Avenue; 30°18′52″N 81°40′36″W | Jacksonville | Demolished |

== See also ==
- List of National Historic Landmarks in Florida
- National Register of Historic Places listings in Florida
