= O.P. Woodcock =

American contractor

Owen Preston Woodcock (died 1983), most commonly known as O.P. Woodcock, was an American builder. Many of his works are associated with Marsh & Saxelbye, and listed on the U.S. National Register of Historic Places.

A study of the San Jose Estates development states:

Following the development's commitment to quality in design and construction, O.P. Woodcock, founder and president of the O.P. Woodcock Company, was engaged as the general contractor for the project. The Woodcock firm was the oldest contracting firm in the state and was responsible for projects such as The Florida National Bank Building, the Church of the Immaculate Conception, the concrete portion of the Old Gator Bowl, the Marine Hospital in Key West, the Coquina Hotel at Ormond Beach, the Lyceum and Convent at St. Augustine and others. Woodcock was also active in civic affairs such as the Chamber of Commerce, and the Boy Scouts.

His works include:

- Buckman and Ulmer Building, 29—33 W. Monroe St., Jacksonville, FL (Woodcock, O.P.
- Church of the Immaculate Conception, 121 E. Duval St., Jacksonville, FL (Halsema-Woodcock Co.) NRHP-listed
- Hastings High School, 6195 S. Main St., Hastings, FL (Woodcock, Owen Preston) NRHP-listed
- House at 3325 Via de la Reina, 3325 Via de la Reiva, Jacksonville, FL (Woodcock, O.P.) NRHP-listed
- House at 3335 Via de la Reina, 3335 Via de la Reina, Jacksonville, FL (Woodcock, O.P.) NRHP-listed
- House at 3500 Via de la Reina, 3500 Via de la Reina, Jacksonville, FL (Woodcock, O.P.) NRHP-listed
- House at 3609 Via de la Reina, 3609 Via de la Reina, Jacksonville, FL (Woodcock, O.P.) NRHP-listed
- House at 3685 Via de la Reina, 3685 Via de la Reina, Jacksonville, FL (Woodcock, O.P.) NRHP-listed
- House at 3703 Via de la Reina, 3703 Via de la Reina, Jacksonville, FL (Woodcock, O.P.) NRHP-listed
- House at 3764 Ponce de Leon Avenue, 3764 Ponce de Leon Ave., Jacksonville, FL (Woodcock, O.P.) NRHP-listed
- House at 7144 Madrid Avenue, 7144 Madrid Ave., Jacksonville, FL (Woodcock, O.P.) NRHP-listed
- House at 7207 Ventura Avenue, 7207 Ventura Ave., Jacksonville, FL (Woodcock, O.P.) NRHP-listed
- House at 7217 Ventura Avenue, 7217 Ventura Ave., Jacksonville, FL (Woodcock, O.P.) NRHP-listed
- House at 7227 San Pedro, 7227 San Pedro Rd., Jacksonville, FL (Woodcock, O.P.) NRHP-listed
- House at 7245 San Jose Boulevard, 7245 San Jose Blvd., Jacksonville, FL (Woodcock, O.P.) NRHP-listed
- House at 7246 San Carlos, 7246 San Carlos, Jacksonville, FL (Woodcock, O.P.) NRHP-listed
- House at 7246 St. Augustine Road, 7246 St. Augustine Rd., Jacksonville, FL (Woodcock, O.P.) NRHP-listed
- House at 7288 San Jose Boulevard, 7288 San Jose Blvd., Jacksonville, FL (Woodcock, O.P.) NRHP-listed
- House at 7306 St. Augustine Road, 7306 St. Augustine Rd., Jacksonville, FL (Woodcock, O.P.) NRHP-listed
- House at 7317 San Jose Boulevard, 7317 San Jose Blvd., Jacksonville, FL (Woodcock, O.P.) NRHP-listed
- House at 7330 Ventura Avenue, 7330 Ventura Ave., Jacksonville, FL (Woodcock, O.P.) NRHP-listed
- House at 7356 San Jose Boulevard, 7356 San Jose Blvd., Jacksonville, FL (Woodcock, O.P.) NRHP-listed
- W.A. Knight Building, 113 W. Adams St., Jacksonville, FL (Woodcock, O.P.) NRHP-listed
- San Jose Administration Building, 7423 San Jose Blvd., Jacksonville, FL (Woodcock, O.P.) NRHP-listed
- San Jose Country Club, 7529 San Jose Blvd., Jacksonville, FL (Woodcock, O.P.) NRHP-listed
- San Jose Estates Gatehouse, 1873 Christopher Point Rd., North, Jacksonville, FL (Woodcock, O.P.) NRHP-listed
- San Jose Hotel, 7400 San Jose Boulevard, Jacksonville, FL (Woodcock, O.P) NRHP-listed
