= San Jose (Jacksonville) =

Neighborhood of Jacksonville, Florida

- Neighborhood of Jacksonville
- ZIP Code: 32217, 32257
- Area code(s): 904, 324

San Jose is a historic suburban neighborhood of Jacksonville, Florida on the city's Southside, 4½ miles from Downtown. The residential streets have homes that vary from million-dollar waterfront mansions to small wood-frame starters with a variety of architectural styles, including midcentury modern ranch-style homes, Spanish Revival bungalows, and more contemporary designs. Landmarks include the San Jose Country Club, The Bolles School and Epping Forest Yacht & Country Club. In the 1920s, it was a planned community derailed by the Depression.

== Geography ==
San Jose is located 4½ miles south of Downtown along the east bank of the St. Johns River, south to San Clerc Road; bounded on the east by the railroad tracks west of U.S. Highway 1 and north by University Boulevard.

== History ==
The development's location corresponded to a land tract of 1,135-acre (459 ha) granted by the Spanish government to Francis Xavier Sanchez in the late 1700s. It was later known as San Jose Plantation, associated with Zephaniah Kingsley and his Kingsley Plantation.

San Jose Estates map

=== San Jose Estates ===
The origins of the community started with the establishment of the San Jose Company in 1914 by Claude Nolan, who owned a Jacksonville Cadillac car dealership. He supported the project, believing automobiles would hasten the development of suburban communities. His plans were delayed because of World War I.

A charter was granted on January 25, 1925, for San Jose Estates to Charles W. Strickland. The company planned a community that would include a golf course, two hotels, a country club, an esplanade on the riverbank, a yacht club, a school, a church, parks, retail shops and nearly 2,000 homes. The company purchased 1,000-acre (400 ha) of what was once the San Jose plantation, Landscape architect John Nolen was hired and construction began. Nolen was a city planning professional whose work included designs for the cities of Sarasota, Venice, St. Petersburg and West Palm Beach. San Jose was intended to be a self-contained functional city. Strickland also hired noted golf course architect Donald Ross to design the golf course and local architects Marsh & Saxelbye to design major buildings and residences in the Mediterranean Revival style.

Layout for the development utilized a radial pattern around the hotel. Streets were named for cities in Spain. San Jose Boulevard, the major parkway, was nicely landscaped; public buildings and parks were scattered throughout. Everything was centered around the Plaza del Sanchez in the 1,911-lot project. It was unusual that all streets included paved sidewalks. Sales began in July with $732,000 for the first week; in early August 1925 Phase I was sold out.

The Claude Nolan's San Jose Company donated its interest in the development to Richard Bolle's estate before ground was broken.

The San Jose Estates Administration Building, completed in 1925, was the location of the development's offices for their salesmen, executives and engineers. There was also a small casino and a gas station demonstrating their faith in the automobile's future.

Construction on the hotel began in the summer of 1925 and the building was completed in six months by 600 workmen. On New Year's Day of 1926, the elegant San Jose Hotel opened as the center of the community, followed by the San Jose Golf Club.

The San Jose Hotel was capacious, with 65,332-square-foot (6,069.5 m^{2}) over three floors. The primary building of the hotel featured 100 guest rooms and cost the equivalent of $14.7 million today. Secondary structures provided another 125 rooms. The first level, which is unchanged, contains a restaurant (now dining hall) that overlooks the St. Johns River, a beauty parlor, a barber shop and an elevator.

Numerous activities were provided by the hotel for their guests. Yachting, swimming and fishing were available on the St. Johns River; horseback riding and polo were offered nearby, as were tennis and trap shooting. The San Jose Hotel Golf Course, now the San Jose Country Club, was across San Jose Boulevard and known as one of Florida's most challenging courses at the time. The 18 holes were laid out by Donald Ross, a Scottish golfer who designed approximately 400 courses in the U.S. and Canada during the first half of the twentieth century. Jacksonville as four courses he created.

During the planning of the resort, Nolen knew that San Jose Hotel guests would have easy access. At the time, five rail lines connected San Jose to the rest of the country. Ships from the Clyde Steamship company regularly docked at Jacksonville's port. Airplanes could also land at an airfield across the river. At its opening in 1926, the San Jose Hotel was booked solid.

=== Economy ===
All this development occurred during the Florida land boom of the 1920s when Florida's real estate market experienced a speculative bubble driven by increased tourism, easy credit, and state-sponsored tax incentives, which led to rapid population growth and skyrocketing land prices. This boom ended with a crash in 1926, exacerbated by the 1926 Miami hurricane, the collapse of credit, negative news coverage, and the subsequent Great Depression, causing widespread financial ruin and making Florida's depression begin four years ahead of the rest of the nation.

Epping Forest Mansion

At the end of 1926 buyers had stopped making payments, so construction was halted. Plans for the Vanderbilt, a second hotel, were cancelled. The Vanderbilt site was purchased by Alfred I. DuPont, Delaware industrialist who had recently relocated in Jacksonville with Jessie Ball duPont, his wife. They named their 58-acre (23 ha) estate, Epping Forest, then hired Marsh & Saxelbye to design a 15,000-square-foot (1,400 m^{2}) 25-room mansion and grounds, completed in 1927.

In 1928 the hotel closed its doors permanently. Cain began foreclosure proceedings and San Jose Estates declared bankruptcy. The estate of philanthropist Richard J. Bolles owned the property. Cain and her husband formed the Bolles Investment Company as a corporation. Roger Painter assumed the presidency with his wife as treasurer. The hotel was sold by the Bolles estate for $225,000 in capital stock to the Bolles Investment Company. Following the sale, the property was leased for $100,000 by a hotel group. The Florida Military Academy was located in Green Cove Springs. They signed a lease for the property and moved to Jacksonville.

By the summer in 1932, the effects of the depression caused the academy to default on their lease, and they packed up, leaving the former hotel vacant except for the Painters. John C. Cooper, a Jacksonville attorney, suggested they start a school, which the community needed. Roger and Agnes Cain Painter founded The Bolles School as a male military preparatory school and it opened on January 5, 1933. The school's namesake was their former boss, Richard J. Bolles, who died 16 years before the school was founded.

== Neighborhood ==
From the banks of the St. Johns River inland, 4½ miles from downtown Jacksonville, most of the homes in San Jose feature grassy front lawns adorned with bushes and flower beds, shaded by large oaks with draping moss. There are large multi-million-dollar homes on the waterfront, but properties are smaller away from the river, with a range of historic homes from Spanish and Mediterranean Revival to midcentury modern, gated communities and planned developments. The Villages of San Jose, a 1980s development, was built on the site of the defunct Beauclerc Country Club. During the mid-1950s, people of Jewish heritage were not welcome at most Jacksonville clubs, so the BCC was founded as an alternative for followers of Judaism. The Jewish Community Alliance (JCA) is located where the club house and pool once were.

Completed structures in the original development included 4 gatehouses, 30 residences and 3 public buildings. Many of the residences were vacant during the Depression. After World War II, much the area envisioned as San Jose was purchased by Stockton, Whatley, Davin & Co., then re-platted. The construction of I-95 in the 1960s, a few miles east of San Jose, transformed a rural area into the city's Southside. It shifted development away from San Jose, preserving it as primarily a residential area. As of 2025, there were 21 original San Jose Estates residences remaining, constructed in the Mediterranean Revival-style. Modern development has filled in the 100-year-old neighborhood. The only commercial building from San Jose Estates still functioning as it was intended is the San Jose Country Clubhouse.

In the 1930s, the San Jose Estates Administration building continued to be a gas station and a casino. Philanthropist Jessie Ball duPont purchased the Administration buildings and land, offering them for a new Episcopal Church congregation. Grace Chapel became a parish in 1941 before changing their name to San Jose Episcopal Church.

Bolles Hall at the Bolles School has occupied the San Jose Hotel for over 90 years. The Alfred E. DuPont Junior High School now stands where a school was planned.

Parks include Nathan Krestul Park, Verona Park, San Jose Acre Park, Jax Marathon Park, Alejandro Garces Camp Tomahawk Park, Crabtree Park, Balis Park, Baker Skinner Park, Greenridge Road Park and Earl Johnson Park.

San Jose Hotel

San Jose Golf Course

San Jose Estates Administration

San Jose Residence

San Jose Entrance

San Jose Gatehouse

== See also ==
- Neighborhoods of Jacksonville
- Southside, Jacksonville
- Epping Forest (Jacksonville)
- The Bolles School
- San Jose Episcopal Church
