= List of presidential trips made by Gerald Ford (1975) =

Wikimedia list article

This is a list of presidential trips made by Gerald Ford during 1975, the second and first full year of his presidency as the 38th president of the United States. International trips are highlighted in blue.

This list excludes trips made within Washington, D.C., the U.S. federal capital in which the White House, the official residence and principal workplace of the president, is located. It also excludes the capital's immediate surroundings in Maryland and Virginia, such as Andrews Air Force Base in Maryland, where the president typically boards Air Force One for all trips outside the area. Also excluded are trips to Camp David, the country residence of the president.

== January ==
State or country	Areas visited	Dates	Details
Colorado	Vail, Rifle	January 1–2	Vacation at the home of Richard Bass.

== February ==
State or country	Areas visited	Dates	Details
Georgia	Atlanta	February 3–4	Attended the White House Conference on Domestic and Economic Affairs at the Hyatt Regency Atlanta, where he stayed overnight. Addressed the Opportunities Industrialization Centers of America convention at the Marriott Hotel.
Texas	Houston	February 10–11	Addressed the Houston Chamber of Commerce Energy/Economic Conference at the Shamrock Hilton, where he stayed overnight.
Kansas	Topeka	February 11	Addressed a joint session of the Kansas Legislature at the Kansas State Capitol. Met with Midwestern state governors at the Kansas governor's mansion, Cedar Crest. Attended a reception for Kansas Republicans and held a press conference at the Ramada Inn.
New York	New York	February 13	Met with the New York Society of Security Analysts at their headquarters on William Street. Attended a dinner honoring Vice President Nelson Rockefeller at the Waldorf Astoria New York.
Florida	Hollywood, Lauderhill	February 25–26	Briefly visited the Florida Bible College campus. Attended the White House Conference on Domestic and Economic Affairs at the Diplomat Hotel, where he stayed overnight. Attended the Jackie Gleason-Inverrary Classic at the Inverrary Country Club.

== March ==
State or country	Areas visited	Dates	Details
Indiana	Notre Dame	March 17	Gave a convocation address at the University of Notre Dame's Athletic & Convocation Center. Met with the presidents of Big Ten Conference universities and other Indiana colleges at the Morris Inn at Notre Dame. Held a press conference at the Continuing Education Center. Met with the governors of six states at Memorial Library.
California	Rancho Mirage	March 29–April 7	Vacation. Stayed at the home of Transworld Insurance Brokers president Fred C. Wilson.
California	Kern County	March 31	Toured the Naval Petroleum Reserve No. 1.

== April ==
State or country	Areas visited	Dates	Details
California	San Diego	April 3	Held a press conference at the Little America Westgate Plaza Hotel. Attended at the White House Conference on Domestic and Economic Affairs at the El Cortez Convention Center. Ate dinner at the Naval Training Center San Diego mess hall.
California	Geyserville	April 4	Toured The Geysers geothermal power plant.
California	San Francisco	April 4	Addressed the Bay Area Council dinner at the St. Francis Hotel.
California	San Francisco	April 5	Participated in Operation Babylift, carrying children evacuated from Saigon from planes to transport buses at San Francisco International Airport.
Nevada	Las Vegas	April 7	Addressed the National Association of Broadcasters convention at the Las Vegas Hilton.
New Hampshire	Manchester, Concord	April 18	Motorcade from Grenier Field, through downtown Manchester, to Concord. Addressed a joint session of the New Hampshire General Court at the New Hampshire State House. Attended the White House Conference on Domestic and Economic Affairs at the Highway Hotel.
Massachusetts	Boston, Concord, Lexington	April 18–19	Commemorated the 200th anniversary of the Battles of Lexington and Concord. Placed three lanterns in the steeple of Old North Church. Stayed at the Colonnade Hotel in Boston. Visited Fenn School in Concord. Attended ceremonies at the sites of the battles, Old North Bridge and Lexington Battle Green.
Louisiana	New Orleans	April 23	Attended the groundbreaking ceremony for the F. Edward Hébert Library. Addressed the Navy League of the United States convention at the Fairmont New Orleans. Toured the New Era, an offshore oil platform. Gave a convocation address at Tulane University's Devlin Fieldhouse.
Connecticut	New Haven	April 25	Gave a convocation address at Yale Law School, at a dinner marking the school's sesquicentennial, at Woolsey Hall.

== May ==
State or country	Areas visited	Dates	Details
Virginia	Norfolk	May 3	Participated in the commissioning ceremony for the USS Nimitz at Naval Station Norfolk.
Pennsylvania	Philadelphia	May 18	Attended a luncheon at the Penn Museum. Gave the commencement address for the University of Pennsylvania at Philadelphia Civic Center. Attended a Republican reception at the Philadelphia Marriott Motor Hotel.
North Carolina	Charlotte	May 20	Attended the Freedom Day celebration, marking the claimed 200th anniversary of the historically disputed Mecklenburg Declaration of Independence, at Freedom Park.
Belgium	Brussels	May 28–31	Attended the 1975 NATO summit. Addressed the North Atlantic Council and met separately with NATO heads of state and government.
Spain	Madrid	May 31–June 1	Met with Generalissimo Francisco Franco. Received keys to city from Mayor of Madrid.

== June ==
State or country	Areas visited	Dates	Details
Austria	Salzburg	June 1–3	Met with Chancellor Bruno Kreisky and Egyptian President Anwar Sadat.
Italy	Rome	June 3	Met with President Giovanni Leone and Prime Minister Aldo Moro.
Vatican City	Apostolic Palace	June 3	Audience with Pope Paul VI.
New York	West Point	June 4	Gave the commencement address at the United States Military Academy's Michie Stadium.
Georgia	Columbus	June 14	Attended a ceremony celebrating the bicentennial of the founding of the United States Army at Fort Benning. Attended a Republican reception at the Holiday Inn North.

== July ==
State or country	Areas visited	Dates	Details
Ohio	Cincinnati, Cleveland	July 3	Dedicated the National Environmental Research Center. Attended the White House Conference on Domestic and Economic Affairs at the Greater Cincinnati Convention and Exposition Center. Attended a Republican reception at the Sheraton-Cleveland Hotel.
Maryland	Baltimore	July 4	Celebrated Independence Day at Fort McHenry National Monument.
Michigan	Traverse City	July 11	Participated in the National Cherry Festival Parade.
Illinois	Chicago	July 11–12	Attended a Mid-America Committee dinner at the Palmer House Hotel, where he stayed overnight. Gave the commencement address for Chicago State University at the Arie Crown Theater.
Michigan	Traverse City, Interlochen, Mackinac Island	July 12–13	Participated in the Walter Hagen Invitational Golf Tournament at the Traverse City Golf and Country Club. Attended a performance by the National High School Band at the Interlochen Arts Academy. Stayed at the Michigan Governor's Summer Residence on Mackinac Island. Addressed the Sixth Circuit Judicial Conference at the Grand Hotel. Attended service at Trinity Episcopal Church. Toured Fort Mackinac.
West Germany	Bonn, Linz am Rhein	July 26–28	Met with President Walter Scheel and Chancellor Helmut Schmidt.
Poland	Warsaw, Kraków	July 28–29	Official visit. Met with First Secretary Edward Gierek.
Finland	Helsinki	July 29–August 2	Attended opening session of the Conference on Security and Cooperation in Europe. Met with the heads of state and government of Finland, Great Britain, Turkey, West Germany, France, Italy and Spain. Also met with Soviet General Secretary Brezhnev. Signed the final act of the conference.

== August ==
State or country	Areas visited	Dates	Details
Romania	Bucharest, Sinaia	August 2–3	Official visit. Met with President Nicolae Ceaușescu.
Yugoslavia	Belgrade	August 3–4	Official visit. Met with President Josip Broz Tito and Prime Minister Džemal Bijedić.
Arkansas	Fort Smith	August 10	Dedicated the St. Edward Mercy Medical Center. Toured the Operation New Arrivals facility for refugees from the Vietnam War at Fort Chaffee. Attended a Republican reception at the Sheraton Inn.
Colorado	Vail, Rifle	August 10–24	Summer vacation at the home of Richard Bass. Attended the Vail Symposium at the Eagle's Nest restaurant at Vail Ski Resort. Toured a Paraho shale oil development in Rifle.
Iowa	Des Moines	August 18	Visited the Iowa State Fair. Attended a Republican reception at the Hotel Fort Des Moines.
Minnesota	Bloomington, Minneapolis	August 18–19	Stayed at L'Hotel Sofitel in Bloomington. Addressed the American Legion convention at the Minneapolis Auditorium. Attended Republican receptions at the Bloomington Marriott and Registry Hotel.
Illinois	Pekin, Peoria	August 19	Dedicated the Everett McKinley Dirksen Congressional Leadership Research Center at the Pekin Public Library. Attended the White House Conference on Domestic and Economic Affairs at the Peoria Hilton.
Montana	Libby	August 24	Dedicated the Libby Dam.
Illinois	Chicago	August 24–25	Attended a dinner for Star World Championship sailors at the Chicago Yacht Club. Stayed at the Palmer House Hotel. Addressed the American Hardware Manufacturers Association convention at the Arie Crown Theater.
Wisconsin	Milwaukee	August 25	Attended the White House Conference on Domestic and Economic Affairs at The Pfister Hotel.
Maine	Augusta, Portland	August 30	Attended an AFL-CIO Field Day at the Augusta Civic Center. Attended a Republican reception at the Holiday Inn in Portland.
Rhode Island	Newport	August 30	Attended Republican receptions at the Sheraton-Islander Inn on Goat Island and the home of John J. Slocum.

== September ==
State or country	Areas visited	Dates	Details
Washington	Seattle	September 4	Attended a Republican reception at the Seattle Center Exhibition Hall. Toured the new Fred Hutchinson Cancer Research Center building. Attended the White House Conference on Domestic and Economic Affairs at the Olympic Hotel.
Oregon	Portland	September 4	Attended a Republican reception at the Sheraton-Portland Hotel. Addressed the Portland Youth Bicentennial Rally at the Portland Memorial Coliseum.
California	Sacramento	September 4–5	Stayed at the Senator Hotel. Attended the Sacramento Host Breakfast at the Sacramento Community Convention Center. Addressed a joint session of the California State Legislature at the State Capitol. As Ford walked from the hotel to the Capitol, Lynette "Squeaky" Fromme attempted to assassinate him, but her gun did not fire and Ford was unharmed.
New Hampshire	Keene	September 11	Visited the campaign headquarters of Representative Louis C. Wyman for Senate. Spoke at Keene Center.
New Hampshire	Marlborough	September 11	Greeted local officials during a brief motorcade stop.
New Hampshire	Dublin	September 11	Toured the Yankee Publication Company. Viewed three horse-drawn carriages at Bonds Corner.
New Hampshire	Peterborough	September 11	Interviewed at WSCV/WSLE-FM radio studios. Spoke at Peterborough Town Center.
New Hampshire	Wilton	September 11	Spoke during a brief motorcade stop.
New Hampshire	Milford	September 11	Toured Hitchner Manufacturing Company. Visited Bales Elementary School. Spoke at Milford Town Square.
New Hampshire	Amherst	September 11	Visited a local residence. Spoke at Amherst Town Center.
New Hampshire	Nashua	September 11	Visited Amherst Street Elementary School. Viewed the Circus Vargas parade. Toured Sanders Manufacturing Company.
New Hampshire	Hudson	September 11	Spoke during a brief motorcade stop.
New Hampshire	Windham	September 11	Visited Windham Center School.
New Hampshire	Salem	September 11	Greeted local officials during a brief motorcade stop.
New Hampshire	Hampstead	September 11	Greeted local officials during a brief motorcade stop.
New Hampshire	Kingston	September 11	Visited Daniel J. Bakie Elementary School.
New Hampshire	Exeter	September 11	Visited Exeter Town Square.
New Hampshire	Portsmouth	September 11	Spoke at Portsmouth Town Square.
Missouri	St. Louis	September 12	Interviewed at KMOX-TV studios. Addressed the National Baptist Convention at the Kiel Auditorium. Attended a Republican reception at the Bel Air Hilton. Attended the White House Conference on Domestic and Economic Affairs at Stouffer's Riverfront Inn.
Kansas	Overland Park	September 12	Addressed the Kansas Capitol Club at the Ramada Inn.
Missouri	Kansas City	September 12	Attended a Republican reception at the Almeda Plaza Hotel, where he stayed overnight.
Texas	Dallas, Midland	September 13	Addressed the National Federation of Republican Women convention at the Dallas Convention Center. Attended a Republican reception at the home of Trammell Crow. Gave a convocation address at Southern Methodist University's Moody Coliseum. Toured the university's Bob Hope Theater. Dedicated the Permian Basin Petroleum Museum.
Oklahoma	Oklahoma City	September 19	Visited the Oklahoma State Fair, where he dedicated the Independence Arch and Constitution Fountain. Attended a Republican reception at the Lincoln Plaza Inn.
California	Los Angeles	September 19–20	Stayed at the Century Plaza Hotel.
California	Malibu	September 20	Dedicated Brock House at Pepperdine University.
California	Pebble Beach	September 20–22	Golfed at the Cypress Point Club. Stayed at the home of Leonard Firestone, Ford's ambassador to Belgium.
California	Stanford	September 21	Dedicated the new Stanford Law School building.
California	Anaheim	September 21	Addressed the National Association of Life Underwriters convention at the Anaheim Convention Center.
California	San Francisco	September 22	Addressed the AFL-CIO Building and Construction Trades Department convention at the Hyatt Regency San Francisco. Addressed the World Affairs Council at the St. Francis Hotel. As Ford left the hotel, Sara Jane Moore attempted to assassinate him, but her shot missed, injuring a bystander.
Illinois	Chicago	September 30–October 1	Attended a Republican reception at The Conrad Hilton. Stayed at the North Shore Hilton.

== October ==
State or country	Areas visited	Dates	Details
Nebraska	Omaha	October 1	Attended the White House Conference on Domestic and Economic Affairs at the Omaha Hilton.
West Virginia	Elkins	October 4	Participated in the Mountain State Forest Festival parade starting from Elkins High School. Due to the two recent attempts on his life, Ford rode in the parade in a bulletproof bubble-top limousine.
New Jersey	Newark	October 4	Attended a Republican reception at the Robert Treat Hotel.
Tennessee	Knoxville	October 7	Attended the White House Conference on Domestic and Economic Affairs at the Hyatt Regency hotel.
Michigan	Detroit	October 10	Attended Republican receptions at Hotel Pontchartrain and Cobo Hall.
Connecticut	Hartford	October 14	Addressed the Connecticut Association of Realtors convention and attended a Republican reception at the Sheraton hotel.
California	Los Angeles	October 29–30	Attended a Republican reception at the Century Plaza Hotel, where he stayed overnight.
California	San Francisco	October 30	Attended a Republican reception at the St. Francis Hotel.
Wisconsin	Milwaukee	October 30	Attended a Republican reception at the Milwaukee Performing Arts Center's Bradley Pavilion.

== November ==
State or country	Areas visited	Dates	Details
Florida	Jacksonville	November 2	Rode the USS Yosemite from Naval Air Station Jacksonville to Epping Forest, where Ford held a summit with Egyptian president Anwar Sadat. Dined at the San Jose Country Club.
Massachusetts	Springfield, Boston	November 7	Addressed the New England Society of Newspaper Editors convention at the Baystate West Hotel. Addressed the New England Council conference at the Sheraton-Boston Hotel. Attended a Republican reception at the Museum of Science.
West Virginia	Charleston	November 11	Attended a Republican reception, and inducted 750 Cub Scouts into the Buckskin Council of the Boy Scouts, at the Charleston Civic Center.
North Carolina	Durham, Raleigh	November 14	Gave a convocation address at North Carolina Central University's McDougald–McLendon Arena. Attended a Republican reception at the Royal Villa Hotel in Raleigh.
Georgia	Atlanta	November 14	Attended a Republican reception at the Marriott Motor Hotel.
France	Rambouillet	November 15–17	Attended the 1st G6 summit.
Alaska	Fairbanks	November 29	Toured Trans-Alaska Pipeline System Pump Station No. 8.
Alaska	Anchorage	November 29–30	Attended a birthday party for Senator Ted Stevens at the Westward Hotel, where he stayed overnight.

== December ==
State or country	Areas visited	Dates	Details
China	Peking	December 1–5	Official visit. Met with Party Chairman Mao Zedong and Vice Premier Deng Xiaoping.
Indonesia	Jakarta	December 5–6	Official visit. Met with President Suharto.
Philippines	Manila	December 6–7	Official visit. Met with President Ferdinand Marcos.
Hawaii	Honolulu	December 7	Attended a ceremony at the USS Arizona Memorial commemorating the 34th anniversary of the attack on Pearl Harbor. Addressed University of Hawaiʻi at Mānoa students and faculty at the East–West Center's Kennedy Theatre.
Colorado	Vail	December 23–30	Christmas vacation at the home of Richard Bass.
