= Marsh & Saxelbye =

Florida architectural firm

Marsh & Saxelbye was a Florida architectural firm that designed numerous notable buildings in Florida. More than 20 of their works are preserved and listed on the National Register of Historic Places for their architecture.

== Notable works ==
Project	Location	Completed	Image	Notes
Karpeles Manuscript Library Museum	Springfield, Jacksonville	1921		Formerly First Church of Christian Scientist
Groover-Stewart Drug Company Building	Northbank, Jacksonville	1925		
Schultz Building	Northbank, Jacksonville	1926		Formerly Atlantic National Bank Annex
Hotel George Washington	Northbank, Jacksonville	1926		
Epping Forest	San Jose, Jacksonville	1927		
Greenleaf & Crosby Building	Northbank, Jacksonville	1928		
Title & Trust Company of Florida Building	Northbank, Jacksonville	1929		
Museum of Contemporary Art Jacksonville	Northbank, Jacksonville	1931		Formerly Western Union Telegraph Building
Ed Austin Building	Northbank, Jacksonville	1933		State Attorney's Office, Formerly U.S. Federal Courthouse
Alfred I. DuPont Building	Downtown, Miami	1939		

Other works credited to the firm or to Harold F. Saxelbye include:

- First Church of Christ, Scientist (Jacksonville, Florida)
- San Jose Episcopal Church
- Buckman and Ulmer Building, 29–33 W. Monroe St. Jacksonville FL (Marsh & Saxelbye) NRHP-listed
- Casa Marina Hotel, 12 Sixth Ave., N. Jacksonville Beach FL (Marsh and Saxelbye) NRHP-listed
- House at 3325 Via de la Reina, 3325 Via de la Reiva Jacksonville FL (Marsh & Saxelbye) NRHP-listed
- House at 3335 Via de la Reina, 3335 Via de la Reina Jacksonville FL (Marsh & Saxelbye) NRHP-listed
- House at 3500 Via de la Reina, 3500 Via de la Reina Jacksonville FL (Marsh & Saxelbye) NRHP-listed
- House at 3609 Via de la Reina, 3609 Via de la Reina Jacksonville FL (Marsh & Saxelbye) NRHP-listed
- House at 3685 Via de la Reina, 3685 Via de la Reina Jacksonville FL (Marsh & Saxelbye) NRHP-listed
- House at 3703 Via de la Reina, 3703 Via de la Reina Jacksonville FL (Marsh & Saxelbye) NRHP-listed
- House at 3764 Ponce de Leon Avenue, 3764 Ponce de Leon Ave. Jacksonville FL (Marsh & Saxelbye) NRHP-listed
- House at 7144 Madrid Avenue, 7144 Madrid Ave. Jacksonville FL (Marsh & Saxelbye) NRHP-listed
- House at 7207 Ventura Avenue, 7207 Ventura Ave. Jacksonville FL (Marsh & Saxelbye) NRHP-listed
- House at 7217 Ventura Avenue, 7217 Ventura Ave. Jacksonville FL (Marsh & Saxelbye) NRHP-listed
- House at 7227 San Pedro, 7227 San Pedro Rd. Jacksonville FL (Marsh & Saxelbye) NRHP-listed
- House at 7245 San Jose Boulevard, 7245 San Jose Blvd. Jacksonville FL (Marsh & Saxelbye) NRHP-listed
- House at 7246 San Carlos, 7246 San Carlos Jacksonville FL (Marsh & Saxelbye) NRHP-listed
- House at 7246 St. Augustine Road, 7246 St. Augustine Rd. Jacksonville FL (Marsh & Saxelbye) NRHP-listed
- House at 7249 San Pedro, 7249 San Pedro Rd. Jacksonville FL (Marsh & Saxelbye) NRHP-listed
- House at 7288 San Jose Boulevard, 7288 San Jose Blvd. Jacksonville FL (Marsh & Saxelbye) NRHP-listed
- House at 7306 St. Augustine Road, 7306 St. Augustine Rd. Jacksonville FL (Marsh & Saxelbye) NRHP-listed
- House at 7317 San Jose Boulevard, 7317 San Jose Blvd. Jacksonville FL (Marsh & Saxelbye) NRHP-listed
- House at 7330 Ventura Avenue, 7330 Ventura Ave. Jacksonville FL (Marsh & Saxelbye) NRHP-listed
- House at 7400 San Jose Boulevard, 7400 San Jose Blvd., Jacksonville, FL (Marsh & Saxelbye) NRHP-listed
- Lane-Towers House, 3730 Richmond St. Jacksonville FL (Saxelbe, Harold) NRHP-listed
- San Jose Administration Building, 7423 San Jose Blvd. Jacksonville FL) NRHP-listed
- San Jose Country Club, 7529 San Jose Blvd. Jacksonville FL) NRHP-listed
- San Jose Estates Gatehouse, 1873 Christopher Point Rd., North Jacksonville FL) NRHP-listed
- San Jose Hotel, 7400 San Jose Boulevard Jacksonville FL) NRHP-listed
- South Atlantic Investment Corporation Building, 35–39 W. Monroe St. Jacksonville FL) NRHP-listed
- Stockton, Whatley & Davin Building, Life of the South, 100 West Bay St. Jacksonville
- Village Store, 4216, 4212, 4208 Oxford Ave., 2906 and 2902 Corinthian Ave. Jacksonville FL, (Saxelbye, Harold F.) NRHP-listed
- Wakulla Springs Archeological and Historic District, 1 Spring Dr. Wakulla Springs FL, (Marsh & Saxelbye) NRHP-listed

== See also ==
- Architecture of Jacksonville
