= Marabanong =

- U.S. National Register of Historic Places
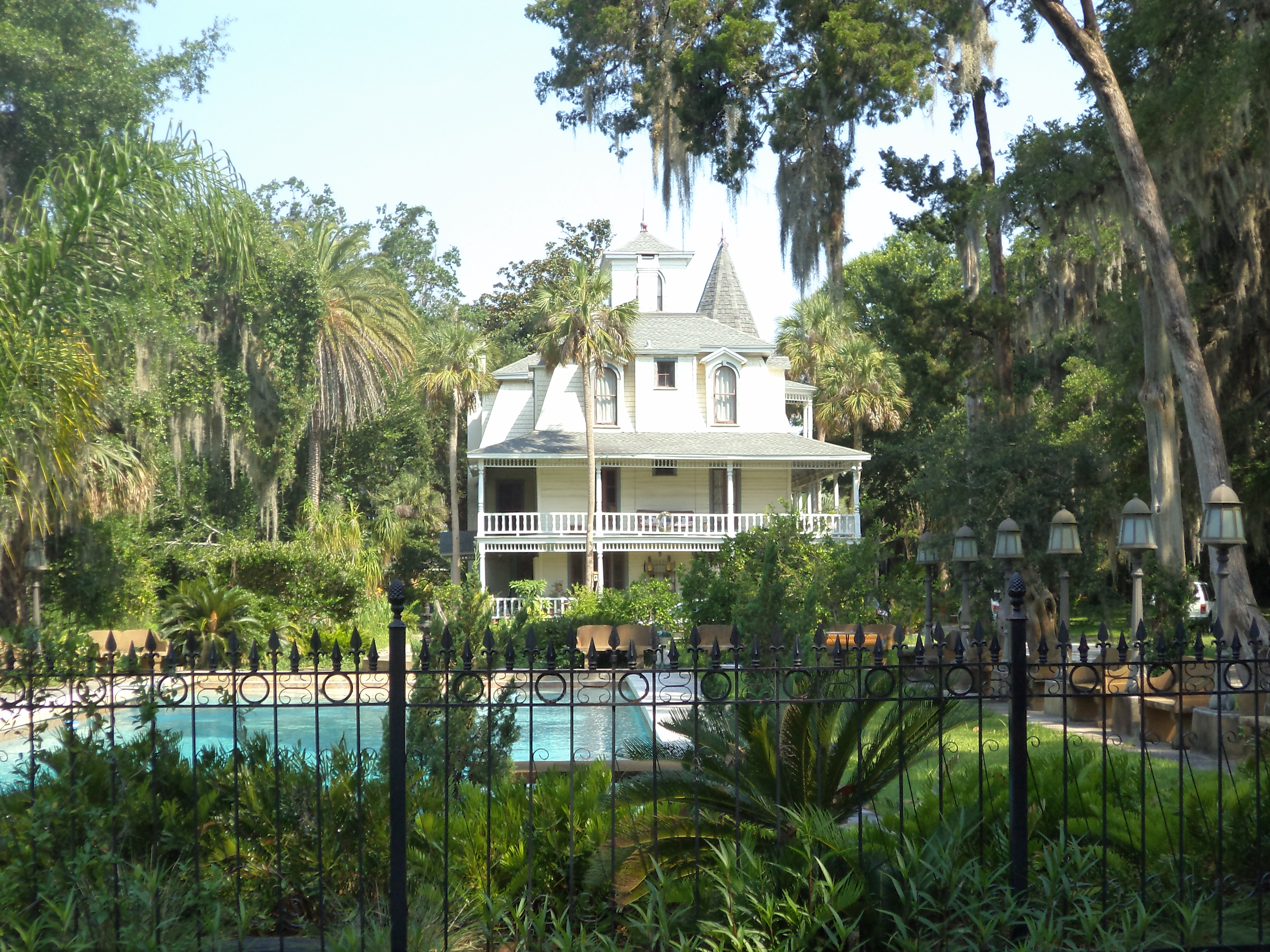

- Location within Florida Location within the United States
- Location: Jacksonville, Florida
- Coordinates: 30.313775°N 81.617753°W
- Built: 1876
- NRHP reference No.: 13000899
- Added to NRHP: December 11, 2013

Marabanong is a historic mansion in Jacksonville, Florida, United States. It was built in 1876 on the site of Perley Place, the antebellum mansion purchased in 1870 by British astronomer Thomas Basnett that was originally built by Thomas Perley and destroyed in a fire. It was added to the National Register of Historic Places on December 11, 2013. Eliza Wilbur was active at the home.

Basnett (born 1808 - died 1886) was a prominent British astronomer and meteorologist. Basnett moved from England to Illinois in 1835 and ran a drugstore. In 1876 he constructed Marabonong on a promontory above the St. Johns River near Jacksonville, Florida. He married Eliza Wilbur in his third marriage.

== See also ==
- National Register of Historic Places listings in Duval County, Florida
