= Eliza Wilbur =

American astronomer

- Born: October 21, 1851
- Died: March 31, 1930 (aged 78)
- Other name: Eban Malcolm Sutcliffe
- Education: Batavia Female Seminary
- Occupations: Astronomer, botanist, inventor
- Known for: Her patents included three for telescopes
- Spouse(s): 1. Thomas Basnett; 2. Mathieu Souvielle

Eliza Madelina Wilbur Souvielle (October 21, 1851 – March 31, 1930) was an American scientist, astronomer, botanist, inventor, author and publisher.

== Education, academia and publishing ==
She studied at Batavia Female Seminary in New York and may have been the first female to lecture in science at Harvard University. She was a member of the American Association for the Advancement of Science and her work was published in magazines and newspapers including Scientific American and the New York Herald. She published Continuity (magazine).

== Personal life ==
Wilbur was the third wife of Thomas Basnett and moved to Marabanong (a historic mansion in Jacksonville, Florida) in 1880. She invented a large astronomical telescope there. (In 1914, the house was sold to Eliza's cousin, Grace Wilbur Trout.) After Basnett's death in 1886, she married Mathieu Souvielle, a throat and lung surgeon.

== Pseudonymous writing ==
She wrote Sequel to the Parliament of Religion about non-Western religions under the pseudonym Eban Malcolm Sutcliffe and The Ulyssiad (Dacosta Publishing Co. of Jacksonville, 1896), a biography of Ulysses Grant in verse.

== Other interests ==
She was active in the women's suffrage campaign, served as secretary for the Home for the Aged in Jacksonville for seven years, and was vice president of the Jacksonville Branch of the League of American Pen Women. Her patents included three for telescopes. She was also involved in efforts to engineer an airplane.
