= Thomas Basnett =

British astronomer and meteorologist

- Born: 1808
- Died: 1886 (aged 77–78)
- Occupation(s): British astronomer and meteorologist
- Known for: Marabanong mansion

Thomas Basnett (1808–1886) was a British-born astronomer and meteorologist. He built Marabanong in the Jacksonville, Florida area and married Eliza Wilbur in his third marriage. Basnett moved from England to Illinois in 1835 and ran a drugstore. Circa 1876 he constructed Marabonong on a promontory above the St. Johns River near Jacksonville, Florida
