= Greenleaf & Crosby Building =

- U.S. National Register of Historic Places
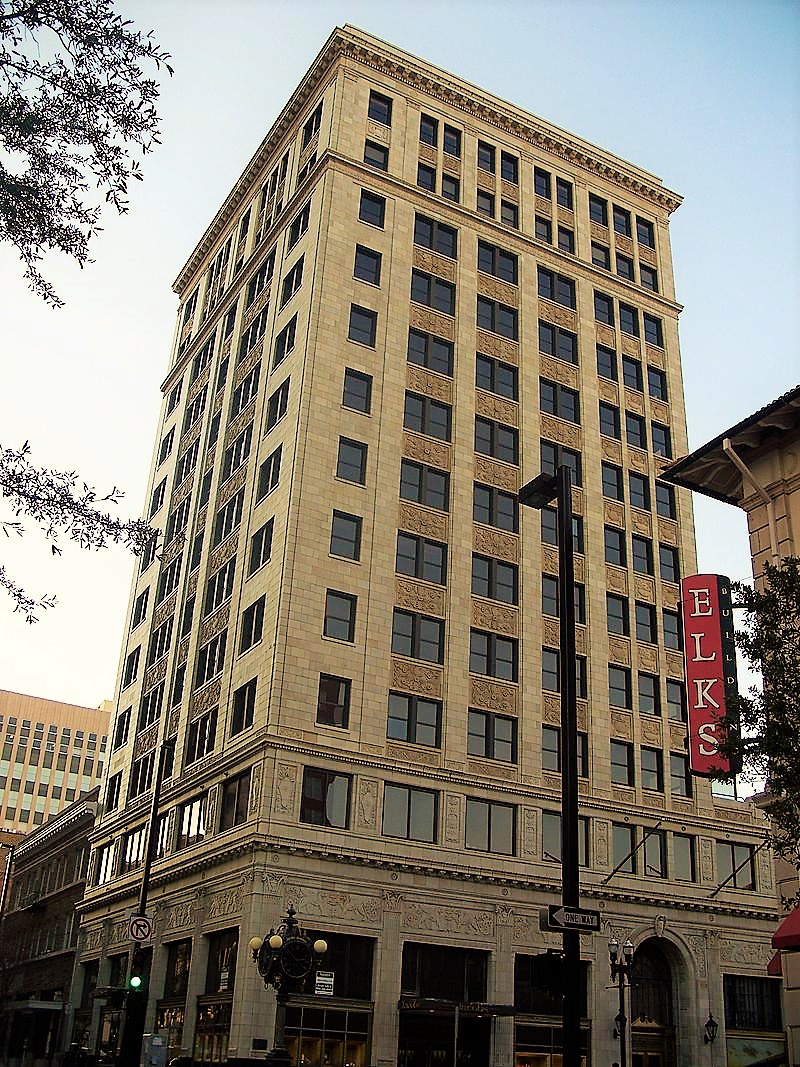

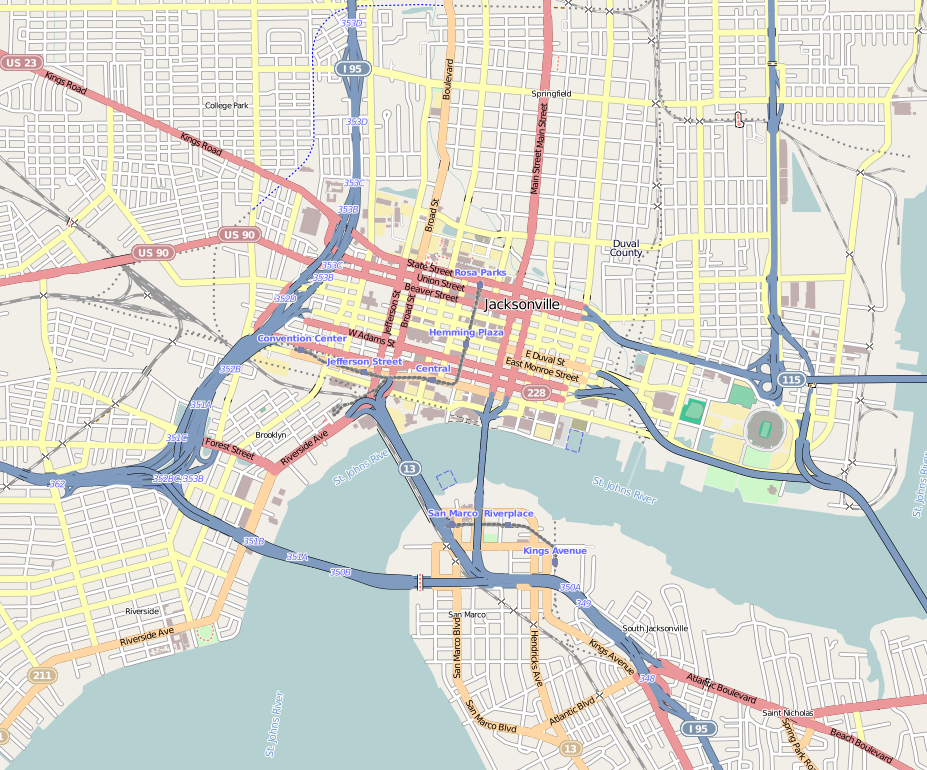
- Location within Central Jacksonville Location within Florida
- Location: Jacksonville, Florida, USA
- Coordinates: 30.3283°N 81.6591°W
- Area: less than one acre
- Built: 1928
- Architect: Marsh & Saxelbye; O.P. Woodcock
- Architectural style: Chicago School
- MPS: Downtown Jacksonville MPS
- NRHP reference No.: 05000139
- Added to NRHP: March 15, 2005

The Greenleaf & Crosby Building is a historic site in Jacksonville, Florida. It is located at 208 N Laura Street. The antique Greenleaf Clock is on the corner - it was moved from the company's original location and has been refurbished multiple times. On March 15, 2005, it was added to the U.S. National Register of Historic Places.

== See also ==
- Architecture of Jacksonville
