= South Jacksonville Grammar School =

- U.S. National Register of Historic Places
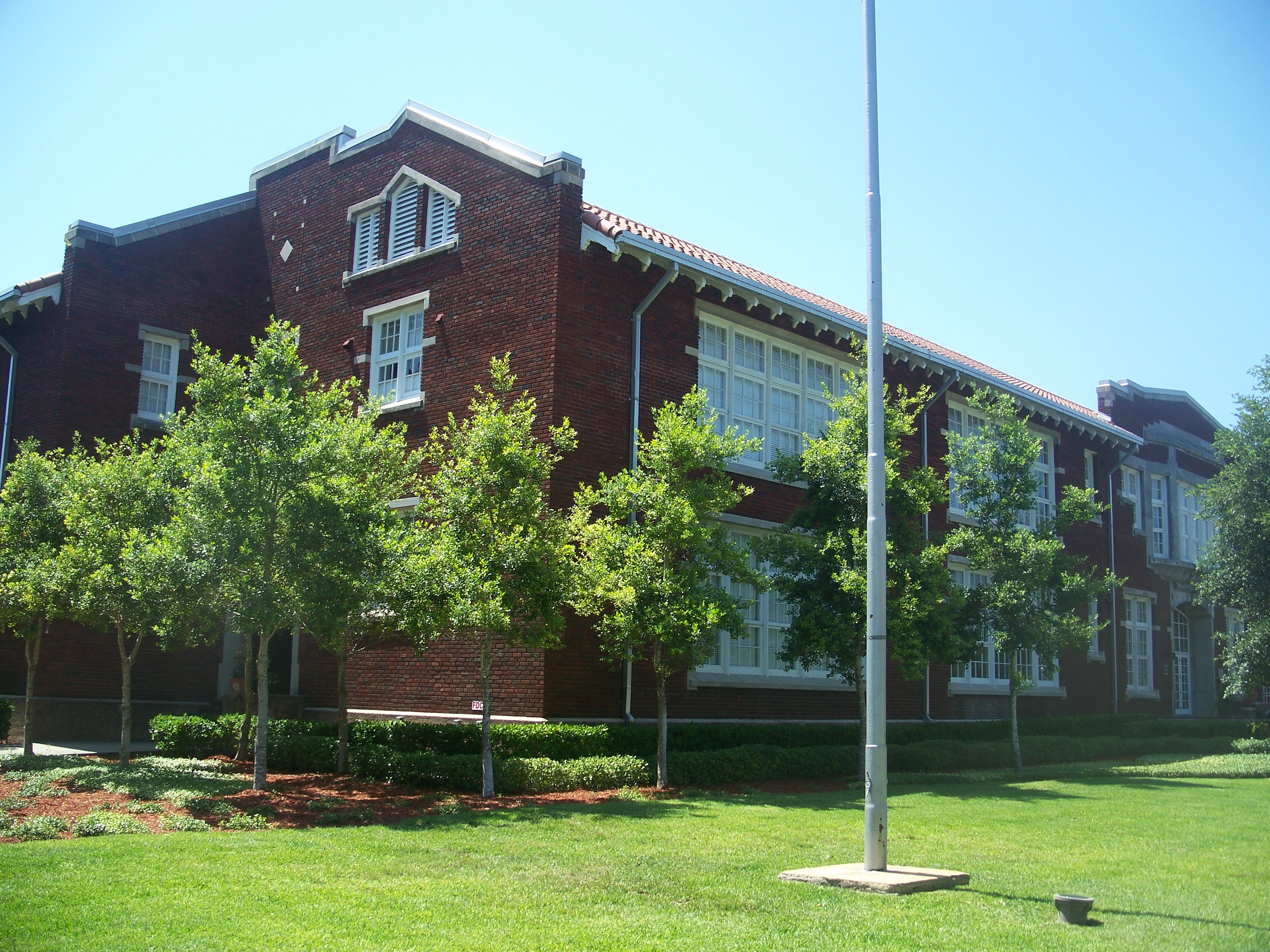

- Location within Florida Location within the United States
- Location: Jacksonville, Duval County, Florida
- Coordinates: 30°18′39″N 81°39′28″W
- Built: 1916
- Architectural style: Late 19th And 20th Century Revivals
- NRHP reference No.: 04000278
- Added to NRHP: April 15, 2004

The South Jacksonville Grammar School (also known as The Lofts San Marco) is a historical school building in Jacksonville, Florida, United States. It is located at 1450 Flagler Avenue. On April 15, 2004, it was added to the U.S. National Register of Historical Places.
