= John S. Sammis House =

Historic home in Florida, United States

- U.S. National Register of Historic Places
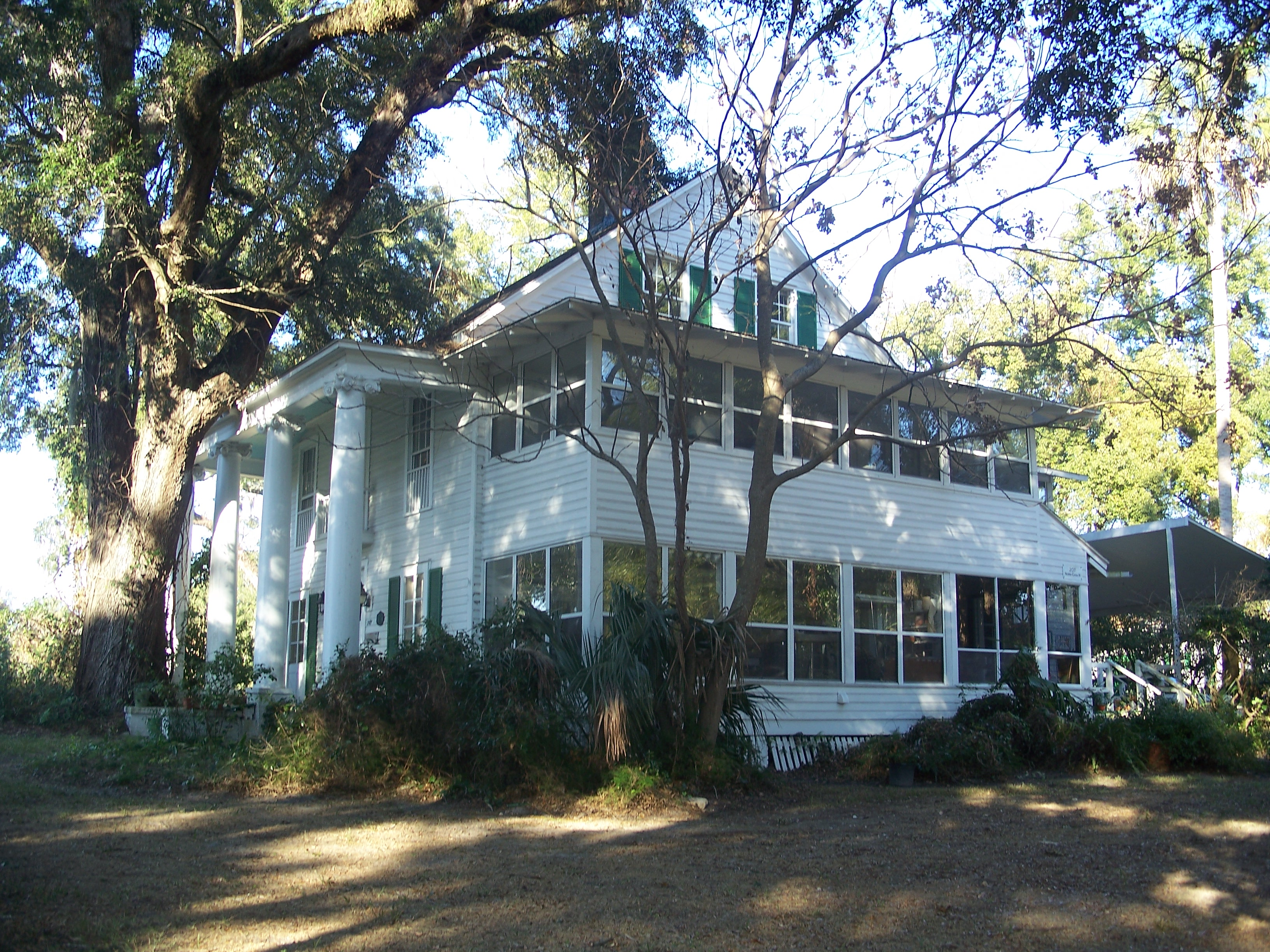

- Location within Florida Location within the United States
- Location: Jacksonville, Florida, USA
- Coordinates: 30°19′19″N 81°36′44″W
- Architectural style: Classical Revival
- NRHP reference No.: 79000669
- Added to NRHP: July 10, 1979

The John S. Sammis House (also known as the Arlington Bluff House) is a historic home in Jacksonville, Florida. It is located at 207 Noble Circle West. On July 10, 1979, it was added to the U.S. National Register of Historic Places.
