= Jacksonville Jewish Center =

Conservative synagogue in Florida, US

Religion
- Affiliation: Conservative Judaism
- Ecclesiastical or organizational status: Synagogue
- Status: Active

Location
- Location: Jacksonville, Florida, United States
- Country: United States
- Interactive map of Jacksonville Jewish Center
- Coordinates: 30.1936°N 81.6211°W

The Jacksonville Jewish Center is a Conservative synagogue in Jacksonville, Florida. Founded in 1901, it is one of the largest Jewish congregations in Northeast Florida and serves as a center for religious worship, education, and community life. The synagogue is affiliated with the United Synagogue of Conservative Judaism.

== History ==
The Jacksonville Jewish Center was formed by Orthodox Jewish families in Jacksonville, Florida, and incorporated as the Hebrew Orthodox Congregation B'nai Israel in 1901. The congregation grew and a synagogue was built at the corner of Jefferson and Duval Streets in 1907.

In 1927 a larger building was constructed at the corner of Third and Silver Streets in Springfield. The congregation adopted the name Jacksonville Jewish Center. The center expanded over the next 35 years. By 1959 there were three large buildings, housing a sanctuary, chapel, library, social hall, school, auditorium, offices, and other meeting rooms.

In 1963 the center began moving to a new site at 3662 Crown Point Road in Mandarin. The official move to the new location occurred in 1976.

=== Civil rights and community activism ===
During the late 1950s and early 1960s, the Jacksonville Jewish Center was affected by racial and social tensions associated with the civil rights movement. The congregation supported social justice efforts, including desegregation and the end of racial discrimination in the South. In 1958, the Center was bombed along with a local Black school, destroying its doors and leaving a crater at the main entrance. In 1960, swastikas were painted on the building by local youths. Despite these incidents, the local Jewish community remained supportive of civil rights activities and desegregation of public schools and accommodations throughout the 1960s.

=== Expansion of opportunities for women ===
The Jacksonville Jewish Center also developed programs that reflected expanded roles for women within the congregation. Its religious education programs included both boys and girls, and girls were able to participate in Bat Mitzvah ceremonies, marking the first congregation in Jacksonville to offer such a program. These changes represented a shift from earlier Orthodox practices and aligned with broader developments in Conservative Judaism.

=== Fate of former Springfield location ===
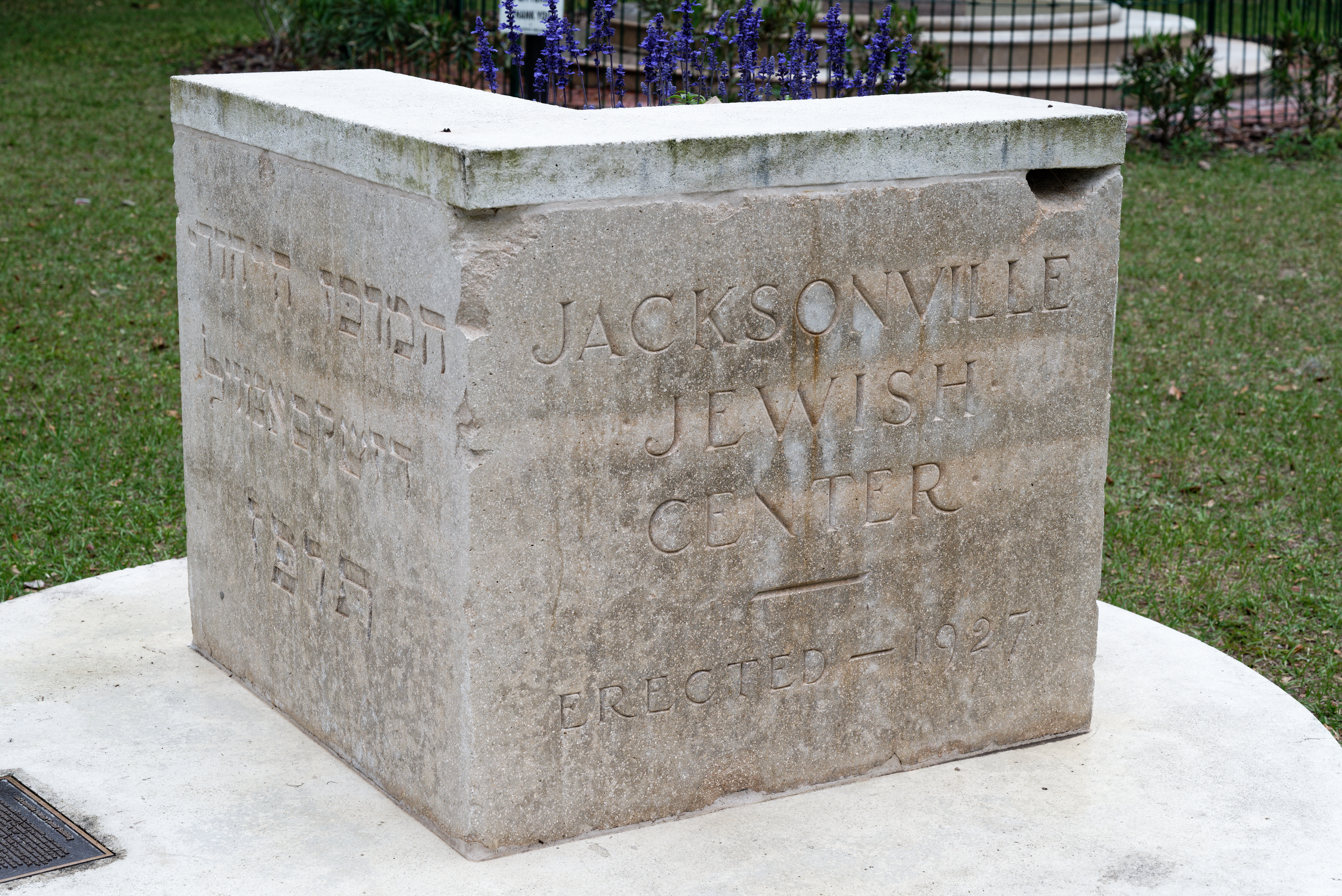
Cornerstone

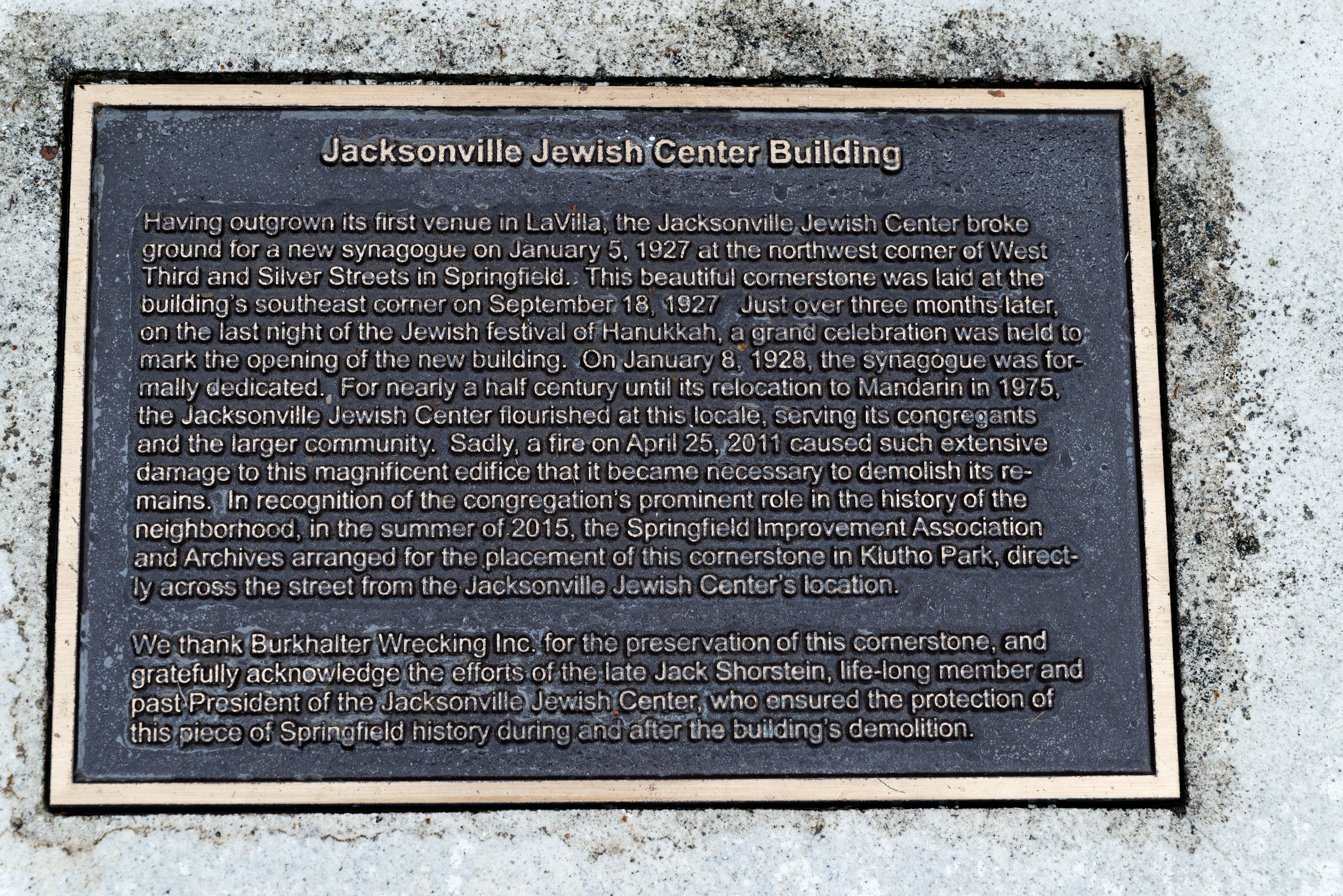
Plaque on cornerstone

Following the relocation, the former Springfield facilities were used by the Jacksonville Job Corps starting in 1976. The historic center was nominated for the National Register of Historic Places in 2010 and added to the list in 2021. A fire in 2011 damaged the original building, which was subsequently demolished. The cornerstone of the building was preserved and moved to Klutho Park on the opposite side of Third Street.

=== Recent history ===
The Jacksonville Jewish Center remains an active congregation, offering daily morning and evening services, weekly Shabbat services, High Holiday services, and live streaming.

In 2025, beloved Rabbi Shira Rosenblum departed from the congregation and was succeeded by Rabbi Kaylie Romano as associate rabbi.

== Campus ==
The Jacksonville Jewish Center campus spans approximately 34 acres in the Mandarin area of Jacksonville. The campus includes a sanctuary, classrooms, administrative offices, and recreational facilities.

Outdoor amenities include a swimming pool, basketball courts, pickleball courts, athletic fields, playgrounds, and a gaga pit used for youth programming.

== Education ==
The Jacksonville Jewish Center operates educational programs under the Galinsky Academy.

=== Laurie Preschool ===
Laurie Preschool provides early childhood education.

=== Martin J. Gottlieb Day School ===
The Martin J. Gottlieb Day School is a full-time Jewish day school serving students in kindergarten through eighth grade.

=== Bernard & Alice Selevan Religious School ===
The Bernard & Alice Selevan Religious School provides part-time Jewish education for students in kindergarten through eighth grade.

== Youth programs ==
Youth programming at the Jacksonville Jewish Center is organized through Setzer Youth Education and includes:

- Halutzim — grades 2–5
- Kadima — grades 5–8
- United Synagogue Youth (USY) — grades 8–12
- JTLI (Jewish Teen Leadership Institute) — grades 8–12

Youth programming is directed by Jacob Ruby. The congregation’s USY chapter is led by student presidents Harry Aaronson and Ben Levinson.

== Religious life ==
The Jacksonville Jewish Center practices Conservative Judaism and is affiliated with the United Synagogue of Conservative Judaism.

The congregation holds daily morning and evening minyan services, weekly Shabbat services on Saturdays, and services for Jewish holidays, including the High Holidays. Services are also available via live streaming.

== Leadership and clergy ==
The synagogue is led by:

- Rabbi Jonathan Lubliner — Senior Rabbi
- Rabbi Kaylie Romano — Associate Rabbi
- Hazzan Jesse Holzer

Lay leadership includes Erik Rostholder, who serves as president, and administrative operations are led by Executive Director Jennifer Smith.

== Community and programming ==
The Jacksonville Jewish Center hosts religious services, lifecycle events, educational programming, youth activities, cultural events, and community gatherings throughout the year.

== Cemetery ==
The Jacksonville Jewish Center maintains burial sections at Evergreen Cemetery in Jacksonville and also serves as custodian of Beth Shalom Cemetery.

== Catering ==
The synagogue operates in-house kosher catering services for events held on campus.

== See also ==
- List of synagogues in the United States
