= South Atlantic Investment Corporation Building =

- Formerly listed on the U.S. National Register of Historic Places
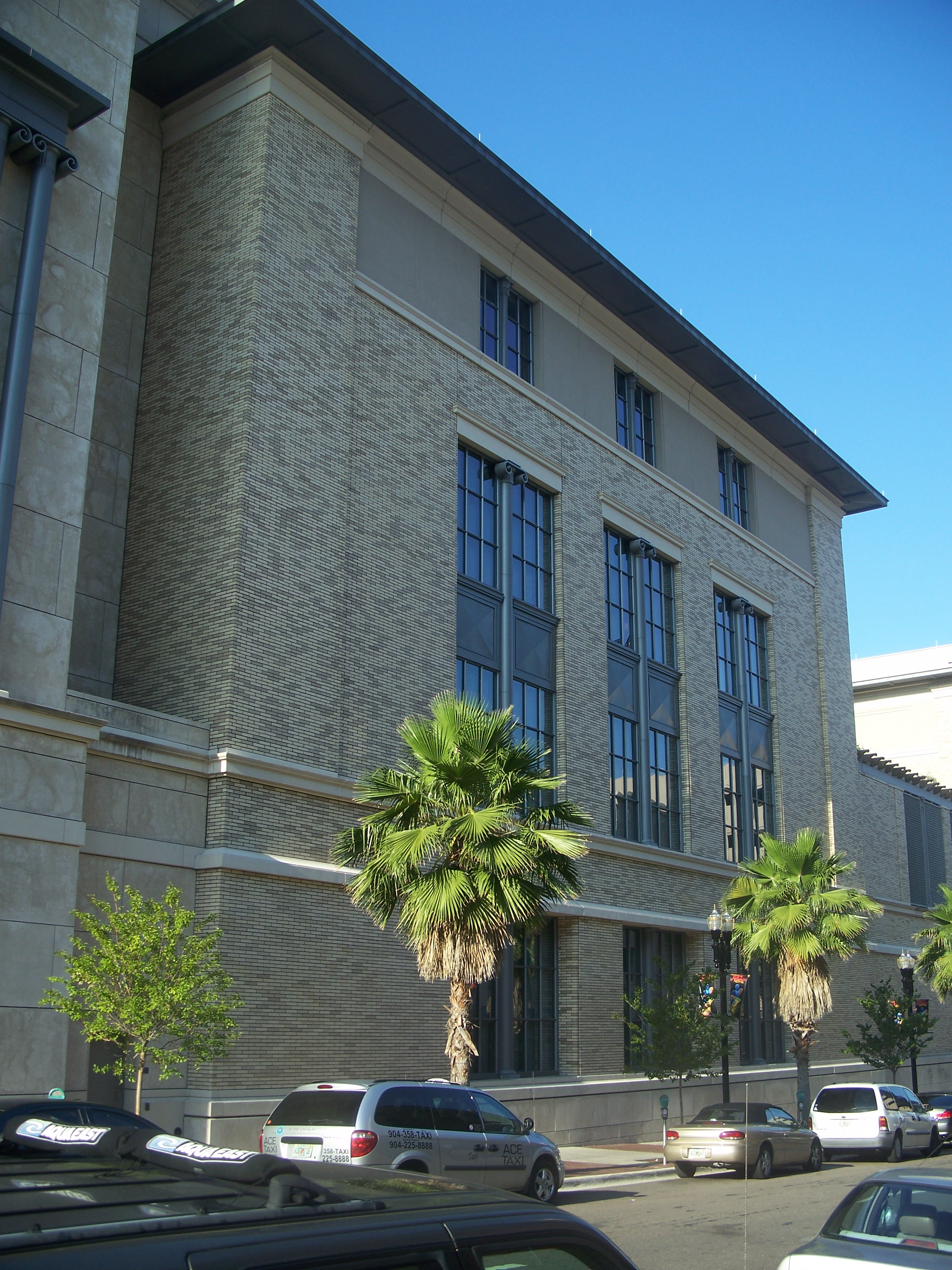
- Downtown library, built on site of demolished building

- Location within Florida Location within the United States
- Location: Jacksonville, Florida, USA
- Coordinates: 30°19′43″N 81°39′8″W
- Area: less than one acre
- Built: 1925
- Architect: Marsh & Saxelbye
- Architectural style: Late 19th And 20th Century Revivals
- MPS: Downtown Jacksonville MPS
- NRHP reference No.: 92001699

Significant dates
- Added to NRHP: December 30, 1992
- Removed from NRHP: August 22, 2023

The South Atlantic Investment Corporation Building was a historic building in Jacksonville, Florida, United States. It was built in 1925 for the South Atlantic Investment Corporation, and was located at 35-39 West Monroe Street. On December 30, 1992, it was added to the U.S. National Register of Historic Places. It was later demolished to construct the current Jacksonville Main Library.
