= Basilica of the Immaculate Conception (Jacksonville) =

Historic church in Florida, United States

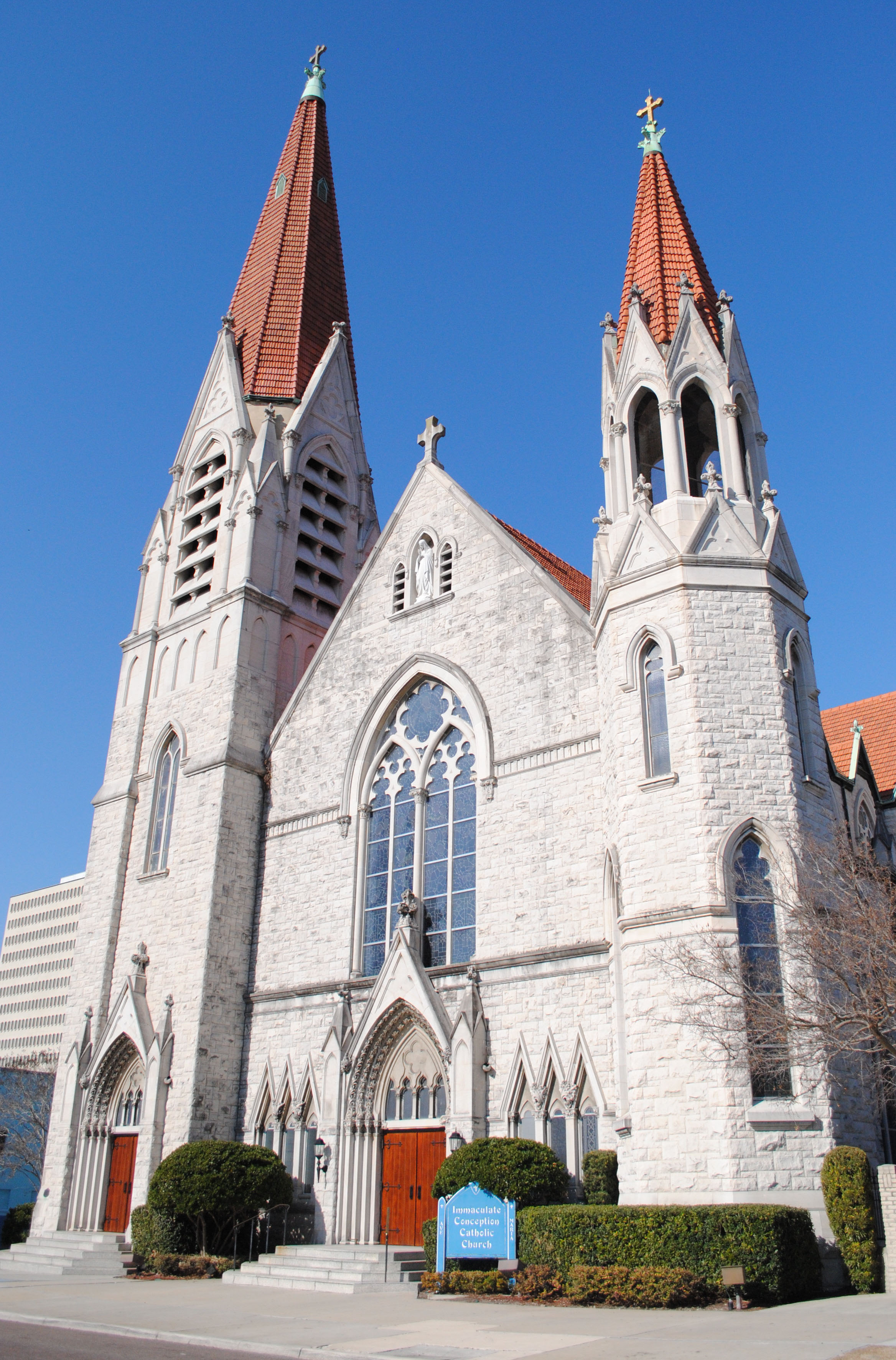
- Basilica of the Immaculate Conception
- Location: 121 E. Duval St. Jacksonville, Florida
- Country: United States
- Denomination: Catholic Church
- Website: www.icjax.org

History
- Status: Basilica/Parish
- Founded: 1845
- Dedication: Immaculate Conception
- Dedicated: December 8, 1910

Architecture
- Functional status: Active
- Architect: M. H. Hubbard
- Style: Gothic Revival
- Years built: 1907–1910

Administration
- Diocese: St. Augustine

Clergy
- Bishop: Most Rev. Erik T. Pohlmeier
- Pastor: Very Rev. Jan Ligeza (as of July 1, 2024)
- Church of the Immaculate Conception
- U.S. National Register of Historic Places
- Location within Florida Location within the United States
- Coordinates: 30°19′44″N 81°39′19″W
- Area: less than one acre
- Built by: Halsema-Woodcock Co.
- MPS: Downtown Jacksonville MPS
- NRHP reference No.: 92001695
- Added to NRHP: December 30, 1992

The Basilica of the Immaculate Conception is a historic Catholic church in Downtown Jacksonville, Florida, U.S. A parish church in the Diocese of St. Augustine, it represents Jacksonville's oldest Catholic congregation. The current building, dating to 1910, was added to the U.S. National Register of Historic Places in 1992 as the Church of the Immaculate Conception, and was named a minor basilica in 2013. It is located at 121 East Duval Street; its current pastor is Father Jan Ligeza.

== History ==
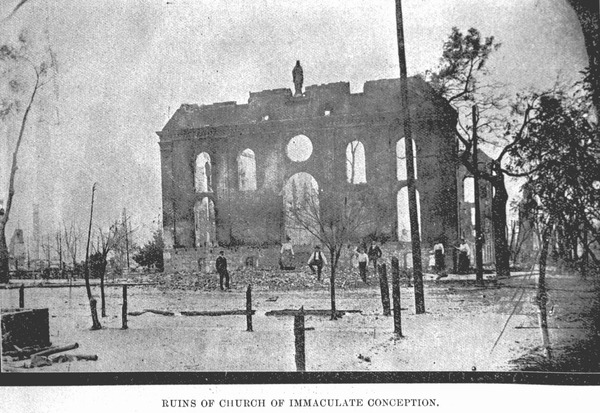
Ruins of the Church of the Immaculate Conception after the Great Fire of 1901

The congregation was established in about 1845 as a mission of the Catholic parish of Savannah in Georgia, and the first church building was constructed by 1847. Immaculate Conception was designated its own parish in 1854, but the original building was destroyed by Union forces during the American Civil War. A second building was planned shortly after Jacksonville became part of the newly created Catholic Diocese of St. Augustine in 1870, and was completed in 1874. This was destroyed along with most of downtown Jacksonville in the Great Fire of 1901.

The current building was designed in 1905 by architect M. H. Hubbard, also the designer of Bethel Baptist Institutional Church. Construction began in 1907 and completed on December 8, 1910, when the building was dedicated. The structure is an example of Late Gothic Revival architecture, considered one of the best such examples in Florida, featuring a cruciform floor plan, pointed arches, tracery on the windows, buttresses and pinnacles, high spires, and a high vault on the interior. The building's 178.5-foot (54.4 m) steeple, topped by a gold-plated cross, was the highest point in the city for three years until the Heard National Bank Building was finished in 1913.

In 1979, the church received solemn dedication, meaning the structure cannot be demolished willfully or converted to another purpose besides a church. On December 30, 1992, it was listed in the U.S. National Register of Historic Places. Beginning in 2005 the church sought designation as a minor basilica from the Congregation for Divine Worship and the Discipline of the Sacraments due to its history. The request was renewed in 2013 by Bishop Felipe de Jesús Estévez and granted; the designation was announced on August 15, 2013.
