= Young Men's Hebrew Association (Jacksonville) =

- U.S. National Register of Historic Places
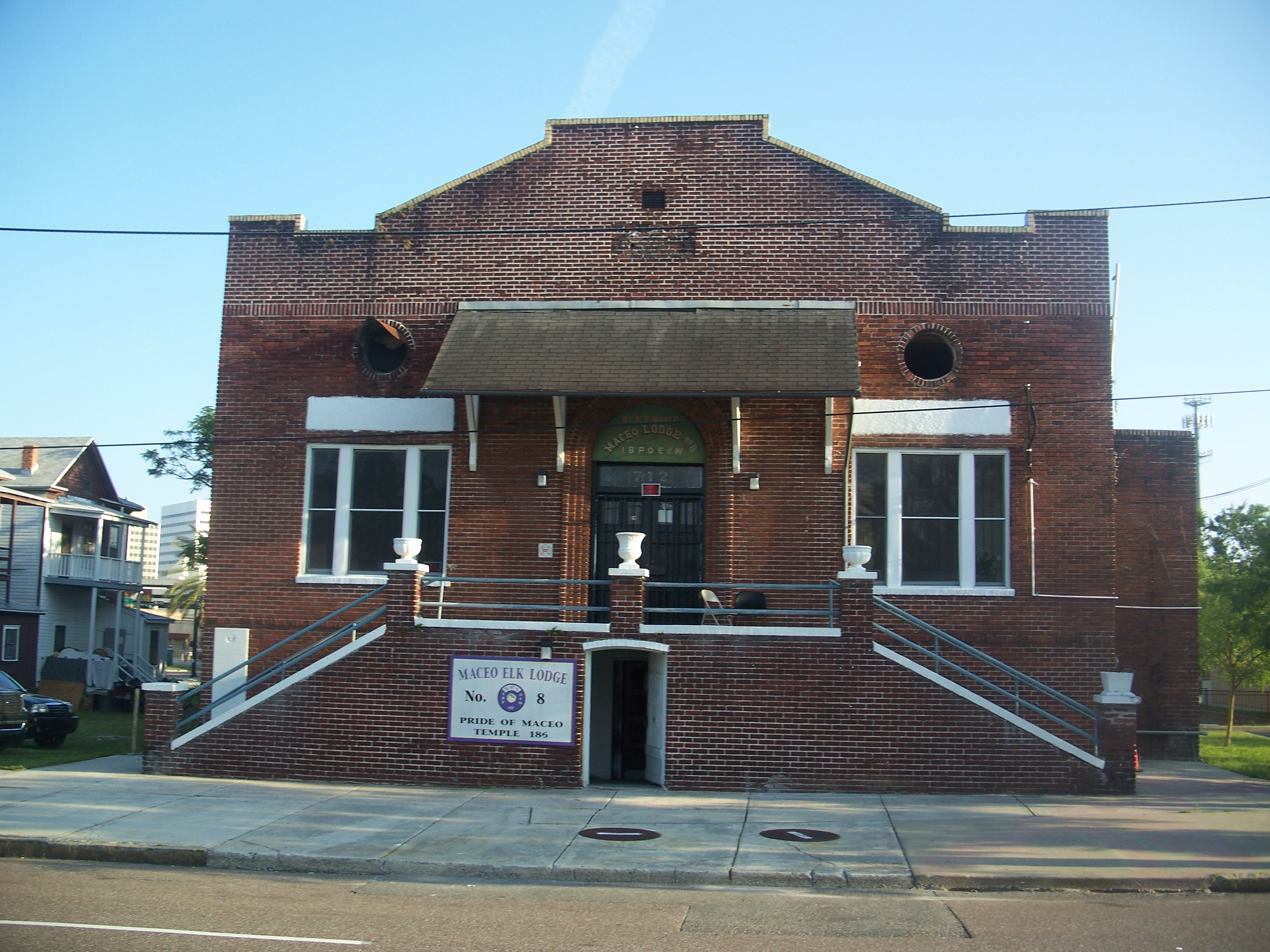

- Location within Florida Location within the United States
- Location: Jacksonville, Florida, USA
- Coordinates: 30°19′50″N 81°40′1″W
- NRHP reference No.: 92001486
- Added to NRHP: October 29, 1992

The Young Men's Hebrew Association (also known as the Maceo Elk Lodge #8) is a historic site in Jacksonville, Florida, United States. It is located at 712 West Duval Street. On October 29, 1992, it was added to the U.S. National Register of Historic Places.Young Men's Hebrew Association was an organization founded in Baltimore in 1854 to provide community services to Jewish neighborhoods.
