= Grand Site =

- U.S. National Register of Historic Places
- Location within Florida Location within the United States
- Location: Duval County, Florida
- Nearest city: Jacksonville
- Coordinates: 30°19′0″N 81°39′0″W
- Built: approx 500 AD
- NRHP reference No.: 75000551
- Added to NRHP: June 20, 1975

The Grand Site is an archaeological site in Jacksonville, Florida, United States. The site includes a shell midden about 30 feet wide and 175 feet in diameter, with a sand mound immediately to the west. It is a product of the St. Johns archaeological culture spanning the St. Johns IIA through IIB periods. On June 20, 1975, it was added to the U.S. National Register of Historic Places.
