= El Modelo Block =

- U.S. National Register of Historic Places
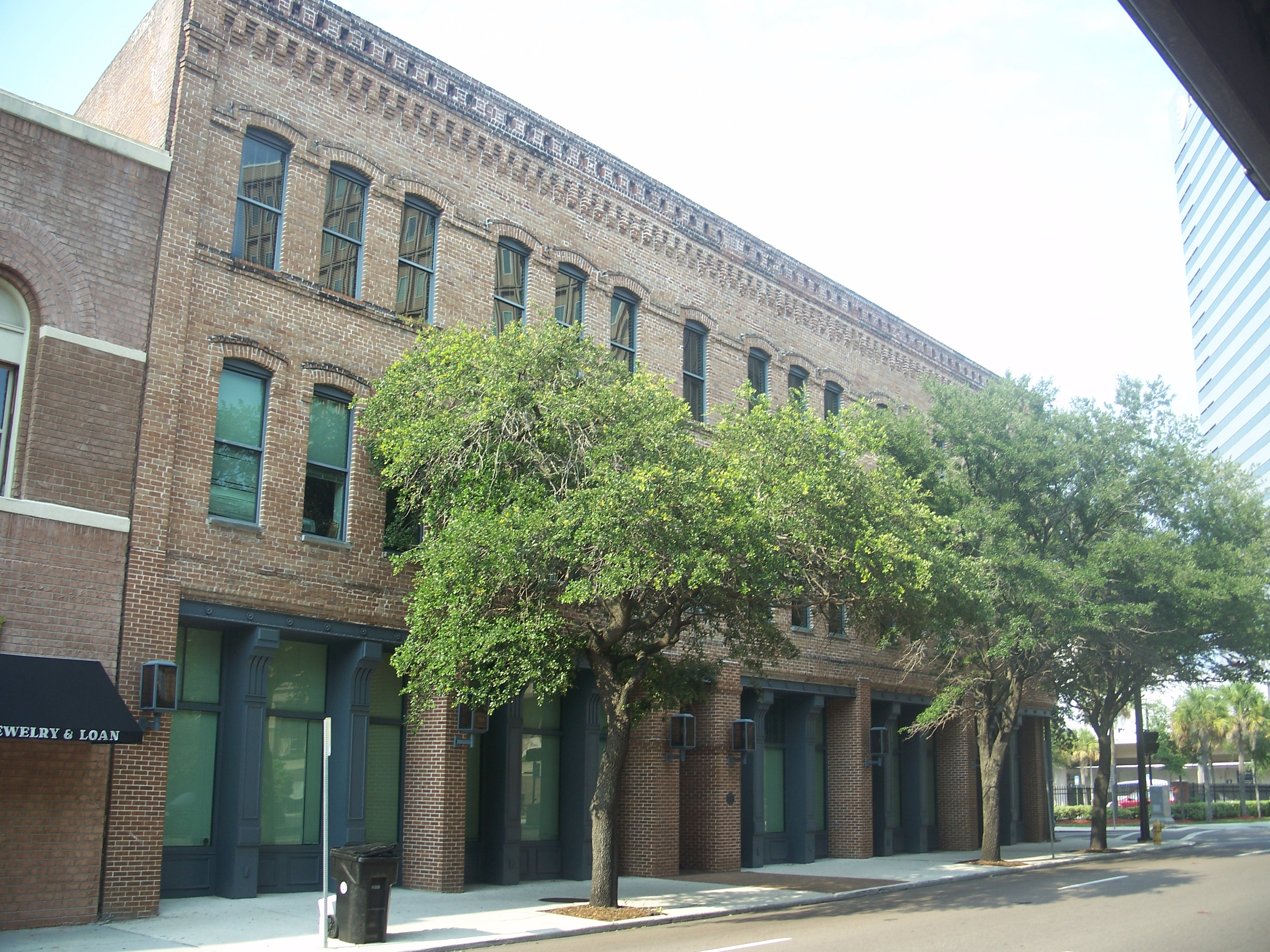

- Location within Florida Location within the United States
- Location: Jacksonville, Florida, USA
- Coordinates: 30°19′38″N 81°39′53″W
- Area: less than one acre
- NRHP reference No.: 80000948
- Added to NRHP: October 16, 1980

The El Modelo Block (also known as the Plaza Hotel) is a historic hotel in Jacksonville, Florida. It is located at 501-513 West Bay Street. On October 16, 1980, it was added to the U.S. National Register of Historic Places.
