= Title & Trust Company of Florida Building =

- U.S. National Register of Historic Places
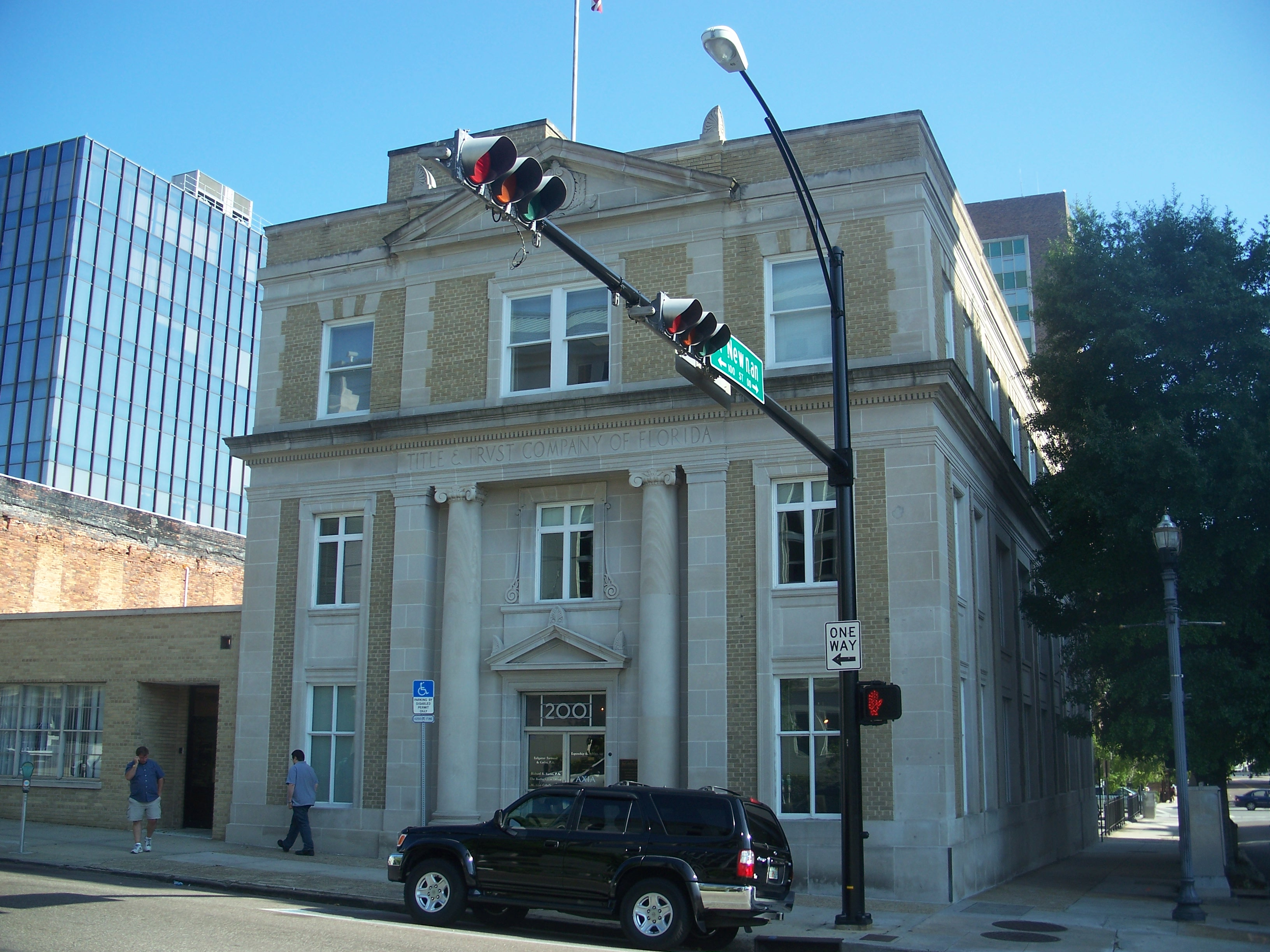

- Location within Florida Location within the United States
- Location: Jacksonville, Florida, USA
- Coordinates: 30°19′34″N 81°39′19″W
- Architectural style: Classical Revival
- NRHP reference No.: 90000312
- Added to NRHP: February 23, 1990

The Title & Trust Company of Florida Building is a historic site in Jacksonville, Florida. It is located at 200 East Forsyth Street. On February 23, 1990, it was added to the U.S. National Register of Historic Places.
