= Buckman and Ulmer Building =

- Formerly listed on the U.S. National Register of Historic Places
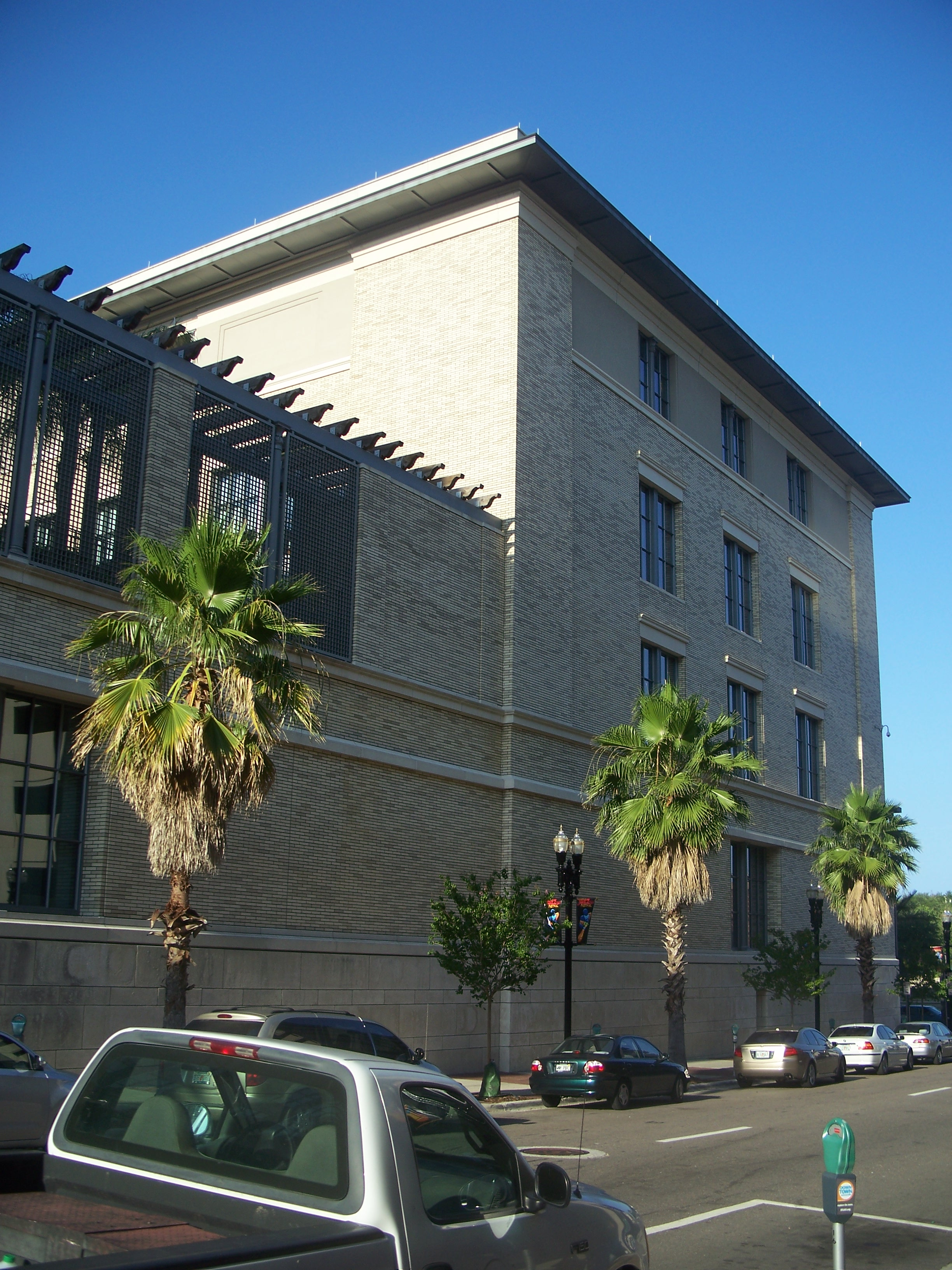
- Downtown library, built on site of demolished building

- Location within Florida Location within the United States
- Location: Jacksonville, Florida, USA
- Coordinates: 30°19′43″N 81°39′10″W
- Area: less than one acre
- Built: 1925
- Architect: Marsh & Saxelbye
- MPS: Downtown Jacksonville MPS
- NRHP reference No.: 92001694

Significant dates
- Added to NRHP: 30 December 1992
- Removed from NRHP: August 22, 2023

The Buckman and Ulmer Building was a historic building in Jacksonville, Florida. It was built in 1925 by Jacksonville architects Marsh & Saxelbye for the Buckman and Ulmer Real Estate Company. It was located at 29-33 West Monroe Street. On December 30, 1992, it was added to the U.S. National Register of Historic Places. It was later demolished to construct the current Jacksonville Main Library.
