= Epping Forest (Jacksonville) =

- U.S. National Register of Historic Places
- Mansion

- Location within Florida Location within the United States
- Location: Christopher Point, off San Jose Blvd., Jacksonville, Florida
- Coordinates: 30°14′54″N 81°38′26″W
- Built: 1927
- Architect: Harold Saxelbye
- Architectural style: Mission/Spanish Revival, Spanish-Mediterranean
- NRHP reference No.: 73000576
- Added to NRHP: May 9, 1973

The Epping Forest (also known as the Alfred I. duPont Estate) was a historic, 58-acre (230,000 m^{2}) estate in Jacksonville, Florida, United States where a luxurious riverfront mansion was built in the mid-1920s by industrialist Alfred I. du Pont and his third wife, Jessie Ball du Pont. It was added to the U.S. National Register of Historic Places in 1973 and has been restored to its original grandeur as the home of the Epping Forest Yacht Club. On April 18, 2012, the AIA's Florida Chapter placed the Epping Forest Yacht Club on its list of "Florida Architecture: 100 Years. 100 Places".

== duPont history ==
Alfred I. duPont was originally from Delaware and controlled the famous DuPont Chemical Company with his cousins, Pierre and Coleman. Over the years, their relationship deteriorated to the point where Alfred resigned from the family company in 1917. He created business ventures in Delaware and New York, but in 1925, cousin Pierre was named Delaware's tax commissioner. To distance Pierre from Alfred's property holdings and investments, Alfred decided to relocate to Jacksonville, Florida, a city he had often heard his mother talk about when he was growing up.

Alfred and Jessie became legal residents of Florida and Alfred began a second career pioneering the development of sound banking practices and investing in transportation and the paper industry.

In 1926, the Florida land boom of the 1920s had busted and land values were plummeting. Jacksonville's San Jose Estates Company, which had built the San Jose Hotel (now The Bolles School), sold the tract of land intended for the Vanderbilt hotel to Alfred duPont for his estate. That location was at Christopher Point, the widest spot on the St. Johns River, which provided an excellent area for his favorite pastime, yachting on his beloved 125 ft 5 in (38.2 m) Nenemoosha, built in 1922.

Local architects Marsh & Saxelbye designed the 15,000-square-foot (1,400 m^{2}), 25-room Epping Forest Mansion, but Harold Saxelbye contributed the most influence. It is primarily Mediterranean Revival, combining influences from Gothic, Spanish Renaissance and Baroque architectural. Jessie selected the furnishings; Alfred designed the formal English gardens and lion's head fountain. The estate was named in honor of Mary Ball Washington, George Washington's mother and Jessie's ancestor, whose Virginia plantation bore the same name. The duPonts estate hosted U.S. presidents, powerful men (Vanderbilt, Carnegie, etc.) and kings. After Jessie Ball duPont died in 1970, Edward Ball, who was Jessie's brother, sold the property to his close friend and local businessman Raymond K. Mason, CEO of the Charter Company, who used the property as his family residence until 1984.

== Epping Forest Yacht & Country Club ==
Yacht Club logo

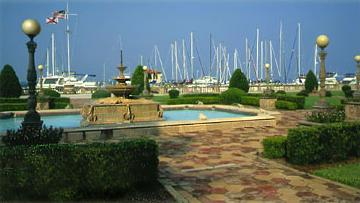
Yacht Club

In 1984, Gate Petroleum Company purchased the 58-acre (230,000 m^{2}) du Pont estate. The 11 1/3 acres (46,000 m^{2}) occupied by the mansion, gardens, boathouse and riverfront were restored to their original splendor and transformed into the Epping Forest Yacht & Country Club. The remaining property was developed into a gated community of ninety $1 million homes and 80 condominiums under the Epping Forest name. The last home was constructed in 1999.
