= San Jose Estates Thematic Resource Area =

- San Jose Thematic Group
- U.S. National Register of Historic Places
- Location within Florida Location within the United States
- Location: Jacksonville, Florida
- Coordinates: 30°14′44.93″N 81°37′44.39″W
- MPS: San Jose Thematic Group
- NRHP reference No.: 64000119

The following buildings in Jacksonville, Florida were added to the National Register of Historic Places as part of a Multiple Property Submission under the name San Jose Estates Thematic Resource Area (or TR).

Resource Name	Also known as	Address	City/County	Added
House at 3325 Via de la Reina	(also known as the Weida House)	3325 Via de la Reina	Jacksonville, Duval County	April 10, 1985
House at 3335 Via de la Reina	(also known as the Leake House)	3335 Via de la Reina	Jacksonville, Duval County	April 10, 1985
House at 3500 Via de la Reina	(also known as the Barbee House)	3500 Via de la Reina	Jacksonville, Duval County	April 10, 1985
House at 3609 Via de la Reina	(also known as the Cooper House)	3609 Via de la Reina	Jacksonville, Duval County	April 10, 1985
House at 3685 Via de la Reina	(also known as the Seaborne House)	3685 Via de la Reina	Jacksonville, Duval County	April 10, 1985
House at 3703 Via de la Reina	(also known as the Swicegood House)	3703 Via de la Reina	Jacksonville, Duval County	April 10, 1985
House at 3764 Ponce de Leon Avenue	(also known as the Barnes House)	3764 Ponce de Leon Avenue	Jacksonville, Duval County	April 10, 1985
House at 7144 Madrid Avenue	(also known as the Clements House)	7144 Madrid Avenue	Jacksonville, Duval County	April 10, 1985
House at 7207 Ventura Avenue	(also known as the Fountain House)	7207 Ventura Avenue	Jacksonville, Duval County	April 10, 1985
House at 7217 Ventura Avenue	(also known as the Rice House)	7217 Ventura Avenue	Jacksonville, Duval County	April 10, 1985
House at 7227 San Pedro	(also known as the Fischer House)	7227 San Pedro Road	Jacksonville, Duval County	April 10, 1985
House at 7245 San Jose Boulevard	(also known as the Lane House)	7245 San Jose Boulevard	Jacksonville, Duval County	April 10, 1985
House at 7246 San Carlos	(also known as the Steele House)	7246 San Carlos	Jacksonville, Duval County	April 10, 1985
House at 7246 St. Augustine Road	(also known as the Truman House)	7246 St. Augustine Road	Jacksonville, Duval County	April 10, 1985
House at 7249 San Pedro	(also known as the Richardson House)	7249 San Pedro Road	Jacksonville, Duval County	April 10, 1985
House at 7288 San Jose Boulevard	(also known as the Matheney House)	7288 San Jose Boulevard	Jacksonville, Duval County	April 10, 1985
House at 7306 St. Augustine Road	(also known as the Roberts House)	7306 St. Augustine Road	Jacksonville, Duval County	April 10, 1985
House at 7317 San Jose Boulevard	(also known as the Givens House)	7317 San Jose Boulevard	Jacksonville, Duval County	April 10, 1985
House at 7330 Ventura Avenue	(also known as the Provinsky House)	7330 Ventura Avenue	Jacksonville, Duval County	April 10, 1985
House at 7356 San Jose Boulevard	(also known as the Fulton House)	7356 San Jose Boulevard	Jacksonville, Duval County	April 10, 1985
House at 7400 San Jose Boulevard	(also known as the Bolles House)	7400 San Jose Boulevard	Jacksonville, Duval County	April 10, 1985
San Jose Administration Building	(also known as the San Jose Episcopal Church)	7423 San Jose Boulevard	Jacksonville, Duval County	April 10, 1985
San Jose Country Club	formerly the San Jose Hotel Golf Club	7529 San Jose Boulevard	Jacksonville, Duval County	April 10, 1985
San Jose Hotel	(also known as The Bolles School)	7400 San Jose Boulevard	Jacksonville, Duval County	April 10, 1985
San Jose Estates Gatehouse		1873 Christopher Point Road, North	Jacksonville, Duval County	December 20, 1988
