= San Jose Episcopal Church =

Historic church in Florida, United States

- San Jose Administration Building
- U.S. National Register of Historic Places
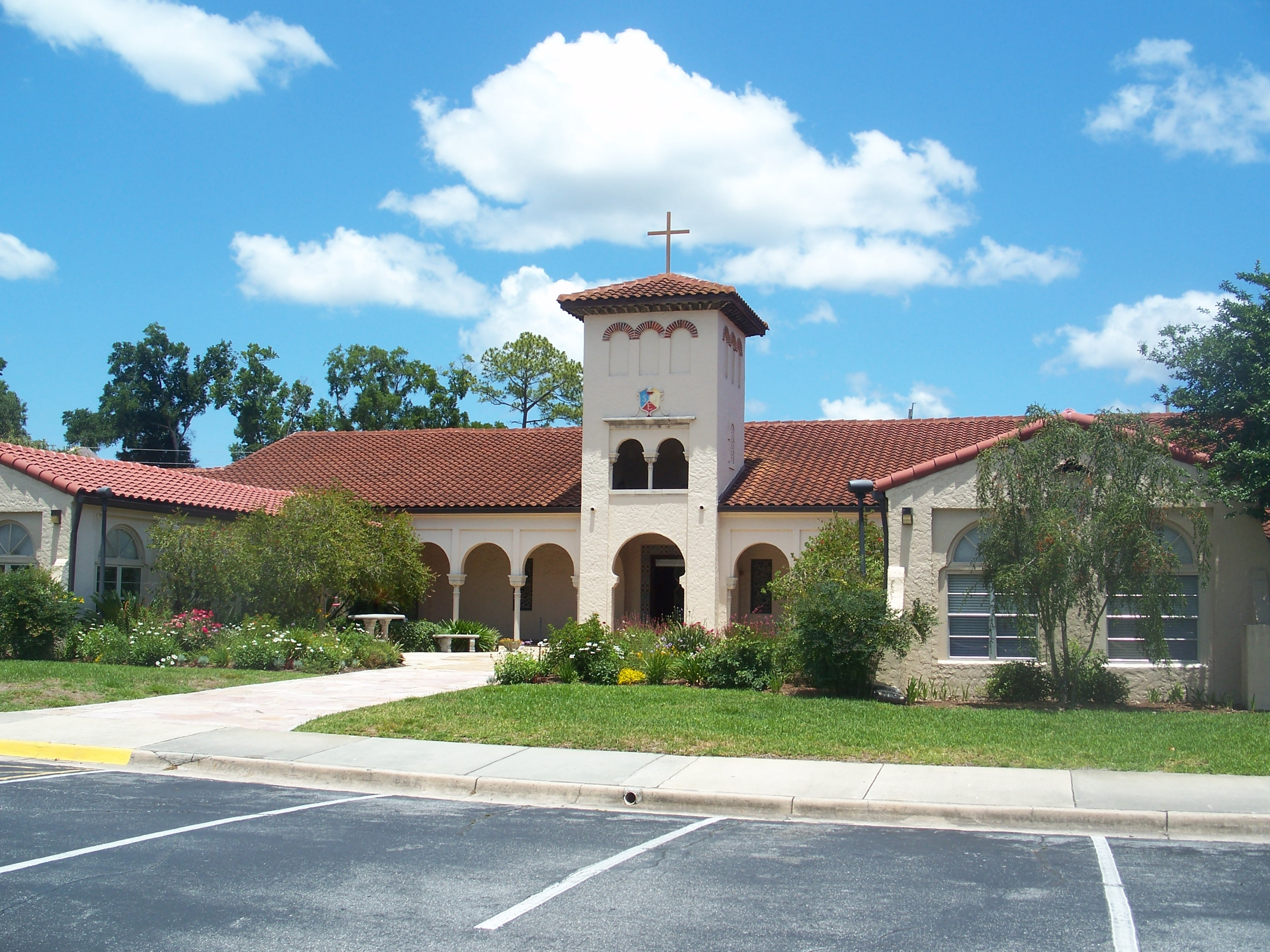

- Location within Florida Location within the United States
- Location: 7423 San Jose Boulevard; Jacksonville, Florida
- Coordinates: 30°14′37″N 81°37′35″W
- Area: less than one acre
- Built: 1925
- Architect: Marsh and Saxelbye, architects; O.P. Woodcock, builder
- Architectural style: Mediterranean Revival
- MPS: San Jose Estates TR
- NRHP reference No.: 85000760
- Added to NRHP: April 10, 1985

San Jose Episcopal Church is an historic Episcopal church located at 7423 San Jose Boulevard, in the San Jose section of Jacksonville, Florida in the United States. It was built in 1925 as the San Jose Estates Administration Building. On April 10, 1985. it was added to the National Register of Historic Places as the San Jose Administration Building.

== History ==
The San Jose Estates Administration Building was built in 1925 by the developers of San Jose Estates. After the real estate boom collapsed, Alfred I. duPont acquired the property. Upon his death in 1935, the property passed to his widow, Jesse Ball duPont. In 1941 Mrs. duPont agreed to let it be used for Episcopal worship services and it became known as Grace Chapel. The cadets from the Bolles Military Academy located across the street used it as their chapel also and attended Sunday worship services as a body. In 1949 Mrs. duPont gave the property to the Episcopal Diocese of Florida for the founding of a new congregation, and in 1951, Grace Chapel (as it was first known) became an Episcopal Parish, with The Reverend Grover Alison as its founding priest. Alison was also serving as the priest at Church Of Our Savior in Mandarin at the same time. In 1952 he left Mandarin and moved to San Jose. In 1971, Grace Chapel Parish became San Jose Episcopal Church as the term "Chapel" no longer accurately described the broad mission of the church.

The Day School began as a mission of the church with a kindergarten program and was established to provide excellent academics in a Christian environment. This tradition continues today and the school has expanded and grown to now serve students in grades Pre-K 3 through sixth grade.

It was listed on the National Register of Historic Places in 1985.

== Current use ==
San Jose Episcopal Church is still a functioning parish in the Episcopal Diocese of Florida. Its current rector is the Rev. Stephen Courtney Britt.

== See also ==
- San Jose Estates Thematic Resource Area
