= FIVE (music venue) =

Theatre in Jacksonville, Florida

Coordinates: 30°18′52″N 81°40′50″W

- Riverside Theater (1927-1982); River City Playhouse (1984-1991); Club 5 Nightclub (1991-2004); 5 Points Theatre (2008-2011); Sun-Ray Cinema (2011-2024); FIVE (May 2025-present)
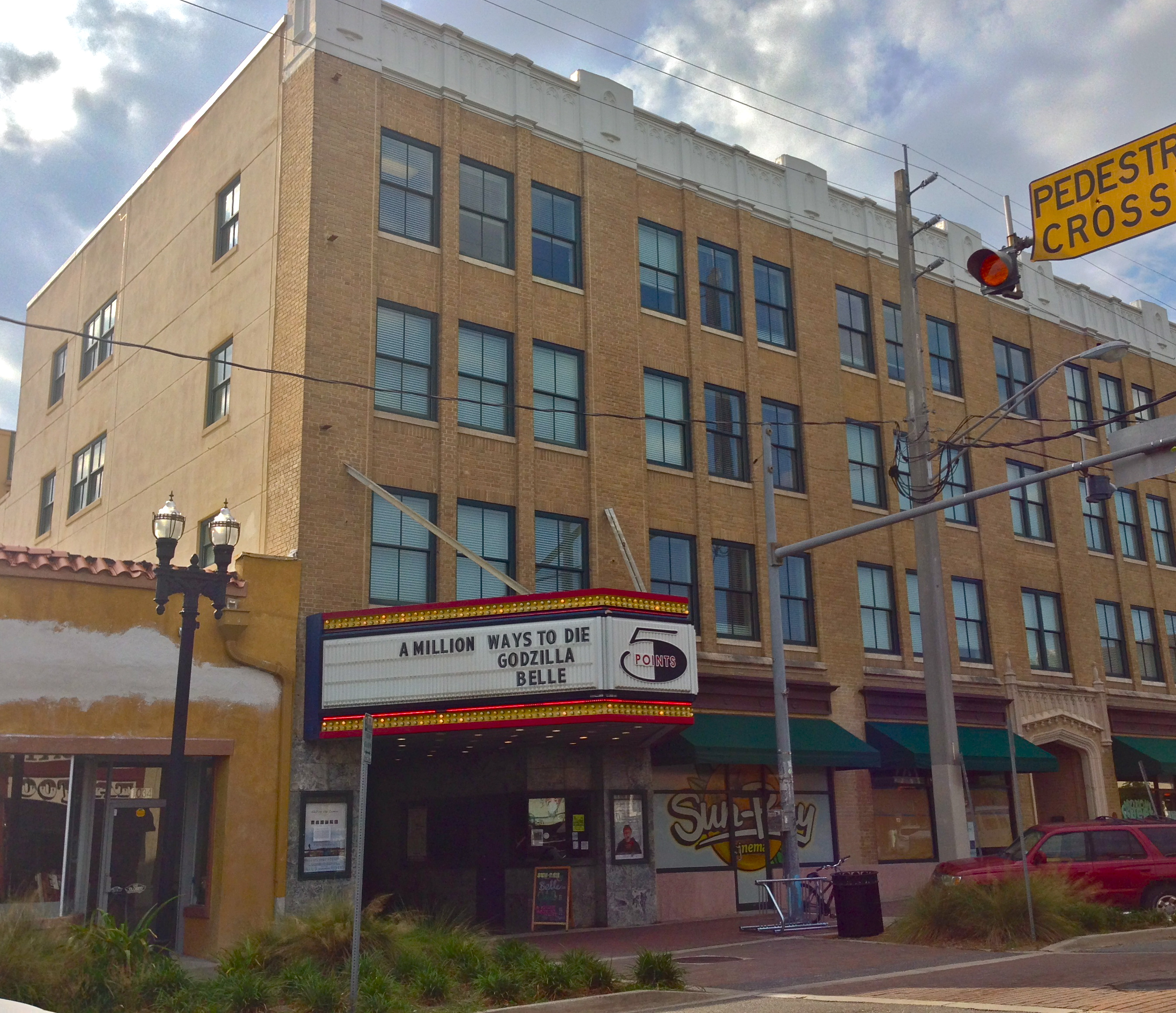

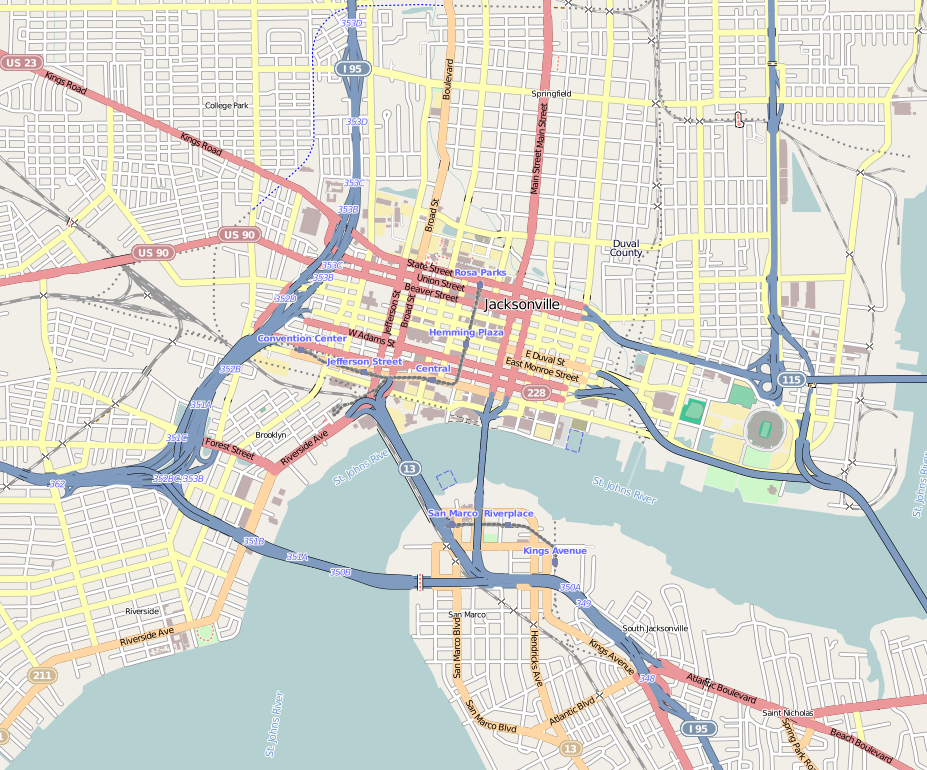
- Location within Central Jacksonville Location within Florida
- Address: 1028 Park Street; Jacksonville, Florida; United States
- Owner: Union South Partners
- Capacity: 200
- Current use: Movie theater

Construction
- Opened: March 1, 1927; 99 years ago
- Rebuilt: 2004-2008 historic restoration
- Architect: Roy Benjamin

Website
- FIVE

The Five Points Theatre, formerly known as Sun-Ray Cinema, Riverside Theater and 5 Points Theatre, is a historic two-screen movie theater in Jacksonville, Florida. The first theater in Florida equipped to show talking pictures, it opened in March 1927 in the Five Points district of the Riverside and Avondale neighborhood. In June 2025 the theatre will be reopened as a music venue called FIVE.

== History ==
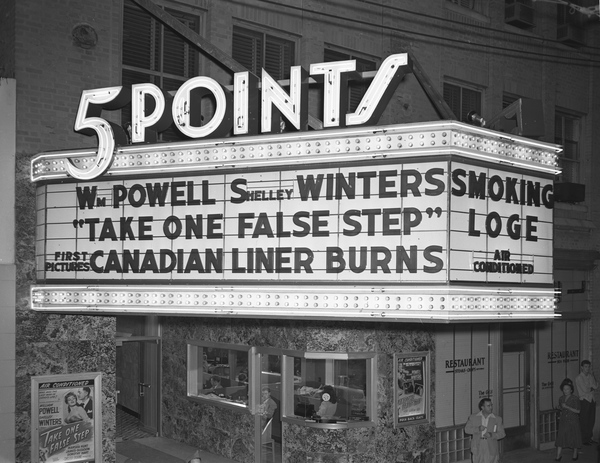
Five Points Theatre in 1949.

The Riverside Theater opened in March 1927, when the Five Points area was emerging as a commercial center for Riverside and Avondale. It was the first in the state, and third in the country, equipped to show talking pictures. The architect was Roy Benjamin, whose architectural firm eventually became KBJ Architects. The theater is part of a much larger Italian Renaissance revival building. Benjamin went on to design more than 200 theaters throughout Florida and the southeastern United States, including Downtown Jacksonville's Florida Theatre. The first "talkie" shown in the theater was Don Juan, starring John Barrymore and Mary Astor. Admission was $1.10, an expensive ticket considering the prevailing wage was less than a quarter per hour.

The building was remodeled in 1949 and renamed the Five Points Theater when the marquee was added, which remains to this day. In 1977 the theater closed for several years and an attempt was made to "modernize" the building in 1978 with the application of stucco. In the early 1980s the movie theater shut down, and the acting group River City Playhouse moved into the space in 1984. In 1991 the building was remodeled into a nightclub, Club 5, which closed in 2004.

A four-year, $4.5 million historic restoration was begun in 2004 after local car dealer Mike Shad purchased the property. Midway through the renovations, the facility was opened for private events like reunions and wedding receptions, but work was not completed until 2008. The renamed 5 Points Theatre and Historic Event Facility now offers 14 loft condominiums on the third and fourth floors, commercial/office space on the second level and retail space on the ground floor, in addition to the theater. Although the marquee was not original, it was also restored because it is considered a historic component. In 2010 the Theatre shifted to an "art house" format, with foreign, independent and classic films, late night movies, and special events and concerts. The Theatre was a venue for the 2009 and 2010 Jacksonville Film Festivals, the 2009 and 2010 Citrus Cel Animation Festival, and has hosted its own Horror Film Festival as well. In 2014, it served as screening home for the Jacksonville edition of the 48 Hour Film Project.

== Present day ==
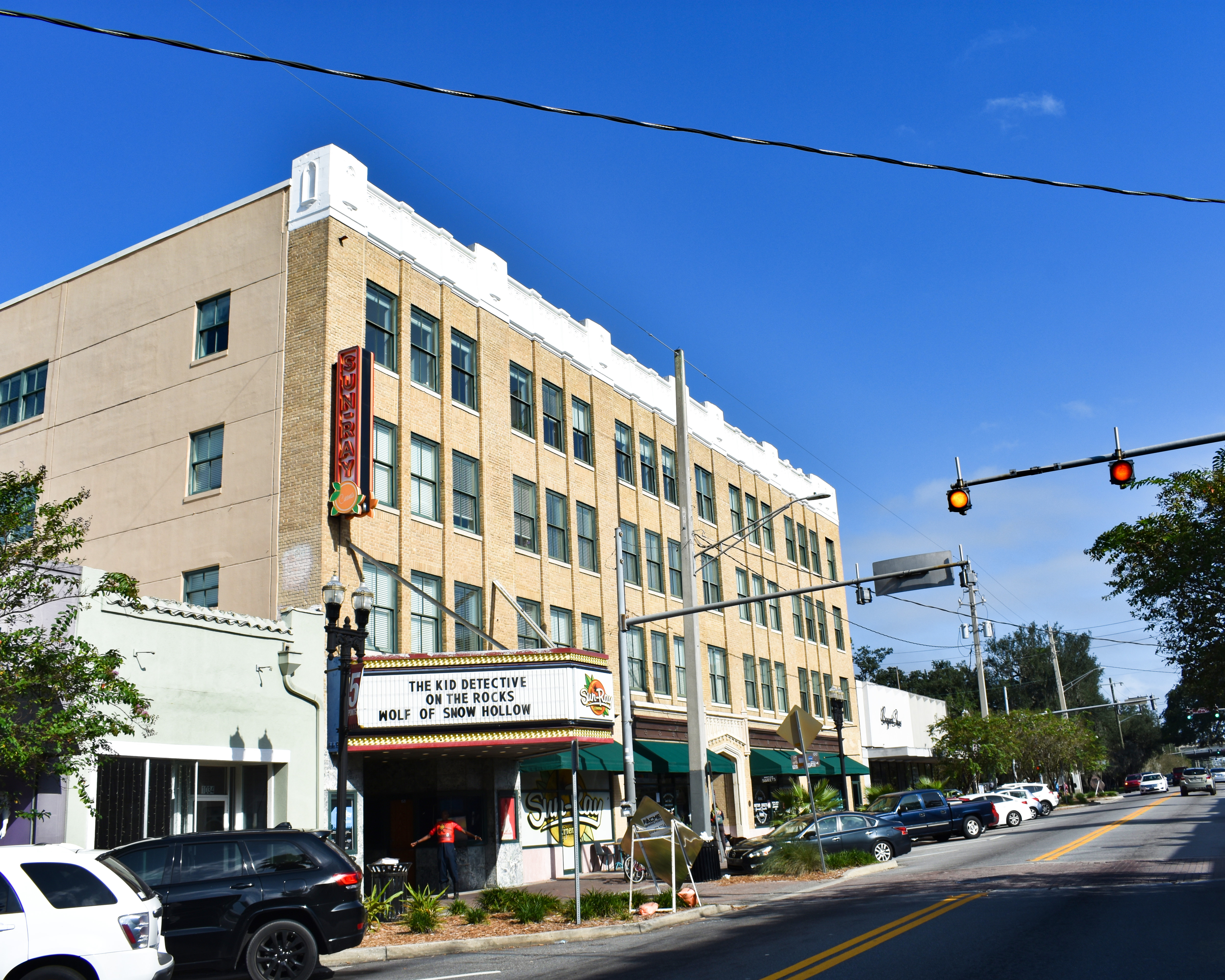
Sun-Ray Cinema in 2020.

During 2011, co-owners Tim Massett and his wife Shana David-Massett raised funds to take over and refresh the venue. Massett, a Jacksonville native who managed a movie theater in Minnesota, raised $102,450 via online crowdsourcing and private loans. Their improvements include a larger screen, sound dampening, and tiered theater seats. The venue was renamed the Sun-Ray Cinema at 5 Points, and re-opened in December 2011. The show schedule features new releases, lesser-known movies and cult films. In addition to traditional movie fare plus beer and wine, they also serve sandwiches, hummus, site-made pizza with unusual toppings (such as kimchi, sauerkraut and sriracha sauce) and baked goods. The theatre expanded its capacity, adding a second auditorium in 2014.

In 2016, PETA ranked Sun-Ray Cinema as the number one theater for people who do not eat animal products, since the menu includes multiple vegan, vegetarian and gluten-free options.

In 2024 the building was sold to Atlanta developer Southbank Partners for $7 million, and the lease was not renewed for the existing cinema operators. Local leaders said they hoped to “improve it as a destination for entertainment while preserving the theater’s historic feel.”

In May 2025 the venue reopened as a mid-size music hall under the name FIVE. Marathon Live, a Nashville-based facility-management company, renovated the building, preserving the historic façade and many original interior elements while adding modern sound and lighting, an expanded balcony, upgraded restrooms and a VIP loft in the former projection booth. Five has a standing capacity of about 1,250 and launched with a concert by BoyWithUke on 13 May 2025; early performers included Kameron Marlowe, Turnover, Aly & AJ, Bowling for Soup, Descendents and Alkaline Trio.
