= Jacksonville Film Festival =

Annual film festival held in Florida, United States

Coordinates: 30.1814°N 81.3915°W

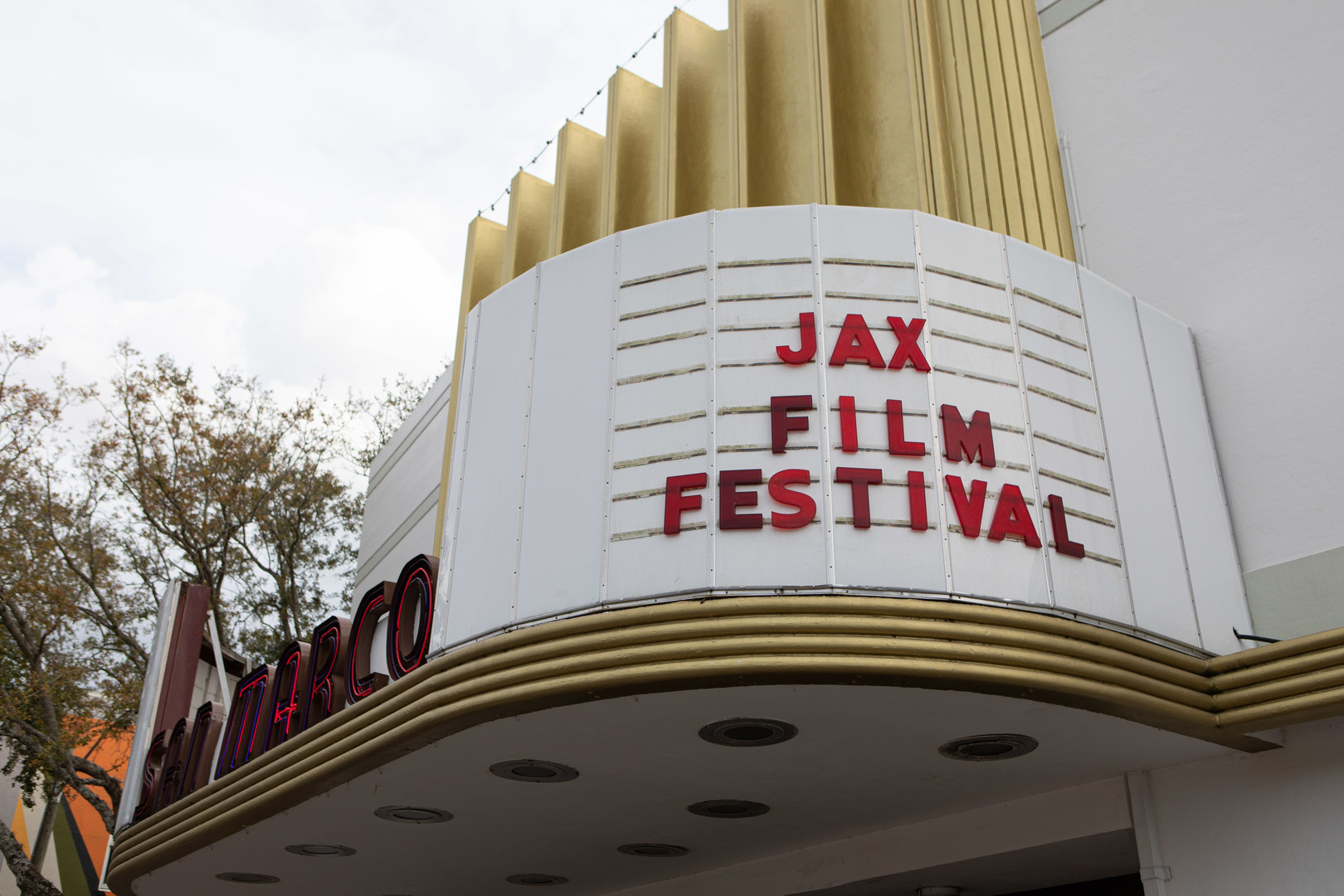
- Location: Jacksonville, Florida, United States
- Founded: 2002; 24 years ago
- Most recent: April 12-14, 2024
- Awards: Best of Fest
- Language: International
- Website: jacksonvillefilmfestival.com

The Jacksonville Film Festival is an annual film festival held in Jacksonville, Florida. Founded in 2002, the festival screens in competition and out-of-competition American and international independent films. According to the Daily Record, the festival is "an anticipated event among the international independent film community and an economic development driver for North Florida."

== History ==
The Inaugural Jacksonville Film Festival debuted May 15–18, 2003 with the opening film The Flying Ace, made by Norman Studios in Jacksonville, Florida in 1926. In addition to screening films, the festival hosts panels, workshops and parties. Jacksonville Film Festival was conceived by Joan Monsky and Karen Sadler in the spring of 2002. They assembled a small advisory group of community leaders and arts advocates to create a mission and a template for the event which was ambitiously scheduled for May 2003. In that year Jacksonville Film Festival became a non-profit organization.

The Robin Shepherd Group designed the turtle logo and creative graphics, the city and the Times-Union declared their support, Preston Haskell contributed wisdom and encouragement (and more), and Erik Hart offered space and services at the Florida Theatre. Sponsors also took a leap of faith, and volunteers were generous with hours and hours of time and effort. Joan Monsky was elected president and brought in programmers to help guide the artistic vision. After long, arduous planning sessions, the First Annual Jacksonville Film Festival made its successful debut.

In 2003, The mission of the Festival was threefold: to connect Jacksonville to its early "Hollywood of the South" moviemaking roots, to focus attention on independent film and filmmakers, and to contribute to the revitalization of downtown Jacksonville. Six downtown venues hosted films, parties and special events including the popular Entertainment Law Panel and Viva Cinema. Downtown was also alive with movie buffs, movie stars and movie guests.

A year later in 2004, Bill Murray received the honor of the Tortuga Verde Award for Lifetime Achievement. The screening of Napoleon Dynamite got world-wide press for the seasons biggest hit film and Director Christopher Coppola screened his latest film "The Creature of Sunnyside Trailer Park" at the historic Florida Theater.

In 2005, The festival added new initiatives: Books Alive!, a monthly program in partnership with the Jacksonville Public Library, celebrating family films derived from literature and REEL People, the film festival "fan club" offering year-round screenings of diverse and unique films never before seen in Jacksonville.

In 2006, John Travolta's film Lonely Hearts was the headline film in the 2006 Jacksonville Film Festival.

In 2007, the Jacksonville Film Festival celebrated its fifth year. The festival has been embraced by the city and is gaining increasing recognition in the Southeast as an important destination for the independent film community. A key to the success has been the festival commitment to offering "Something for Everyone!"

2008 will be known as the year of significant change. Jesse Rodriguez took the helm as Executive and program director, and along with the board of directors, extended the festival to a full week incorporating programs such as A TASTE OF ASIA, EUROPA EUROPA, HIP HOP FOR THE MASSES, as well as A MOMENT OF SILENCE PLEASE, a film program for the Deaf. The concept for a FILM FESTIVAL VILLAGE was also realized making all the venues and hotel within walking distance of each other. Now as an international film festival, over 20 countries were represented through cinema in 2008.

In 2018, the Jacksonville Film Festival was revived in September after a six-year hiatus under the leadership of Niki Logoreci, who has served as executive director ever since. Initially hosted at the historic San Marco Theatre, the festival adapted after the venue's permanent closure in by shifting screenings downtown, where venues are now within walking distance. The festival has since grown significantly, with sold-out screenings, new categories including All of the Colors (LGBTQ+-focused), Utterly Macabre (horror/macabre), and faith-based films, and strong emphasis on inclusivity for women and local filmmakers. Highlights include record-breaking 2019 submissions (471 films from 41 countries, 101 selected) with 26 percent of the accepted films were directed by women. Programming success is driven by Tim Driscoll, Program Director since the revival, who curates diverse lineups attracting international and high-profile talent, supported by Brian Reese and Monica Whitsel. Key initiatives launched under this leadership include: the #filminjax campaign (2018) celebrating Jacksonville’s history as the "Winter Film Capital of the World"; the Women's Perspective program (2019) with panels, guest speakers, and networking for women filmmakers; and Jax City Limits (2020), screening local works post-festival.

Notable award winners include Harry Holland, who received the 2024 Special Jury Award for Direction for his short film Last Call and attended in person; Sarah Holland's Egghead & Twinkie, Best Feature Narrative winner in 2024—a Florida-made LGBTQ+ comedy that later achieved wide streaming success; and the Emmy-nominated documentary Join or Die (directed by Rebecca and Pete Davis, featuring Hillary Clinton, Pete Buttigieg, and Vivek Murthy), which won Best Feature Documentary in its screening year for its examination of America's civic decline based on Robert Putnam's "Bowling Alone," earning further acclaim at other festivals and community tours. The event continues to host panels, workshops, and networking, strengthening Jacksonville's indie film scene and cinematic legacy. The festival has also hosted special screenings, including the documentary Beyond Triathlon on October 12, 2024, featuring 90-year-old Jacksonville triathlon pioneer Dottie Dorion and celebrating women in master sports, which raised money for UNF scholarships.
