= Bernard W. Close =

American architect

Bernard W. Close (1889–1972) was an architect in Jacksonville, Florida. He designed many residences in the Riverside and Avondale neighborhoods.

Close graduated from Cornell University and worked in New York before coming to Jacksonville in 1925 during the Florida Land Boom. He worked for Roy A. Benjamin before establishing his own practice and was president of the Florida Association of Architects from 1930 to 1931.

== Works ==
- Leo Hughes Residence at 1854 Montgomery Place
- Richard Forester Residence at 1886 Montgomery Place
- Willow Branch Library at 2875 Park Street
- 4321 Kelnepa Drive in South Jacksonville
- 4346 Kelnepa Drive in South Jacksonville
- 4424 Kelnepa Drive in South Jacksonville
- San Marco Branch Library
- 1961 River Boulevard in San Marco
- 2400 Seminole Road in Atlantic Beach
