= Ortega (Jacksonville) =

Neighborhood of Jacksonville, Florida

- Old Ortega Historic District
- U.S. National Register of Historic Places
- U.S. Historic district
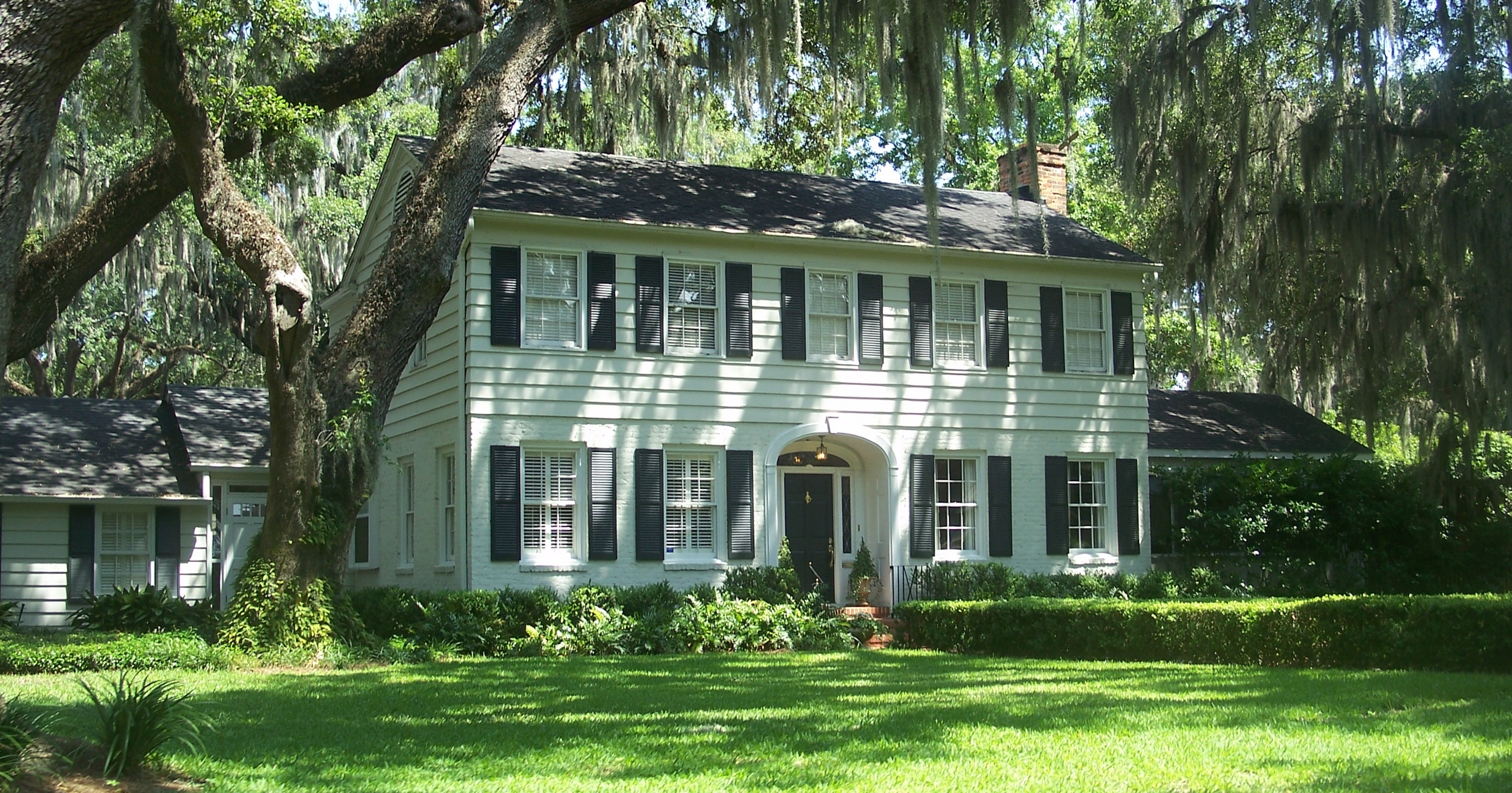

- Location within Florida Location within the United States
- Location: Jacksonville, Florida, US
- Coordinates: 30°16′15.5″N 81°42′19.5″W
- Area: 4,500 acres (1,800 ha)
- NRHP reference No.: 04000682
- Added to NRHP: July 14, 2004

Ortega is a neighborhood of Jacksonville, Florida, US. It is located south of downtown Jacksonville on a peninsula off the western bank of the St. Johns River. It is one of the wealthiest neighborhoods in Jacksonville, and is the location of many historic homes and buildings.

The peninsula containing Ortega is bounded by the St. Johns and Ortega Rivers, and is bisected by Roosevelt Boulevard (U.S. Route 17); the area to the east of Roosevelt is known as Old Ortega, while the area to the west is known as Ortega Forest. On July 14, 2004, a section of Ortega to the east of 17 and north of Verona Boulevard was designated as the Old Ortega Historic District by the National Register of Historic Places.

== History ==
Ortega got its start in 1763, shortly after Spain ceded Florida to England. By 1780, Colonel Daniel McGirtt moved into the Jones Plantation and served with rebel troops in Georgia against the British. After some skirmishes, he later changed sides and joined the British, plundering the rebel troops and stealing Georgian cattle. Soon he formed a band of outlaws and terrorized the British, as well. The British governor, eventually had him court martialed and jailed at Castillo de San Marcos in Saint Augustine, but he escaped. There are a road and a park in the neighborhood still named after him to this day.

In 1902, J. Pierpont Morgan helped a local Florida senator finance what is modern day Ortega. By 1908, the Ortega Company had completed a wooden bridge across the Ortega River, connecting to Avondale. A clubhouse was built and was designed by famed architect Henry Bacon of Lincoln Memorial. Bacon also built a house in the neighborhood, of which neither the original clubhouse nor his house remain. The final construction boom occurred during the 1920s and Ortega has remained a neighborhood filled with wealthy businessmen and old families.

== Geography ==
The peninsula containing the Ortega neighborhood was originally an island until a land bridge was constructed at the southern end; this is now part of Roosevelt Boulevard, a section of U.S. Route 17. The peninsula is separated from the mainland by the St. Johns River to the east, and the smaller waterway known as the Ortega River to the north and west. Ortega is bisected by Roosevelt; the older area to the east of the road is known as "Ortega" or "Old Ortega", while the newer developments to the west comprise "Ortega Forest". Ortega is also accessible via a two-lane bascule bridge, the Ortega River Bridge, which carries Ortega Boulevard (State Road 211). The current bridge was constructed in 1927.

On July 14, 2004, a section of Old Ortega was designated the Old Ortega Historic District by the National Register of Historic Places. The district is located east of U.S. 17 and north of Verona Boulevard. Ortega Boulevard is the primary route throughout the district, which covers 4500 acres and contains 597 historic buildings.

== Neighborhood ==
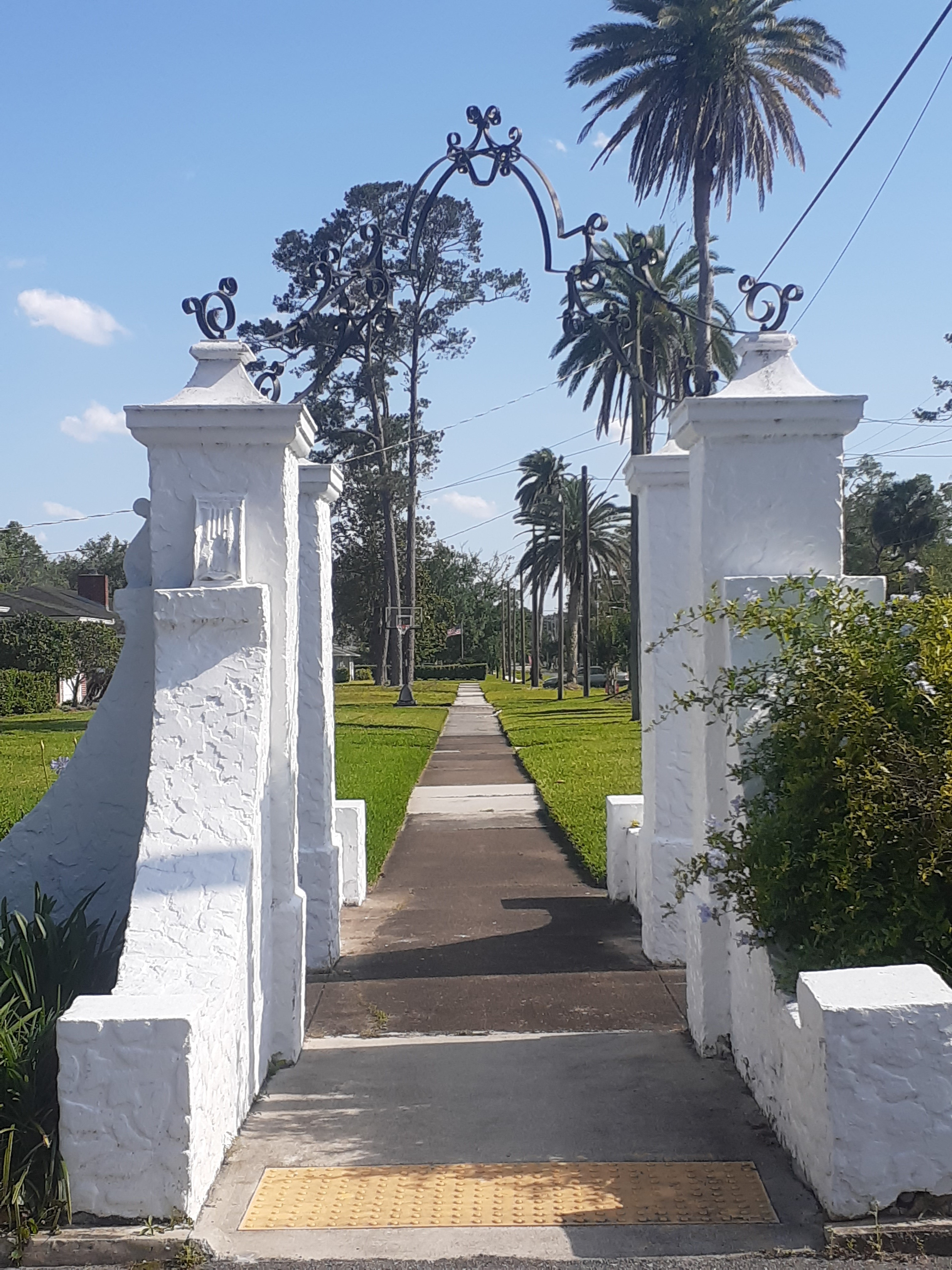
Gates at Yacht Club Road and Ortega Boulevard for the 1920s Venetia development in Ortega

Ortega has a few different sections with different characteristics. There is the riverfront, with multimillion-dollar mansions. Ortega Point has old wood frame and Tudor homes surrounding Bettes Park. The historic district has modest wood-frame homes dating back to the early 1900s. Ortega Terrace towards the southern interior of the peninsula has large, stone and brick houses with a mix of styles. There is an extensive park system and many of the local residents set up trusts to help maintain and landscape the parks.

The Venetia gates mark the entrance to Venetia, a development founded in 1925 by Col. Raymond C. Turck on 500 acres of land in the Ortega neighborhood. Designed by architect Mellon Greely, the development was planned to be a Mediterranean-inspired community with a railroad station, a resort hotel, a yacht basin, and canals like those of Venice, Italy. Turck's project was never realized because of the collapse of the Florida real estate boom in 1926. According to a long-time resident, a man who had lived there since the 1930s, there were only 32 houses in the area then and no street markers, and Ortega Boulevard was a brick road that ran all the way to Green Cove Springs. The gates had an electric light suspended from the center of the ornamental iron work (restored) that stretches from pillar to pillar.

Two schools serve Ortega: Ortega Elementary School and St. Mark's Episcopal Day School; many children also attend Stockton Elementary School in nearby Ortega Forest. Many of the neighborhood children walk or ride bikes to school and the neighborhood is characterized by a very strong family-oriented environment. Many of the neighborhood teenagers attend local or northern private schools or the International Baccalaureate at one of two "magnet" high schools nearby.

The street system is a grid pattern with themed street names. One end of the historic district has street names characterized by large Native American tribes. One section has the names of Ivy League schools. Another section has the names of all the styles of columns (i.e. Doric, Ionic, Corinthian).

The largest churches in the area are St. Mark's Episcopal Church and United Methodist Church.

Residents are often members of either the Florida Yacht Club or Timuquana Country Club. Due to the easy access to the water many residents enjoy boating or sailing. Prominent New York businessman William Astor helped start the Florida Yacht Club and was an active member there (there is still a room in the present 1928 clubhouse named for him). Timuquana's greens were designed by the country's most prominent golf architect, Donald Ross and later upgraded and maintained by Robert Trent Jones.

Huckins Yachts are also constructed across the Ortega River from the neighborhood. Started over 80 years ago, the very first Huckins was sold to David M. Goodrich of B.F. Goodrich Rubber Company. He later purchased two more yachts. Many residents of the neighborhood own a Huckins Yacht, ranging in size from 35 feet to almost 100 feet. Huckins are also popular in yachting circles in Fort Lauderdale, Florida and Newport, Rhode Island. Huckins also built many PT boats for the U.S. Navy in World War II.

== Notable past and present residents ==
- Henry Bacon, architect of the Lincoln Memorial
- Jack del Rio, coach of the Jacksonville Jaguars
- David Duval, professional golfer
- John Milton Bryan Simpson, former federal judge for which the John Milton Bryan Simpson United States Courthouse is named
- Bill Terry, former Major League baseball player and member of the Baseball Hall of Fame

== Gallery ==
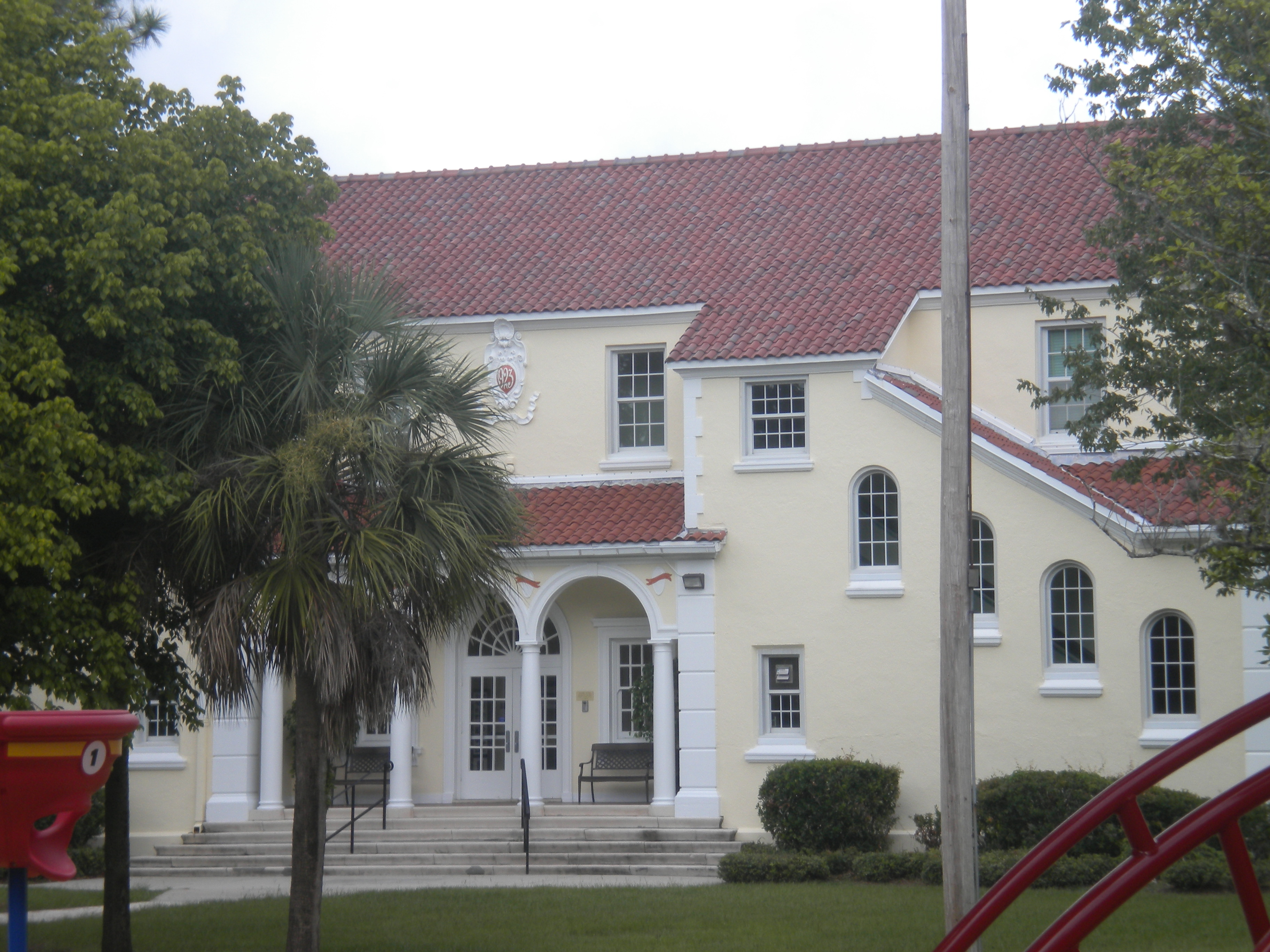
Front View of Ortega Elementary.

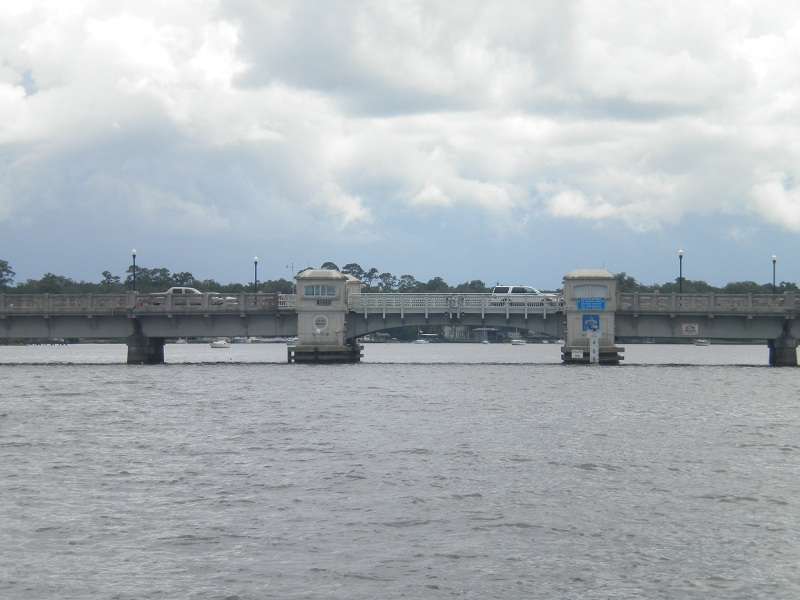
View of the 1928 Ortega Drawbridge, one of the busiest drawbridges left in the country.

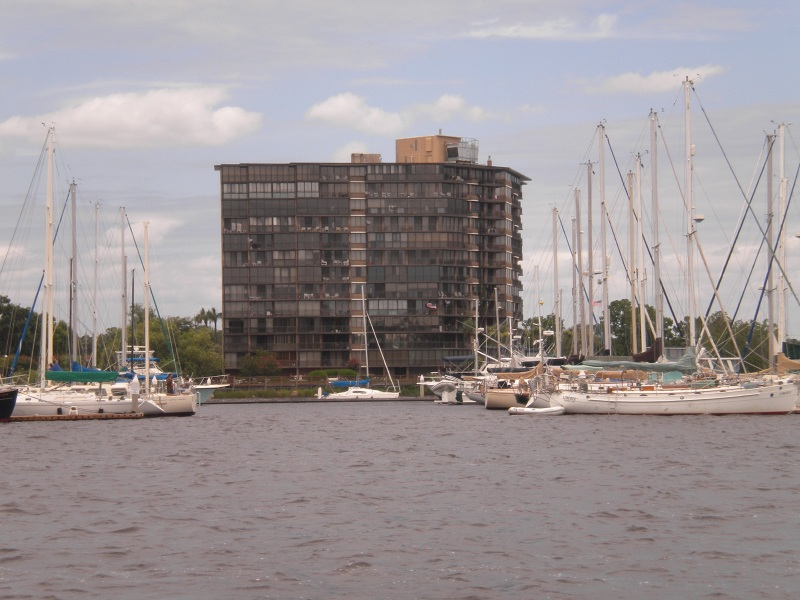
View of some condos along the Ortega River from Ortega during the winter.

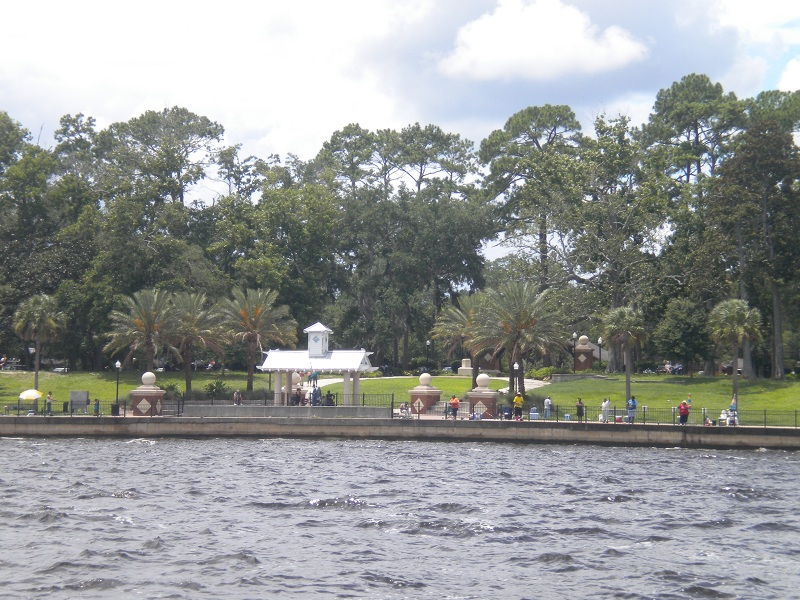
View of Stockton Park in Ortega from St. Johns River.

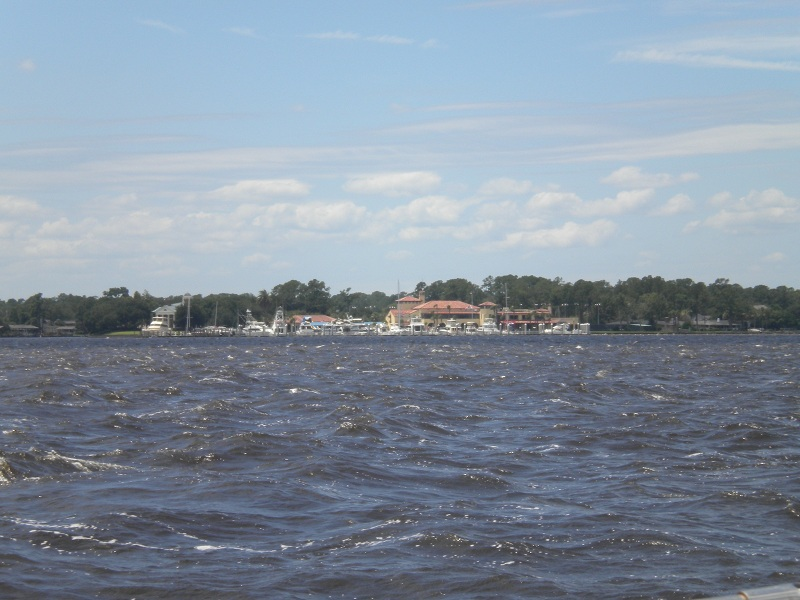
View of the Florida Yacht Club in the Ortega neighborhood on a day when the St. Johns River was choppy with windswept waves. The current clubhouse dates to 1928.
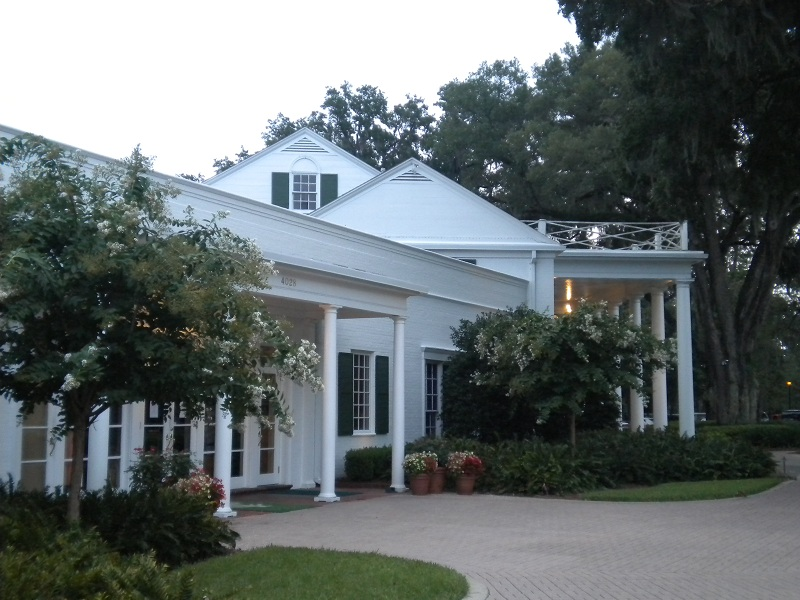
A side view of the Timuquana Country Club. The links were designed by Donald Ross.

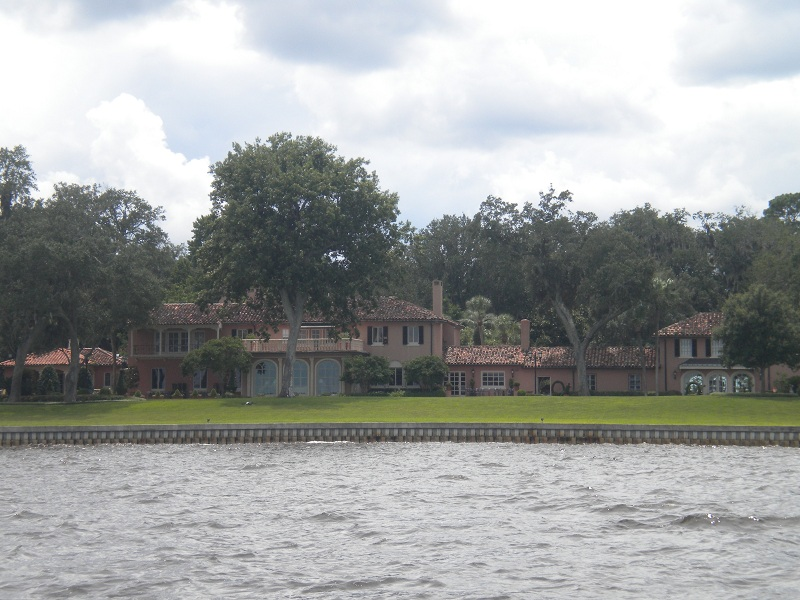
A view from the St. Johns River of the 1925 Mediterranean mansion Los Cedros designed by famed architect Marion Sims Wyeth of Palm Beach.

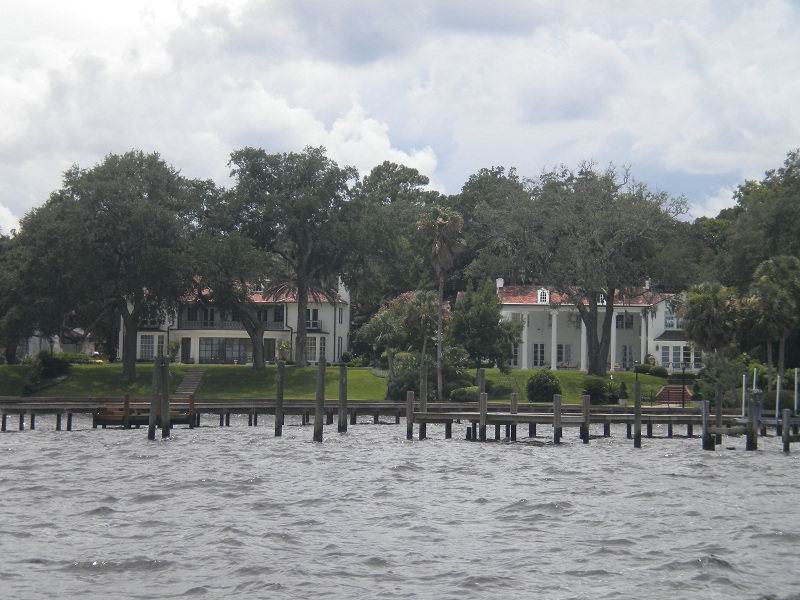
Old Ortega Riverfront mansions.

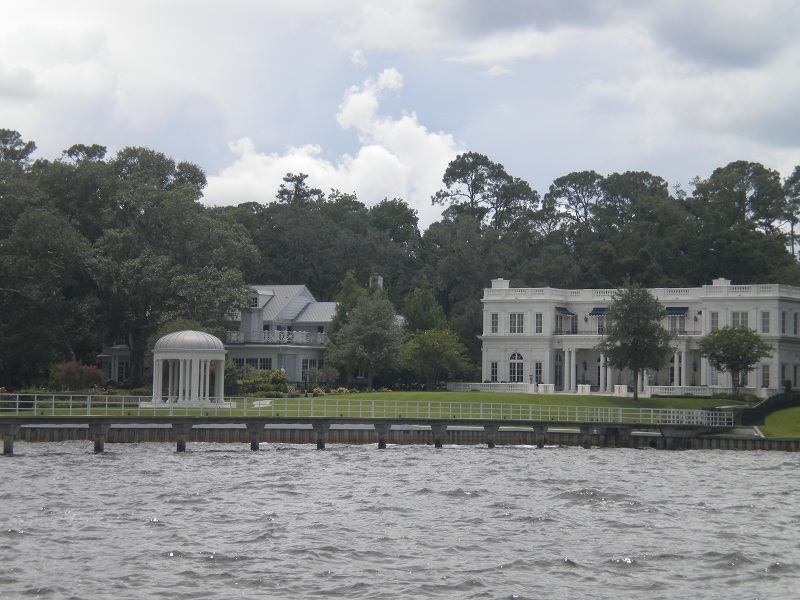
More Ortega riverfront mansions.

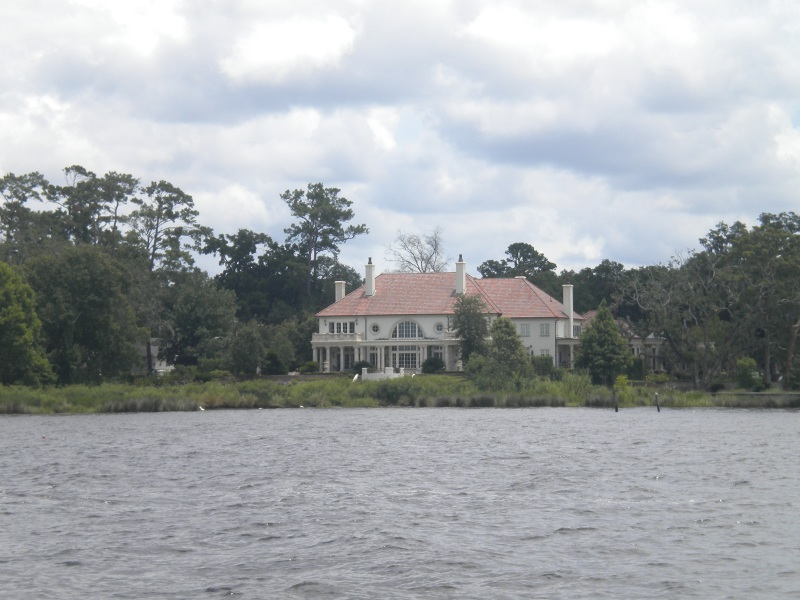
Another fairly new Ortega riverfront mansion.
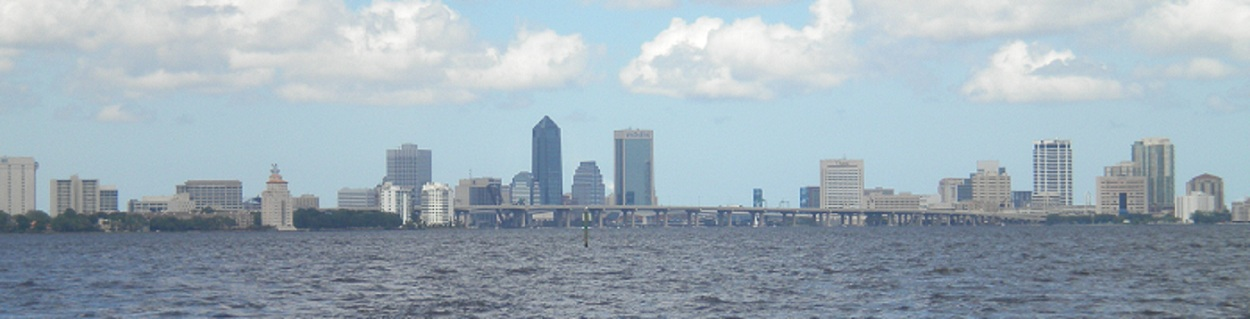
Panorama of Downtown Jacksonville taken from Ortega. This is the view that many residents of that neighborhood have.
