= Public School Number Four =

Coordinates: 30.319°N 81.680°W

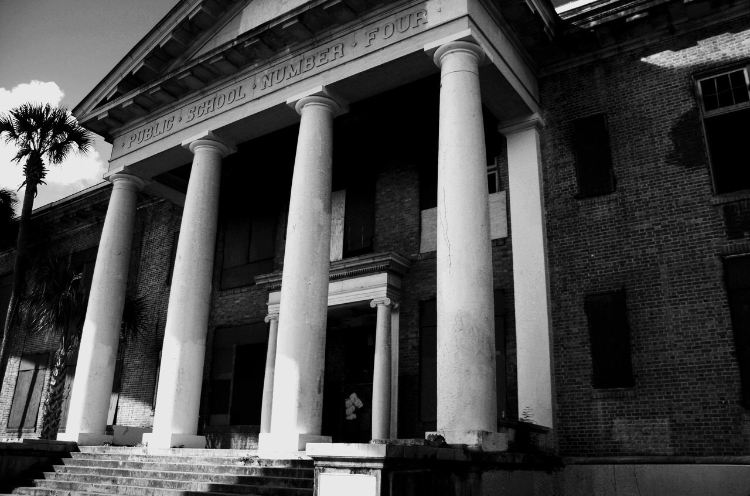
- Public School Number Four in 2012.
- Jacksonville, Florida; USA

Information
- Type: Public
- Established: 1918 (as Riverside Grammar School)
- Closed: 1960
- Nickname: "Devil's School"

Public School Number Four (later renamed Annie Lytle Elementary School) is an abandoned elementary school in Jacksonville, Florida. It was first established in 1918 as Riverside Grammar School and was Duval County's fourth public school house.

Public School Number Four was designated a historic landmark by the Jacksonville City Council in 2000. The abandoned school is also said to be haunted.

== History ==
Public School Number Four traces its origins to Riverside Park School built in 1891. The school was a boxy wooden-frame later deemed a fire hazard and unstable. In 1915 Duval County passed a $1 million bond to build new brick school houses including one to replace Riverside Park School. Construction on a new school began in 1917, designed by architect Rutledge Holmes, and was completed in 1918 as Riverside Grammar School. It was Duval County's fourth public school house and inscribed on the building is Public School Number Four to reflect this. The name changed to Annie Lytle Public School around 1950 after the principal of Riverside Park School Annie Lytle Housh. Most of the school was constructed with poured concrete and was designed to withstand anything. The school originally overlooked Riverside Park until the construction of Interstate 95 and Interstate 10 isolated the school. In 1960 Annie Lytle was permanently closed to the public and was used for office space and storage for ten years. The building was sold in 1980 for $168,000 to the Ida Stevens Foundation in hopes of renovating it for senior citizen apartments. Due to federal funding programs the building was not renovated.

The building has been vacant for more than 20 years falling into disrepair. A fire erupted at the vacant building in 1995 leading to the auditorium roof to cave in. In 1999 Foundation Holding Incorporated purchased the property to convert it into condominiums but public outcry resulted in the school becoming a designated historic landmark in 2000. Tarpon IV LLC purchased the building in 2011 for an $86,600 tax deed.

== Myths and legends ==
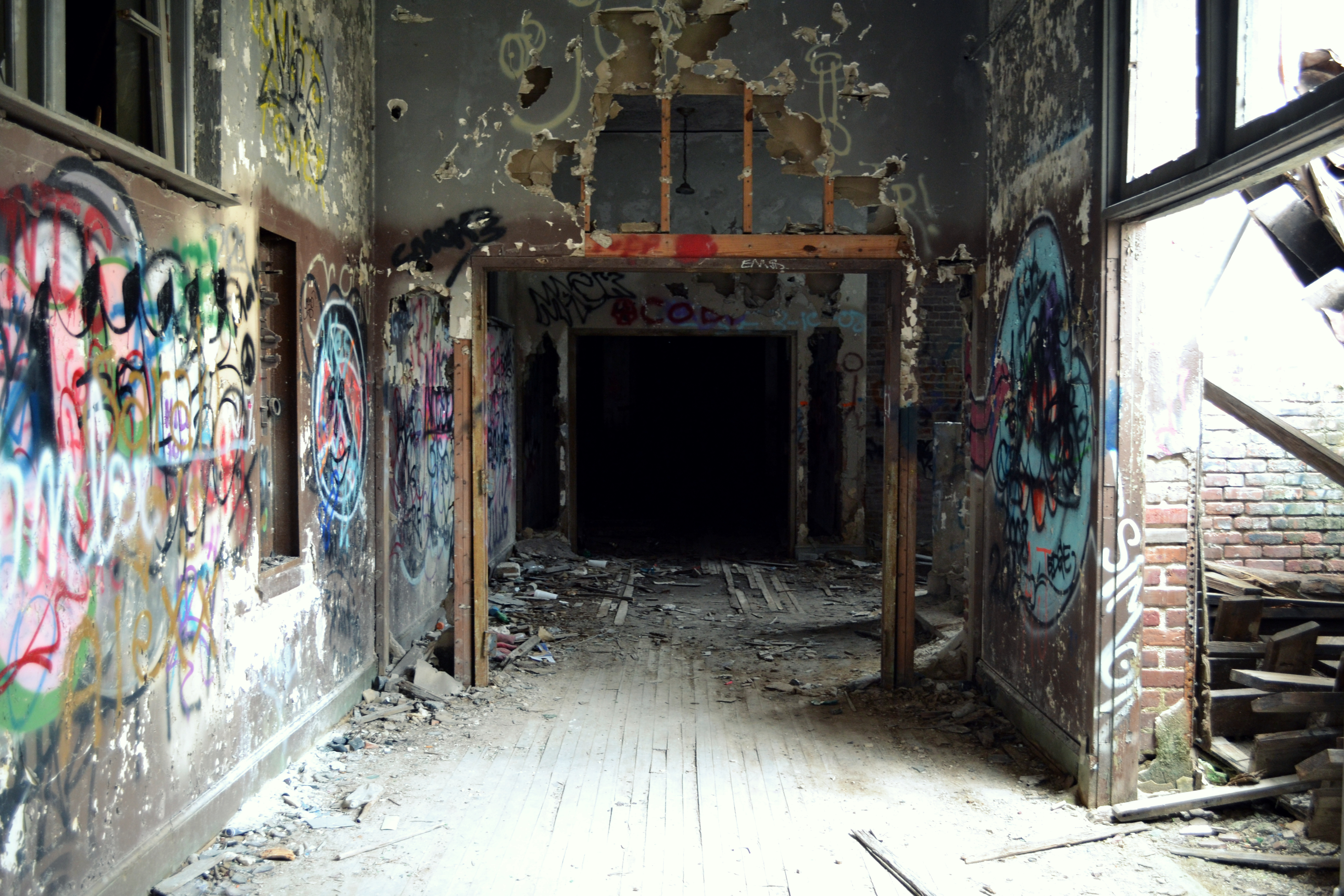
Building interior in 2013

The abandoned school has attracted numerous vandals, homeless, and drug addicts in addition to graffiti artists covering much of the interior. The vandalism and ruins of the school led to various local myths being developed such as a janitor who tortured students in the boiler room despite a lack of evidence. Because of the rumors, trespassers often visit the schoolhouse "in attempts to see a ghost or spirit that haunts the abandoned building" and has become a problem for The Annie Lytle Preservation Group, the property's sole protector dedicated to saving the building. The Group stated that, "The boiler never exploded and killed kids. The janitor never killed kids...It's all nonsense. It never happened." The group also warned the people in a Facebook post in 2019 that trespassers will be arrested if caught on the property and emphasized its close partnership with the Jacksonville Sheriff's Office. 10 people have been arrested.
