= Florida Yacht Club =

Private country and yacht club

Coordinates: 30.2524°N 81.6897°W

- Burgee
- Founded: 1876
- Location: Jacksonville, Florida, U.S.

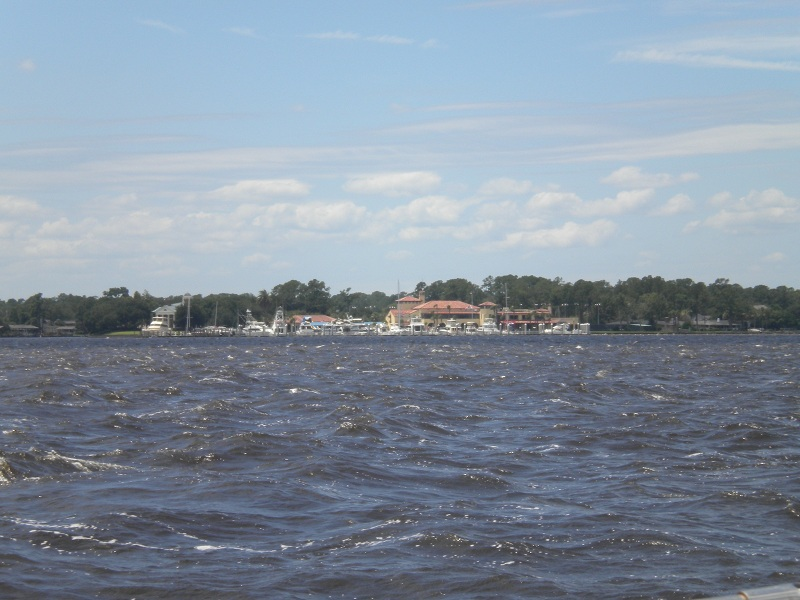
View of the Florida Yacht Club in the Ortega neighborhood of Jacksonville, FL.

The Florida Yacht Club is a private country and yacht club in Jacksonville, Florida, U.S. It is the oldest social club in Jacksonville, and is the fourth oldest surviving yacht club in the U.S. It was founded in downtown Jacksonville in 1876 , and moved to its present location in the Ortega neighborhood in 1928.

== History ==
Florida Yacht Club was established by seventeen charter members in 1876. New York businessman William Backhouse Astor, Jr., was the driving force behind the creation of a club promoting boating and water sports in Jacksonville. Astor felt that the broad and slow St. Johns River was a perfect location for boating, though he was the only person in Jacksonville to actually own a yacht at the time. The original clubhouse was constructed at the end of Market Street in downtown Jacksonville, and cost $3,500, to which Astor contributed $500. The original Florida Yacht Club building was a large two-story edifice, with the second floor being used for gatherings and dances. Astor served as the club's first "Commodore".

The original building burned down in the Great Fire of 1901. The club moved to a temporary clubhouse in the Riverside neighborhood, before relocating to a new dedicated facility on Willow Branch Creek in 1907. In 1928 the club moved to its present building in the Ortega neighborhood. The current clubhouse was designed in the Mediterranean Revival style and cost $90,000.
