= River City Pride =

Annual LGBT event in Jacksonville, Florida

- River City Pride logo

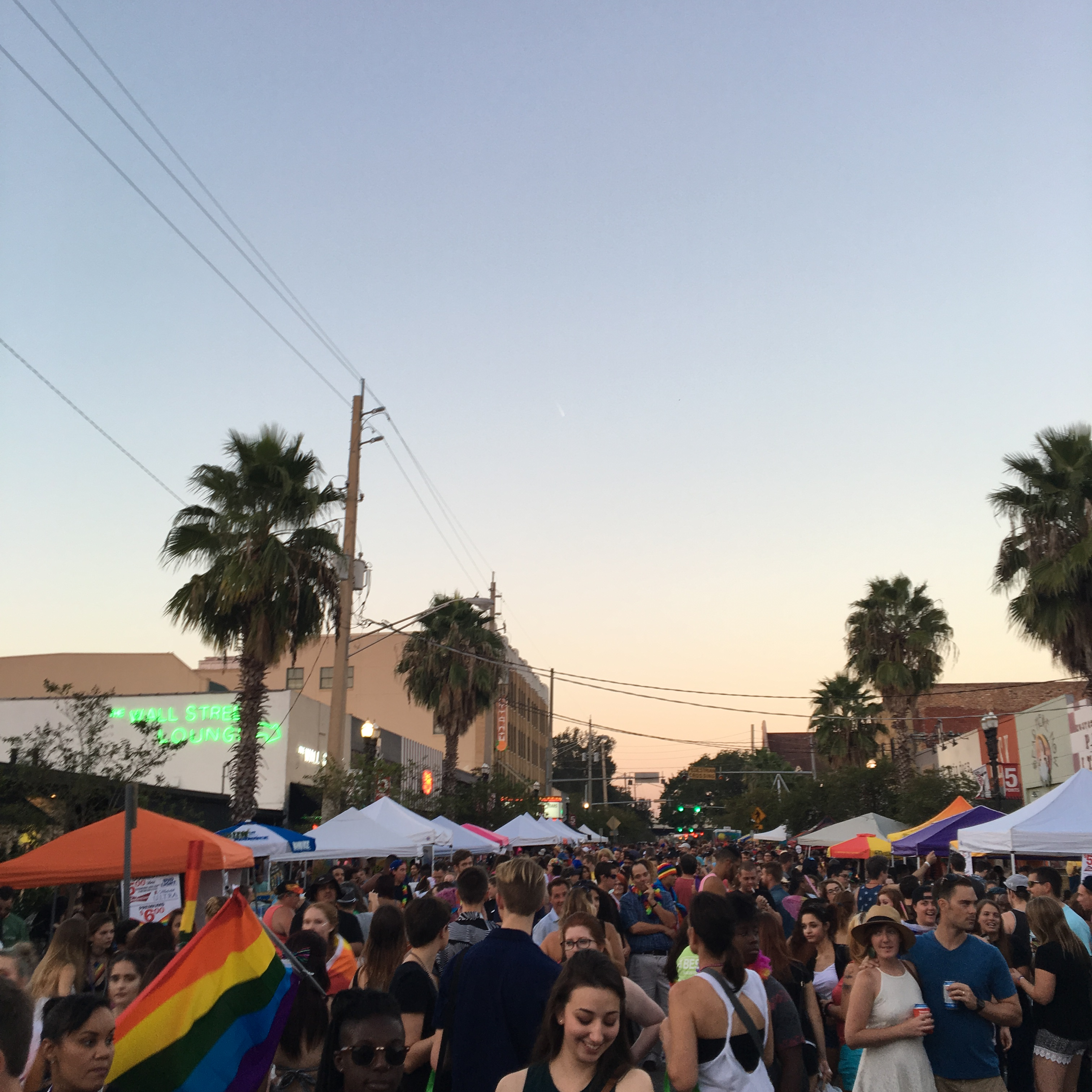
- 2016 Post-Parade Block Party in 5-Points
- Genre: LGBT pride parade and festival
- Begins: October
- Frequency: annual
- Locations: Five Points, Riverside; Jacksonville, Florida; United States
- Years active: 48
- Inaugurated: 1978
- Most recent: 2018 dates unconfirmed
- Attendance: 15,000 (2014 estimates)
- Organizer: River City Pride Committee
- Website: www.rivercitypride.org

River City Pride, also known as Jacksonville Pride, is an annual weekend-long pride parade and festival in Jacksonville, Florida. The event celebrates the local lesbian, gay, bisexual, and transgender (LGBTQ) community and their allies. Over the years the event has been held in multiple venues around the city. The current incarnation is centered in the Five Points area in the neighborhood of Riverside. An estimated 15,000 were in attendance during the 2014 celebrations.
