= Riverside Park (Jacksonville) =

Public park in Jacksonville, Florida

- Picture postcard of Riverside Park in the 1910s
- Interactive map of Riverside Park
- Type: Municipal (Parks & Recreation Department)
- Location: Jacksonville, Florida
- Coordinates: 30°19′2″N 81°40′50″W
- Area: 11.4 acres (46,000 m^{2})
- Created: 1890s
- Operator: City of Jacksonville
- Status: Open all year

Riverside Park is an 11.4-acre (46,000 m^{2}) public park, located in the heart of Riverside, one of the most historic neighborhoods near downtown Jacksonville, Florida. It is the second-oldest park in the city.

== History ==
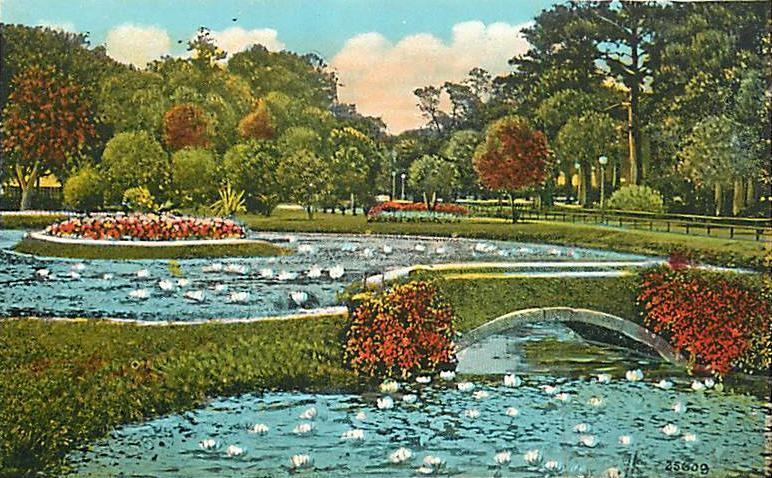
Water lilies and bridge between ponds

The area was identified as a 14-acre public park when the Riverside section was platted along the St. Johns River in 1869. The property contained two lakes that were spring-fed and home to numerous waterfowl. However, development did not begin until years later when the land was donated to the city. Some time after 1890, a carriage lane and walking paths were created, stone bridges were constructed, and ornamentals were planted, including camphor trees. By 1907, it was one of the prettiest parks in the southern U.S. with picture postcards capturing the beauty. Tennis courts and a bandstand were built, attracting even more people to the park's natural features. When Margaret Street was laid out, it cut off the southwest corner of the park, and the north side of the property was used by Interstate 95, reducing the parcel to its current 11.4 acres. A city-owned brick storage warehouse was constructed on the park property along College Street in 1940, which is no longer used.

A camellia garden was planted in 1967 by the Jacksonville Men's Garden Club. The Riverside Avondale Preservation (RAP) group, founded in the mid-1970s, made numerous park improvements over the years, and when high winds uprooted and toppled 52 trees in 1997, city employees and RAP volunteers worked together to restore the park. In 2012, many areas of the park were still barren of trees, but the park included a basketball court, playground equipment, picnic tables, benches and two lakes.

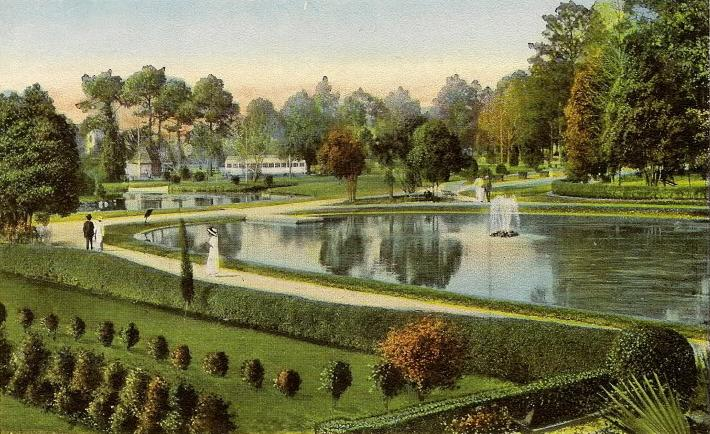
Manicured grounds and ponds in Riverside Park ca. 1913
