= Roy A. Benjamin =

American architect

Roy A. Benjamin (1887–1963) was a prominent architect who lived in Jacksonville, Florida.

Benjamin moved from Ocala to Jacksonville in 1902.

He designed several theaters in Jacksonville and the surrounding southeast region. His work included Jacksonville's Imperial Theatre (demolished), Palace Theatre (Jacksonville) (demolished), Riverside Theatre, San Marco Theatre, and Arcade Theater (Jacksonville). He assisted on the Florida Theatre (with R.E. Hall) and on Memorial Park (Jacksonville) (with the Olmsted Brothers). He worked with Mellen C. Greeley from 1919 to 1924. After World War II he retired and sold his practice to William D. Kemp, Franklin S. Bunch, and William K. Jackson, who have continued the firm as KBJ Architects.

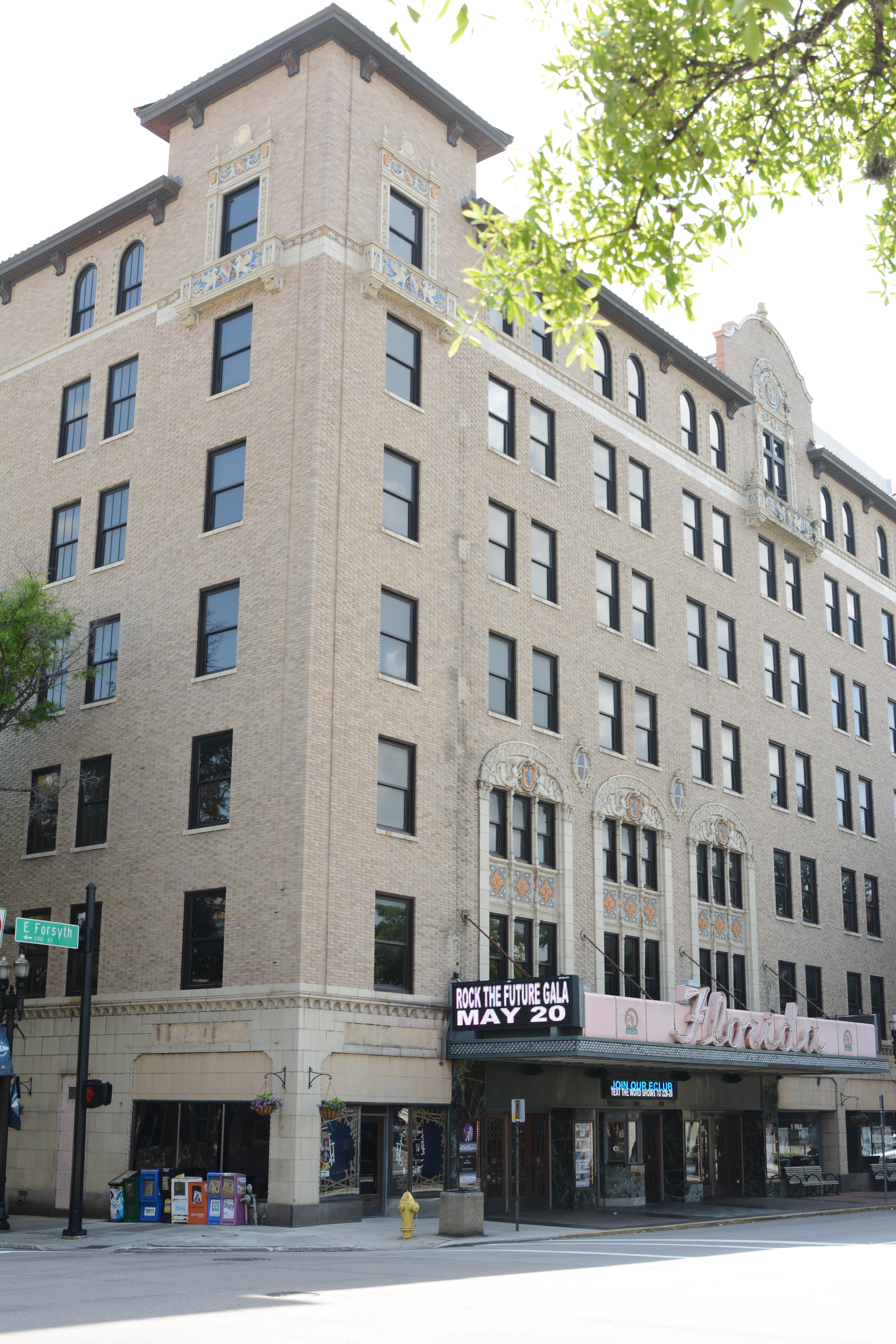
Florida Theatre

He also designed the PAL Theatre for owner Mr. Mitchell F. Brice in 1927 in downtown Vidalia, Georgia. The Pal Theatre in Vidalia was owned by Mr Brice and his heirs until 2004. It is currently owned by the City of Vidalia and is under renovation as of the summer of 2016.

Benjamin designed his own home at 2332 Riverside Avenue. It was constructed in 1921, but has since been demolished. He also designed the Sarasota Opera House.

Roy A. Benjamin also designed a theater in downtown Lake Worth, FL. The theater was built in the 1940s. In 2010 the building was donated by the Montgomery family to serve as a home for the Palm Beach Cultural Council. Admission is free and open to the public.

== Work (often in association with others) ==
- Jacksonville
  - Arcade Theare
  - Palace Theatre 32 E. Forsyth Street (demolished 1956)
  - Elks Club Building
  - Otis Elevator Building
  - Fire Station#4 (Jacksonville)
  - Leon Cheek Residence at 2263 River Boulevard
  - San Juline Apartments at 1617 - 1637 Riverside Avenue
  - Fenimore Apartments at 2200 Riverside Avenue
  - Hartimore Apartments at 2970 Riverside Avenue
  - Park Lane Apartments at 1846 Margaret Street
  - Lauderdale Apartments in Springfield
  - Avondale Apartments in Springfield
  - Florida State Board of Health Building For Vital Statistics And Administration in Springfield (built in 1937)
  - Scottish Rite Masonic Temple (Jacksonville)
  - The Elephant House at the Jacksonville Zoo (demolished)
- Sarasota Opera House
- Miller Theater, Augusta, Georgia
- Saenger Theater (Biloxi, Mississippi) (1928–29)

== See also ==
- Architecture of Jacksonville
