= Sarah Kambe Holland =

American filmmaker

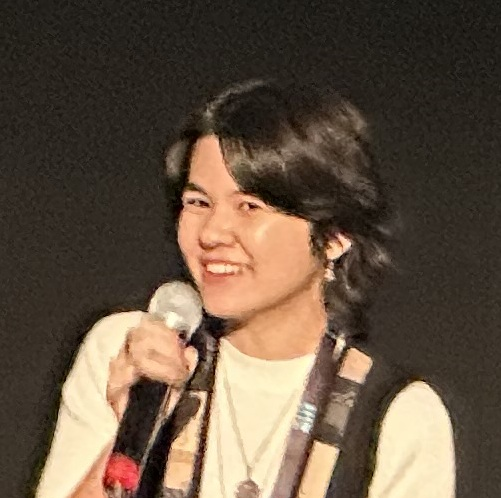
- Sarah Kambe Holland in 2023
- Occupations: Director; Screenwriter; Actress
- Notable work: Egghead & Twinkie (2023)

Sarah Kambe Holland (born 4 July 1997) is a queer Asian American film director, screenwriter, and actress. She received the Best Directing Award from the Women Making a Scene International Film Project in 2019. She wrote, produced, and directed Egghead & Twinkie (2023).

== Early life and education ==
Sarah Kambe Holland was raised in Fukuoka, Japan as well as Austin, Texas. She graduated with a BFA and then an MFA in Film at the University of Central Florida.

== Career ==
While studying at the University of Central Florida, Holland directed a number of short films, including In Bloom and Lady Bikers of Kolkata. In 2019, she introduced her short film Egghead & Twinkie, which won the grand prize at the 2020 Vibrant Media Productions Film Festival. This short film was then expanded into a feature of the same title. Holland obtained funding for Egghead & Twinkie (2023) on TikTok, the first feature film to successfully crowdfund on the platform.

== See also ==
- List of University of Central Florida alumni
