= Egghead & Twinkie =

2023 film by Sarah Kambe Holland

- Theatrical release poster
- Directed by: Sarah Kambe Holland
- Written by: Sarah Kambe Holland
- Produced by: Danielle Fountaine; Sarah Kambe Holland; Valerie Starks
- Starring: Louis Tomeo; Sabrina Jie-A-Fa
- Cinematography: Olivia Wilson
- Edited by: Anna DeFinis; Sarah Kambe Holland; Kristina League
- Music by: Ben Thornewill
- Production companies: CanBeDone Films; Orange Cat Films
- Release date: March 1, 2023
- Running time: 87 minutes
- Country: United States
- Language: English
- Budget: $100,000

Egghead & Twinkie is a 2023 film directed by Sarah Kambe Holland. The Seattle International Film Festival (SIFF) describes the film as a "coming-of-age LGBTQ+ comedy" about a recently out Asian American teen and her nerdy best friend who "set off on a 2,000-mile road trip to meet her online crush".

== Plot ==
Vivian Harris, an Asian American girl adopted by white parents, goes by the nickname "Twinkie" because "she is yellow on the outside and white on the inside." She is a closeted lesbian and an aspiring animator living in suburban Florida. Her best friend, Egghead, is a nerdy senior boy with plans to attend Stanford University in the fall. He lives across the street from Twinkie and has had feelings for her since early elementary school.

In the last few weeks of summer, Egghead tries to kiss Twinkie, finally acting on his long-hidden crush. Twinkie rebuffs Egghead and then comes out to him. Egghead reluctantly accepts this. When Twinkie tries to come out to her parents, however, her dad refuses to believe her and an argument ensues. She decides to run away for a few days to meet her online love interest, BD, a lesbian DJ living in Texas. Twinkie convinces Egghead to drive her there, claiming that she wants to visit an animation studio in Dallas.

While on the road trip, Egghead finds out about BD and feels jealous and betrayed. Harsh words are exchanged, and Twinkie drives off in the car, leaving Egghead stranded at a motel. After driving forty miles in the wrong direction, Twinkie's car breaks down on the side of the road. She seeks refuge in a Chinese restaurant where she meets Jess, an awkward bisexual waitress. While waiting for her car to be fixed, Twinkie and Jess get to know each other and bond over their shared experiences as queer Asian Americans. Saying goodbye to Jess, Twinkie drives back to the motel and reunites with Egghead. They stop at a diner where Twinkie apologizes for abandoning Egghead and explains everything he missed.

After a failed attempt at dining-and-dashing, Twinkie and Egghead finally reach the nightclub where BD is DJ-ing. Twinkie is unable to enter the venue, and BD breaks up with her over the phone without ever meeting face-to-face. That night, Twinkie opens up about her doubts and fears while she thinks Egghead is asleep. The next morning, Egghead encourages Twinkie to pursue a romance with Jess, showing that he has grown into an ally and wants the best for his friend. With Egghead's support, Twinkie stops by the Chinese restaurant to see Jess and realizes that there just might be a spark between them.

== Cast ==
- Sabrina Jie-A-Fa as Vivian "Twinkie" Harris
  - Janelle Pham as Young Twinkie
- Louis Tomeo as Egghead
  - Bryson JonSteele as Young Egghead
- Asahi Hirano as Jess
- Ayden Lee as B.D.
- J. Scott Browning as Scott Harris
- Kelley Mauro as Lisa Harris
- Roger Greco as Bob
- Steven Lane as Randy
- Ginger Lee McDermott as Waitress
- Julian Smith as Cashier

Cast adapted from The A.V. Club

== Production ==
=== Development ===
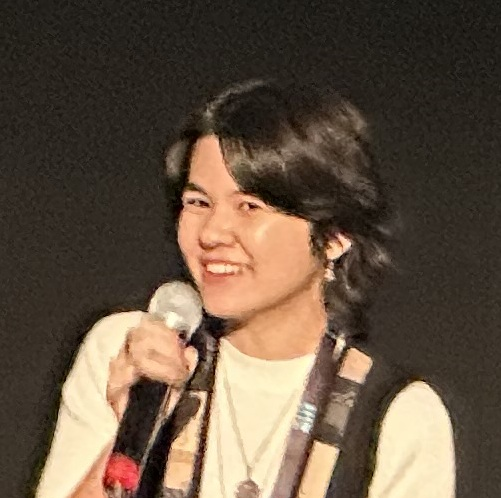
Sarah Kambe Holland at the Seattle International Film Festival in 2023

Egghead & Twinkie is the feature debut of Sarah Kambe Holland. She directed the film and also wrote the screenplay. She previously directed a few short films including In Bloom and Lady Bikers of Kolkata. In 2019, she introduced her proof-of-concept short film Egghead & Twinkie which was later expanded into this feature. It was crowdfunded on Indiegogo, raising $1K for production. It claims to be the first feature film to successfully crowdfund on TikTok.

Louis Tomeo and Sabrina Jie-A-Fa play the titular roles of Egghead and Twinkie. For both Tomeo and Jie-A-Fa, it was their first starring role in a feature film. They previously appeared as the same characters in Holland's proof-of-concept short film.

Holland collected $50K in grants through submitting her proof-of-concept short film to competitions and festivals. The remaining budget was then accrued through crowdfunding sites like Seed&Spark.

=== Filming ===
Principal photography took place over the course of 40 days. The shoot was originally scheduled for 2020 before being pushed back by one year due to the COVID-19 pandemic. The majority of the cast and crew were volunteers, requiring production to work around their schedules, and the film was split into 4 phases throughout 2020 and 2021. For any locations where they were unable to secure permits, those scenes were shot Guerrilla style.

== Reception ==
The film has a score of 95 percent on Rotten Tomatoes. Max Bennion of Slug Magazine called the film "a low-budget comedy that wears its heart and influences on its sleeve, and it's sure to resonate deeply with its target audience".

Egghead & Twinkie won the Audience Award for Best Narrative Feature Film at its East Coast premiere at the 2023 Florida Film Festival. It was the third runner-up for the Golden Space Needle Audience Award at its West Coast premiere at the 2023 Seattle International Film Festival. It also won the Comedy Vanguard Award for best comedy feature at the 2023 Austin Film Festival.
