= Florida Theatre =

Historic theater in Jacksonville, Florida, US

Coordinates: 30.32628°N 81.65563°W

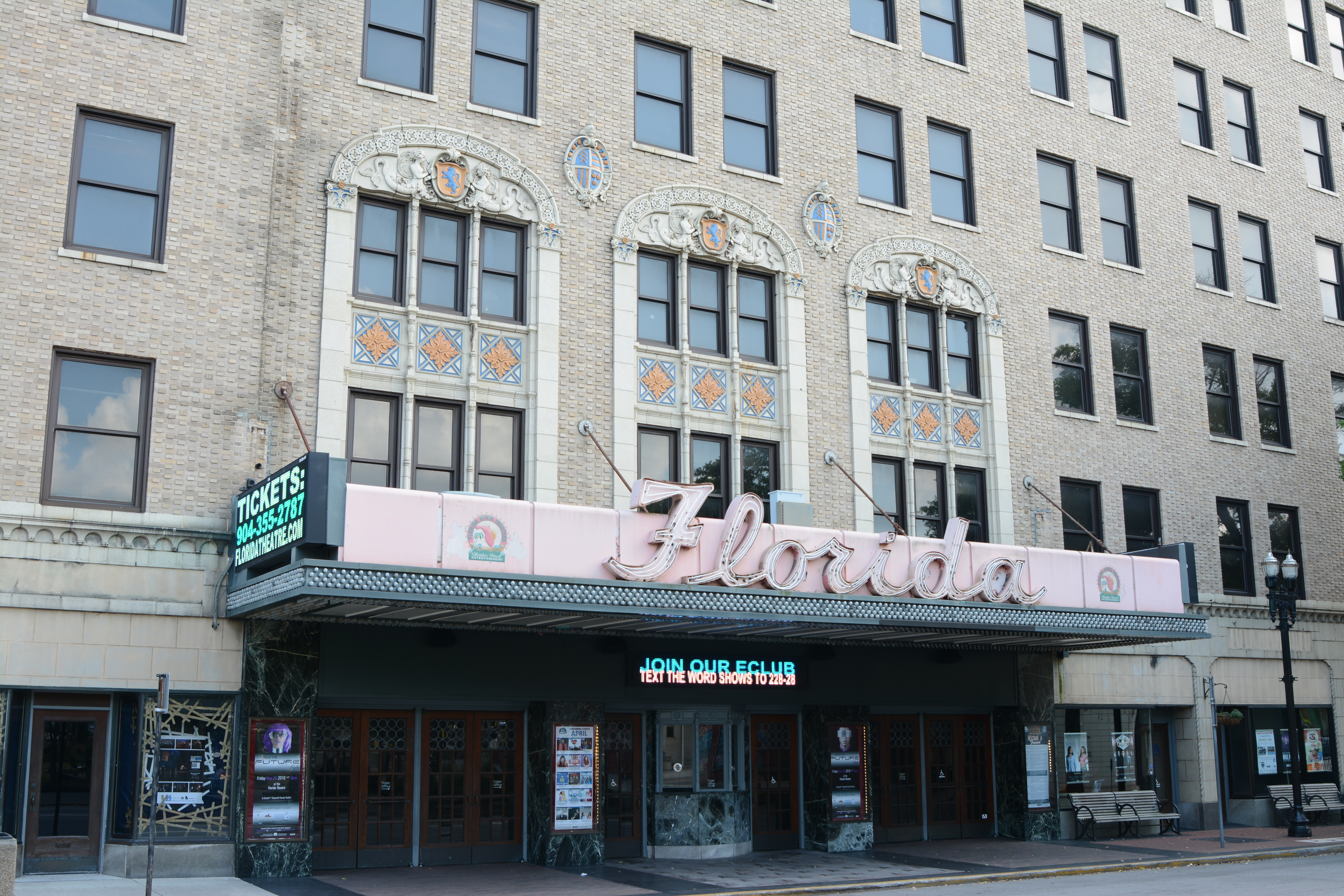
- Exterior view of the venue's marquee (2016)
- Interactive map of Florida Theatre
- Address: 128 E Forsyth St; Jacksonville, FL 32202-3366
- Location: Downtown Jacksonville
- Capacity: 1,900

Construction
- Opened: April 8, 1927
- Reopened: 1983
- Architects: R. E. Hall & Co.; Roy A. Benjamin

Website
- Venue Website
- Florida Theatre
- U.S. National Register of Historic Places
- Architectural style: Mediterranean Revival
- NRHP reference No.: 82001034
- Added to NRHP: November 4, 1982

The Florida Theatre is a historic performing arts venue in downtown Jacksonville, Florida, United States. Opened in 1927, it was added to the U.S. National Register of Historic Places in 1982. In 2012, the AIA's Florida Chapter placed the building on its list of Florida Architecture: 100 Years. 100 Places.

The theatre is one of only five remaining high-style palaces built in Florida during the Mediterranean Revival architectural boom of the 1920s, the other four being the Olympia Theater in Miami, the Saenger Theatre in Pensacola, the Polk Theatre in Lakeland, and the Tampa Theatre in Tampa.

== History ==
=== Golden Age of Hollywood: 1926–1960 ===
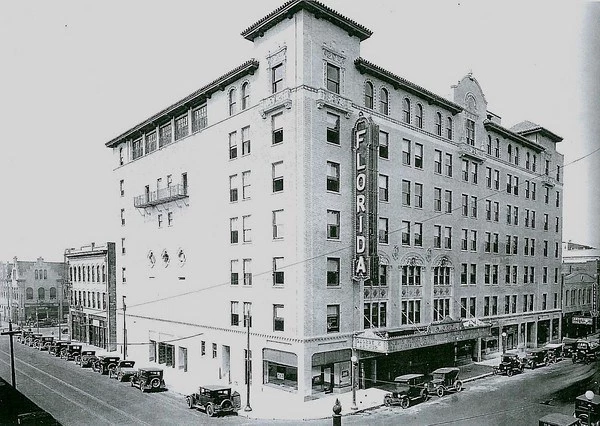
Florida Theatre in 1927.

Construction of the Florida Theatre started in the summer of 1926 by Southern Enterprises, Inc. with R. E. Hall & Co. and Roy A. Benjamin as the architects. The theatre was established as a seven-story concrete fireproof building with a roof garden and with an emphasis on showing movies and live performances. R. E. Hall and Roy A. Benjamin designed the Florida Theatre in the Mediterranean Revival architecture style. The site of the Florida Theatre was previously occupied by a police station and jail. Construction took only one year, and the theatre was opened to the public on April 8, 1927. At the time of the opening, the Florida Theatre was the largest theatre in Florida. Opening night included several programs: fanfare of the American Legion Bugle Corps, a live stage show, and the film Let It Rain. The Florida Theatre was open from 11:00 AM to 11:00 PM, showing a variety of films, news reels, or stage presentations. In 1938, the roof garden was closed and replaced with offices available for rent.

On August 10–11, 1956, Elvis Presley played two shows at the Florida Theatre, which caused some concern among Jacksonville city leaders. A committee was formed and Judge Marion Gooding prepared arrest warrants due to Presley's bodily movements and influence on the local youth. Gooding and Elvis had a private meeting where Gooding threatened to execute the warrants if Elvis disobeyed his orders. Elvis performed the show with no action from the police or Gooding.

=== Decline and renovations: 1960–present ===
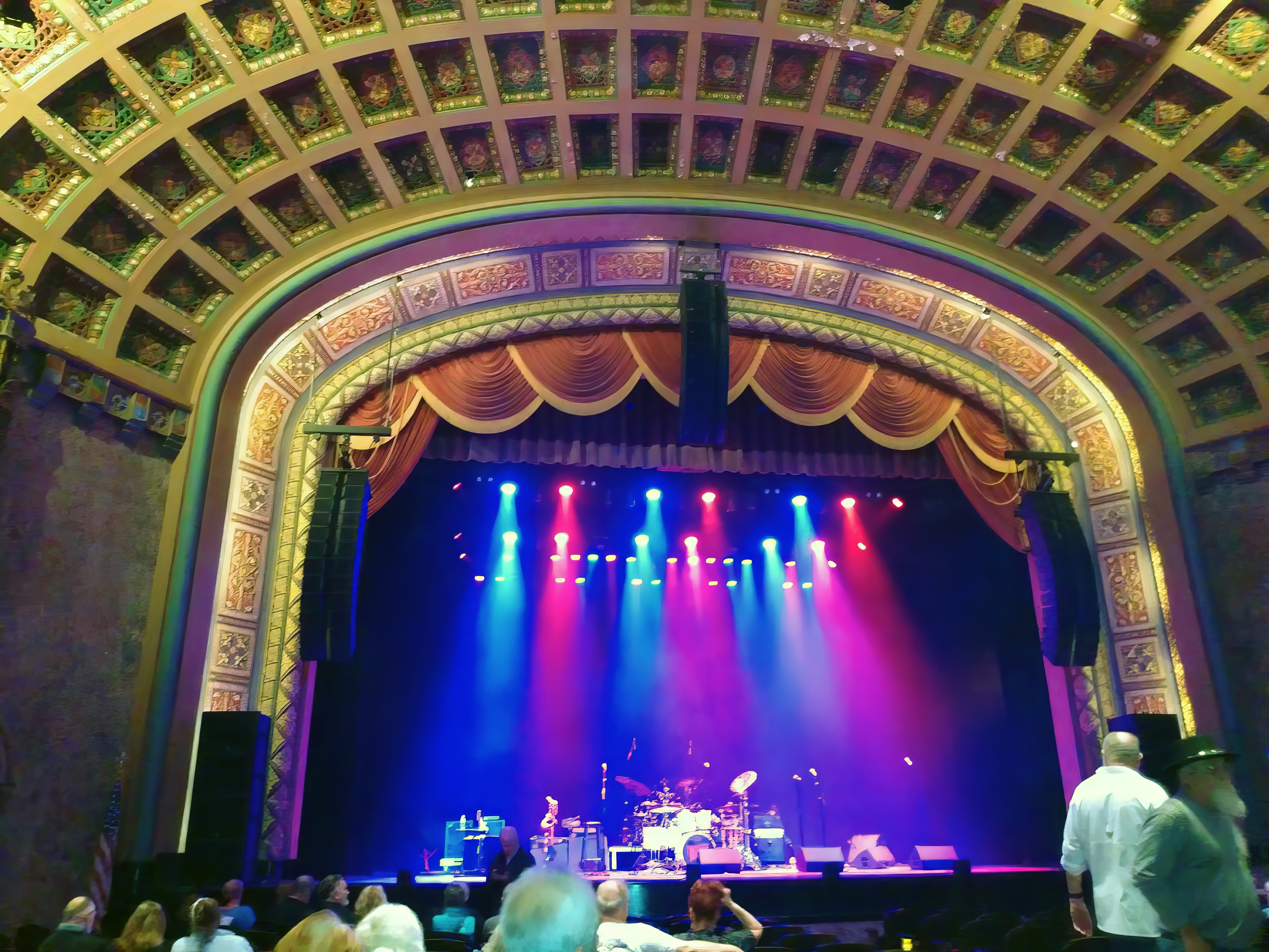
Inside the theatre in 2022

By the 1970s, the Florida Theatre was in decline and on May 8, 1980, it was forced to close. The historical significance of the Florida Theatre and its architecture led to a $500,000 grant from the State of Florida and a $350,000 grant from the City of Jacksonville HUD Community Development Block Grant with an additional $150,000 from fundraising. On October 31, 1981, the Florida Theatre was purchased by the Arts Assembly of Jacksonville for $1 million. The Arts Assembly immediately began restoring the dilapidated building with $5 million. The Florida Theatre was also at the time placed on the National Register of Historic Places on December 28, 1982. One year later, on August 26, 1983, the newly renovated Florida Theatre was reopened to the public. On October 1, 1987, the Florida Theatre separated from the Arts Assembly as an independent entity governed by its own board of directors. The Florida Theatre today is the permanent home of the Florida Ballet, Theatreworks, and the annual Community Nutcracker.
